= Tralkasaurus =

Tralkasaurus Temporal range: Early Cretaceous (Albian), 106.2 Ma

Scientific classification
- Kingdom: Animalia
- Phylum: Chordata
- Class: Reptilia
- Clade: Dinosauria
- Clade: Saurischia
- Clade: Theropoda
- Family: †Abelisauridae
- Genus: †Tralkasaurus; Cerroni et al., 2020

Type species
- †Tralkasaurus cuyi Cerroni et al., 2020

Extinct genus of dinosaurs

Tralkasaurus (meaning "thunder lizard") is a genus of abelisaurid dinosaur from the Huincul Formation from Río Negro Province in Argentina. The type and only species is Tralkasaurus cuyi, named in 2020 by Mauricio Cerroni and colleagues based on an incomplete skeleton. A medium-sized abelisaurid, Tralkasaurus exhibits a conflicting blend of characteristics found among the early-diverging abelisauroids with others that characterize the highly specialized clade Brachyrostra, and thus its position within the clade is poorly-resolved.

== Discovery and naming ==
The Violante Farm fossil site in Río Negro Province, Argentina, near the village of El Cuy, was discovered in 1999 by Sebastián Apesteguía on the north shore of the Ezequiel Ramos Mexía Reservoir. In a 2018 conference abstract, Matías Motta and colleagues reported new fossil discoveries, including a diverse fauna of dinosaurs, made at the Violante Farm site. The strata exposed are yellowish and greenish sandstones that are occasionally tuffaceous (i.e. bearing volcanic ash), which belong to the Albian Huincul Formation.

The specimens discovered included an incomplete skeleton of an abelisaurid, catalogued as MPCA-Pv 815, which comprises a maxilla; dorsal, sacral, and caudal vertebrae; cervical ribs; and a badly-preserved pubis. Motta and colleagues recognized that this abelisaurid, along with a coelurosaur and carcharodontosaurid, present distinct traits (autapomorphies) from other Huincul Formation theropods. The abelisaurid was formally named in 2020 by Mauricio Cerroni and colleagues as Tralkasaurus cuyi; the generic name is formed from "tralka", the Mapudungun word for "thunder", and the suffix -saurus, meaning lizard, while the specific name refers to the village of El Cuy.

== Description ==
Tralkasaurus was described by Cerroni and colleagues as a "medium-sized abelisaurid" based on the available material. Its maxilla has a length of 22 centimetres (8.7 in), smaller than that of the similarly "medium-sized" Skorpiovenator (at 32 centimetres (13 in), with the whole animal measuring 6 metres (20 ft) long). It is most comparable to the smallest-known abelisaurid, MMCh-PV 69, from the Candeleros Formation, with Tralkasaurus' pubis measuring 35 centimetres (14 in) long and MMCh-PV 69's pubis measuring 41 centimetres (16 in) long.

The maxilla of Tralkasaurus is a subtriangular bone covered in neurovascular foramina (pits formed by innervation) and rugosities (roughened areas). It encloses the antorbital fenestra from the front; Tralkasaurus is unique among abelisaurids in that front margin of the antorbital fenestra slopes forwards and upwards, instead of being vertical or sloping backwards. The antorbital fenestra creates fossae on both the upward-projecting process of the maxilla and (atypically among abelisaurids) the inner surface of the bone; this condition is more similar to basal abelisauroids like Noasaurus and Masiakasaurus, as well as the Averostra. Deep neurovascular grooves extend downward from the bottom rim of the antorbital fenestra, which is unlike Carnotaurus, Ekrixinatosaurus, Majungasaurus, and Skorpiovenator but similar to Rugops. More typically, the ascending process tapers and becomes laminar (sheet-like) at the top, like Skorpiovenator, Carnotaurus, and Majungasaurus. The maxilla also bears eleven sockets with four preserved teeth, which are typical of abelisaurids. Like Majungasaurus but unlike Skorpiovenator, the serrations on both edges of the teeth are the same size.

Based on comparisons with Carnotaurus and Majungasaurus, the dorsal vertebrae of Tralkasaurus originated from the mid-to-rear back. The transverse processes that extend out and upward are subtriangular like those of Dahalokely, Viavenator, Majungasaurus, and Masiakasaurus, but unlike the subrectangular processes of Carnotaurus. the parapophyses that project out and downward are distinctive among abelisaurids in their unusual narrowness and shortness; even in abelisaurids like Majungasaurus and MCF-PVPH-237, where the parapophyses are relatively narrow, they are not as rod-like as in Tralkasaurus. A ridge between them, the dorsal paradiapophyseal lamina, is also shallow and relatively low, unlike the strongly-developed ridges in Carnotaurus, Majungasaurus, and Ilokelesia. Another ridge, the posterior paradiapophyseal lamina, is robust and cross-cuts a fossa below the transverse process (the infradiapophyseal fossa), like Dahalokely.

The large transverse processes of the caudal vertebrae, which originated from the front of the tail, are typically abelisaurid, projecting strongly out and upward like Carnotaurus, Skorpiovenator, Aucasaurus, and Viavenator, but are more inclined than Majungasaurus. Processes projecting forwards and backwards at their tips would have been overlapping between caudal vertebrae; this is a distinguishing characteristic of the Brachyrostra. Meanwhile, although the pubis is poorly preserved, the pubic apron at its tip appears to have been expanded, like Rahiolisaurus but unlike Masiakasaurus or Carnotaurus.

== Classification ==
Cerroni and colleagues conducted a phylogenetic analysis to determine the affinities of Tralkasaurus. They found that it possesses synapomorphies of the Abelisauridae: a maxilla with a deep body, low ascending process, and reduced maxillary fossa, covered by foramina and rugosities; fused interdental plates lining the inside of the maxillary tooth row bearing strong vertical ridges; the subdivision of the infradiapophyseal fossae by the posterior paradiapophyseal laminae; a connection between the transverse processes and parapophyses by the dorsal paradiapophyseal laminae; large transverse processes strongly inclined upwards on the caudal vertebrae; and a thin pubic shaft. They also identified the forward-inclined front margin of the antorbital fenestra and its excavation of the body of the maxilla, the rod-like parapophyses, and the low paradiapophyseal laminae as autapomorphies of Tralkasaurus.

Within the Abelisauridae, the position of Tralkasaurus was more poorly resolved. In particular, it exhibits a conflicting blend of characteristics: the projections on the caudal transverse processes are typical of the Brachyrostra, but the presence of extensive antorbital fossae on the maxilla is plesiomorphic (i.e. characteristic of basal abelisauroids, and unlike other abelisaurids). The phylogenetic analysis accordingly placed Tralkasaurus among basal abelisaurids, but was unable to resolve its affinities beyond a polytomy (collapsed tree). The resulting phylogenetic tree is partially reproduced below.

- Abelisauridae
  - Rugops
  - - Tralkasaurus
    - Ilokelesia
    - Rahiolisaurus
    - Arcovenator
    - Xenotarsosaurus
    - Dahalokely
    - Majungasaurinae
      - Rajasaurus
      - Indosaurus
      - Majungasaurus
    - Brachyrostra
      - - Skorpiovenator
        - Ekrixinatosaurus
      - - Viavenator
        - - Quilmesaurus
          - Pycnonemosaurus
          - - Carnotaurus
            - - Aucasaurus
              - Abelisaurus

== Palaeoecology ==
Size of several dinosaurs from the Huincul Formation compared to a human

Numerous theropods are known from the Violante Farm fossil site of the Huincul Formation, including Gualicho and Aoniraptor (which may or may not represent the same megaraptoran), the carcharodontosaurid Taurovenator, a coelurosaur (identified by Cerroni and colleagues as an unenlagiine) and another carcharodontosaurid that remain unnamed, but are likely distinct species, and another indeterminate megaraptoran. Other dinosaurs also include a titanosaurian sauropod and an ornithopod. Additional vertebrates from the Violante Farm site include the eilenodontid rhynchocephalian Patagosphenos; a crocodyliform, possibly belonging to the Neosuchia; a squamate; a chelid turtle; and a fish referred to Lepidotes.

Dinosaurs named from other localities in the Huincul Formation include titanosaurs (Argentinosaurus, Choconsaurus, and Chucarosaurus), rebbachisaurids (Cathartesaura and Limaysaurus), carcharodontosaurids (Mapusaurus and Meraxes), abelisaurids (Skorpiovenator and Ilokelesia), an elaphrosaurine (Huinculsaurus), and a paravian (Overoraptor).

== See also ==
- Timeline of ceratosaur research
