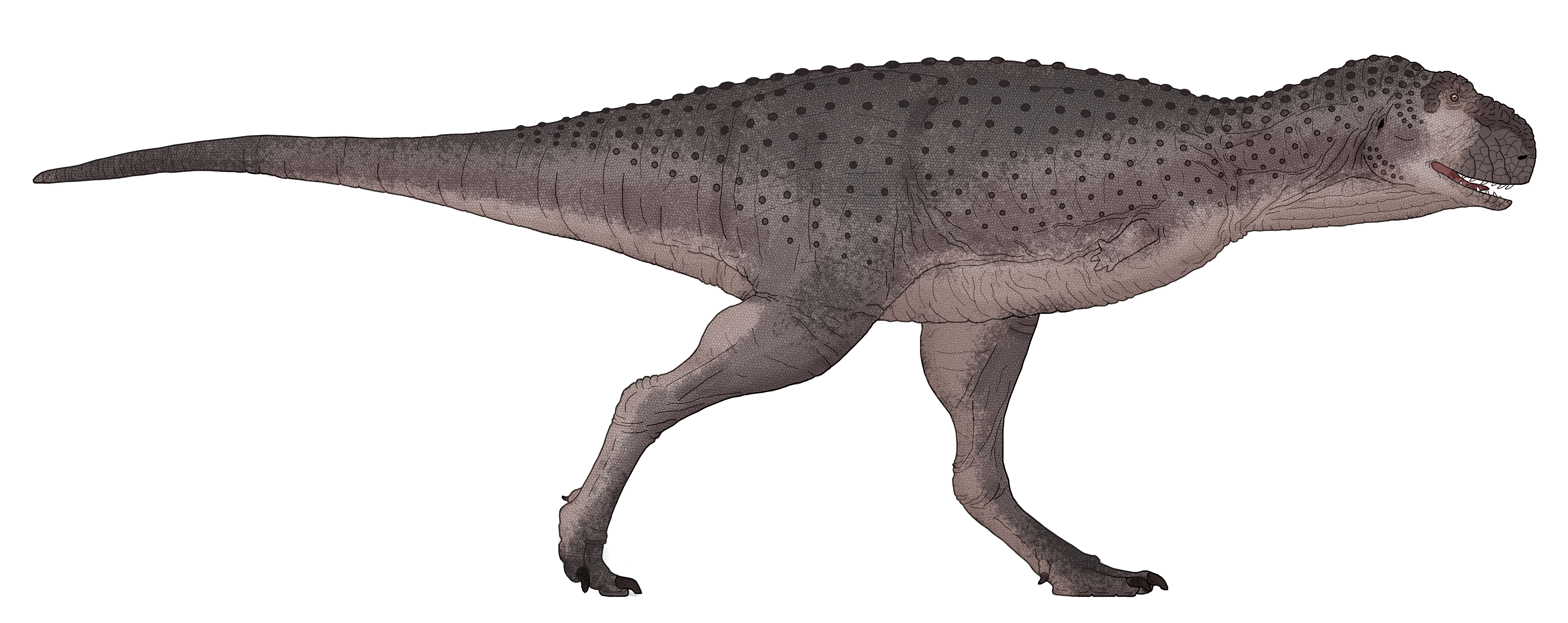
- Artist's impression of Thanos simonattoi

Scientific classification
- Kingdom: Animalia
- Phylum: Chordata
- Class: Reptilia
- Clade: Dinosauria
- Clade: Saurischia
- Clade: Theropoda
- Family: †Abelisauridae
- Clade: †Brachyrostra
- Genus: †Thanos; Delcourt and Iori, 2020
- Species: †T. simonattoi

Binomial name
- †Thanos simonattoi Delcourt and Iori, 2020

= Thanos simonattoi =

Thanos Temporal range: Late Cretaceous (Santonian)

Extinct species of dinosaur

Thanos (named for the Marvel Comics character) is a genus of carnivorous brachyrostran abelisaurid dinosaur that lived in Brazil during the Santonian stage of the late Cretaceous Period. It contains only a single species known as T. simonattoi.

== Discovery and naming ==
In 2014, the scientific literature reported that Sérgio Luis Simonatto with a team of the Museu de Paleontologia "Prof. Antonio Celso de Arruda Campos" had found the front of a theropod axis near São José do Rio Preto. Several years later, Fabiano and Vidoi Iori uncovered the rear part of the same vertebra.

In 2018, the type species Thanos simonattoi was named and described by Rafael Delcourt and Fabiano Vidoi Iori in an advance online publication in the journal Historical Biology. The paper was later published in print in 2020, making it the official year of description. The generic name refers to the Marvel Comics character Thanos, invented by Jim Starlin; Thanos was the main antagonist of Avengers: Infinity War, a high-grossing film released in 2018. The character's name is itself derived from the Greek θάνατος, thanatos, "death". The specific name honours Simonatto.

The holotype specimen, MPMA 08–0016/95, was found in the São José do Rio Preto Formation, part of the Bauru Group and dating from the Santonian. It consists of an almost complete axis fused with an axial intercentrum. It is missing several processes at the front, rear, and sides. The specimen is currently housed at the Museu de Paleontologia de Monte Alto, Brazil.

== Description ==
Size of Thanos compared to a human

The length of Thanos was originally estimated at 5.5–6.5 m (18.0–21.3 ft). A later study in 2025 estimated a body length of 4.3 m (14.1 ft) for this genus.

Despite the incompleteness of the material, several diagnostic features are present; a well-developed keel becomes wider and deeper posteriorly on the ventral surface; two lateral small foramina are separated by a relatively wide wall on each lateral surface of the centrum; and well-developed and deep prezygapophyseal spinodiapophyseal fossae are present. In view of these features, Thanos may have been more derived than other abelisaurids of that time.

== Phylogeny ==
In their phylogenetic analysis, Delcourt and Iori (2020) recovered Thanos in a large polytomy with other brachyrostrans within the Abelisauridae. Their resulting cladogram is:

- Abelisauridae
  - - Chenanisaurus
    - Pourcieux taxon
  - - "Kryptops"
    - - Rugops
      - - Majungasaurinae
          - - Rajasaurus
            - Indosaurus
            - Majungasaurus
          - - Genusaurus
            - - Arcovenator
              - La Boucharde Taxon
        - Brachyrostra
          - Thanos
          - Viavenator
          - Carnotaurus
          - Aucasaurus
          - Abelisaurus
          - Quilmesaurus
          - Pycnonemosaurus
          - Skorpiovenator
          - Ekrixinatosaurus
          - Ilokelesia
          - Xenotarsosaurus
          - - Rahiolisaurus
            - Dahalokely

Thanos shared only two synapomorphies with the Brachyrostra. The front articular facet of the axis is more than twice as high as the rear articular facet. The rear facet is inclined to the front under an angle of less than 75°.

== Paleoecology ==
Thanos shared its environment with an undescribed larger theropod believed to be a megaraptoran of which a vertebra, specimen MPMA 08–0003/94, has been found at Ibirá. This would imply that Thanos was not the apex predator of its habitat. It also coexisted with a dwarf saltasaurine sauropod Ibirania and an indeterminate notosuchian.

== See also ==
- Timeline of ceratosaur research
