= Llukalkan =

Llukalkan Temporal range: Santonian, 86–83 Ma

Scientific classification
- Kingdom: Animalia
- Phylum: Chordata
- Class: Reptilia
- Clade: Dinosauria
- Clade: Saurischia
- Clade: Theropoda
- Family: †Abelisauridae
- Clade: †Furileusauria
- Genus: †Llukalkan; Gianechini et al., 2021

Type species
- †Llukalkan aliocranianus Gianechini et al., 2021

Genus of abelisaurid dinosaur from the Late Cretaceous period

Llukalkan (Mapuche for "one who causes fear") is a genus of abelisaurid theropod dinosaur from the Late Cretaceous Bajo de la Carpa Formation of Argentina. The type species is Llukalkan aliocranianus.

== Discovery and naming ==
The holotype of Llukalkan, MAU-Pv-LI-581, consisting of a partial skull, was discovered during 2015 in the La Invernada site in Neuquén Province, Argentina, in the rocks of the Bajo de la Carpa Formation. It was discovered only 700 metres (2,300 ft) away from the remains of the contemporary abelisaurid Viavenator. It was described as belonging to the new taxon Llukalkan aliocranianus in 2021; the generic name is Mapuche for "one who scares" or "one who causes fear", and the specific name is Latin for "different skull".

== Description ==
Llukalkan is a small abelisaurid with an estimated body length of 3.95 metres (13.0 ft). Llukalkan is very similar to Viavenator, except that it is smaller and the holes in the skull through which the veins pass are larger and more widely separated from the supraoccipital crest, among other differences. It also has a small posterior air-filled sinus in the middle ear zone, a recessus tympanicus caudalis, that has not been found in any other abelisaurids and thus is an autapomorphy.

== Paleobiology ==
On account of its unusual ear, it has been theorized than Llukalkan had a keener sense of hearing than other abelisaurids, almost like a crocodile's.

== Classification ==
Gianechini et al. place Llukalkan as a derived abelisaurid, in the clade Furileusauria. Their cladogram is shown below.

- Abelisauridae
  - Kryptops
  - - Rugops
    - - Majungasaurinae
      - Brachyrostra
        - Xenotarsosaurus
        - - - Dahalokely
            - Rahiolisaurus
          - - - Ilokelesia
              - - Ekrixinatosaurus
                - Skorpiovenator
            - Furileusauria
              - Pycnonemosaurus
              - Quilmesaurus
              - Viavenator
              - Llukalkan
              - - Carnotaurus
                - Abelisaurinae
                  - Aucasaurus
                  - Abelisaurus
