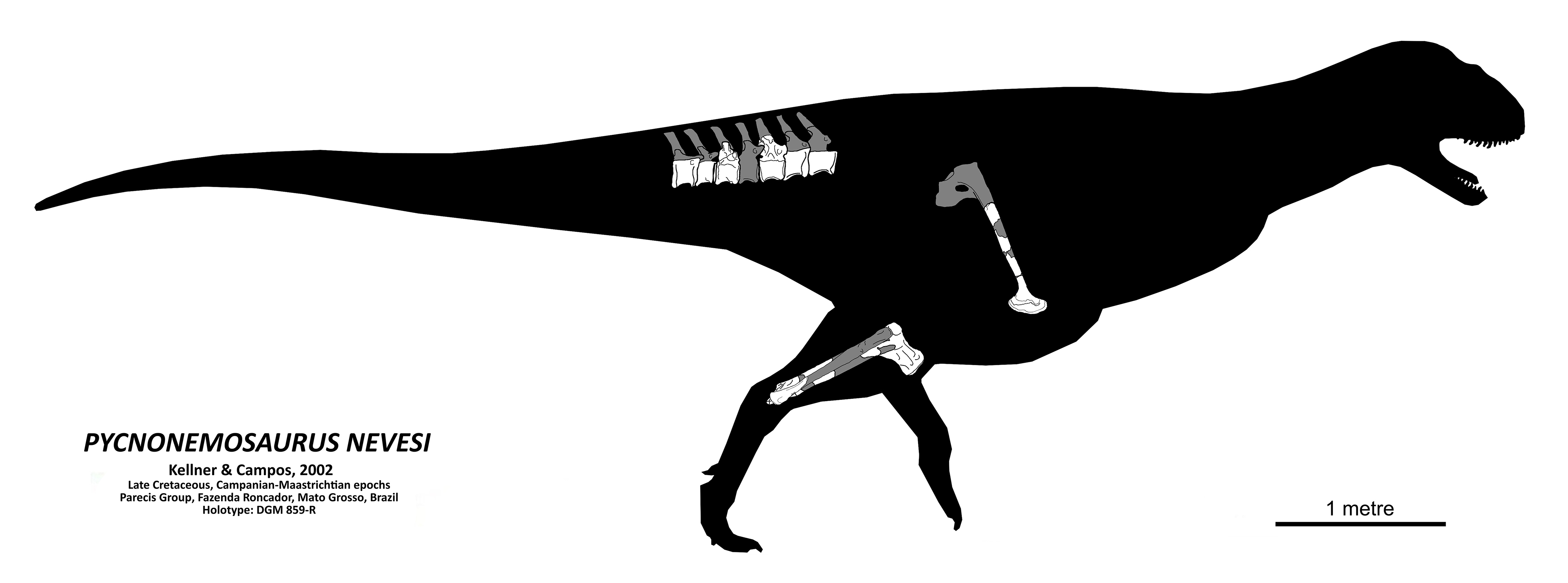
- Skeletal restoration showing known material

Scientific classification
- Kingdom: Animalia
- Phylum: Chordata
- Class: Reptilia
- Clade: Dinosauria
- Clade: Saurischia
- Clade: Theropoda
- Family: †Abelisauridae
- Clade: †Furileusauria
- Genus: †Pycnonemosaurus; Kellner & Campos, 2002
- Species: †P. nevesi

Binomial name
- †Pycnonemosaurus nevesi Kellner & Campos, 2002

Synonyms
- Pycnoneosaurus nevesi Paul, 2010 lapsus calami

= Pycnonemosaurus =

Pycnonemosaurus Temporal range: Late Cretaceous ~72 Ma

Extinct genus of dinosaurs

Pycnonemosaurus (meaning 'dense forest lizard') is a genus of carnivorous theropod dinosaur that belonged to the family Abelisauridae. It was found in the Upper Cretaceous red conglomerate sandstones of the Cachoeira do Bom Jardim Formation, Mato Grosso, Brazil, and it lived during the late Campanian to early Maastrichtian stage of the Late Cretaceous.

== Discovery and naming ==
The type species, Pycnonemosaurus nevesi, was scientifically described by Kellner and Campos in 2002. The only known specimen (DGM 859-R) was found in a red conglomeratic sandstone at the Jangada Roncador locality (then known as Fazenda Roncador), in Mato Grosso State that is exposed close to Paulo Creek, which is currently referred to the Cachoeira do Bom Jardim Formation. During 1952-1953, Llewellyn Ivor Price visited a farm named "Roncador" in the state of Mato Grosso and collected several dinosaur bones. These remains were found by the owner of the farm, Max de Barros Erhart, and his hired workers at the Paulo Creek site. The most important specimen found was the incomplete skeleton of a large abelisaurid theropod, which was found near several titanosaurid sauropod bones.

Pycnonemosaurus nevesi was named from the Greek word pycnós meaning dense, némos meaning pastures and woods, and saûrus meaning reptile or lizard. This naming was an allusion to Mato Grosso State, where the remains were found. The specific name was named after the late Dr. Iedo Batista Neves, who passed in 2000, who encouraged the pursuit of paleontological studies, particularly of Alexander Kellner.

== Description ==
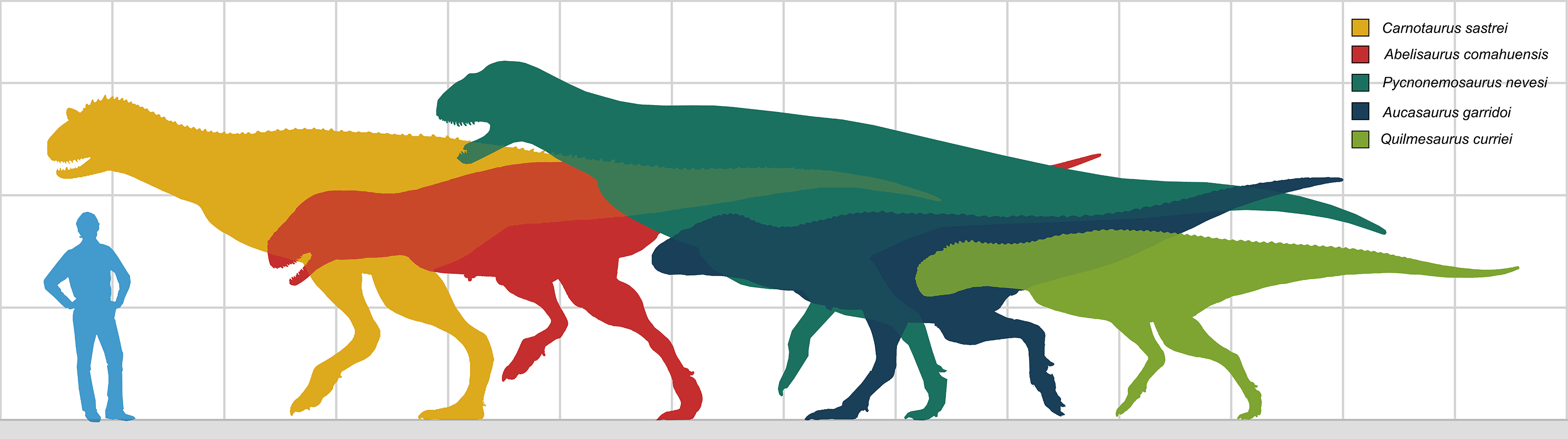
Size comparison of Pycnonemosaurus (dark green) with other related carnotaurins

Thus far, the remains of Pycnonemosaurus have been fragmentary. No elements were well preserved, and the bone surface is well abraded that indicates the elements were partially exposed at the discovery location before being collected. The type specimen, housed at the Earth Sciences Museum, Rio de Janeiro, consists of five incomplete teeth, parts of seven caudal vertebrae, the distal part of a right pubis, a right tibia, and the distal articulation of the right fibula. The small pubic foot and hatchet-shaped cnemial crest of the tibia distinguishes this species within the abelisaurs. The caudal vertebra has distinct abelisaurid features, such as a fan-shaped transverse process and a cranial projection. However, these awl-like projections are somewhat unlike related abelisaurids, such as Aucasaurus, in that they diminish more towards the distal caudals. All remains were found associated and are presently regarded as belonging to the same individual.

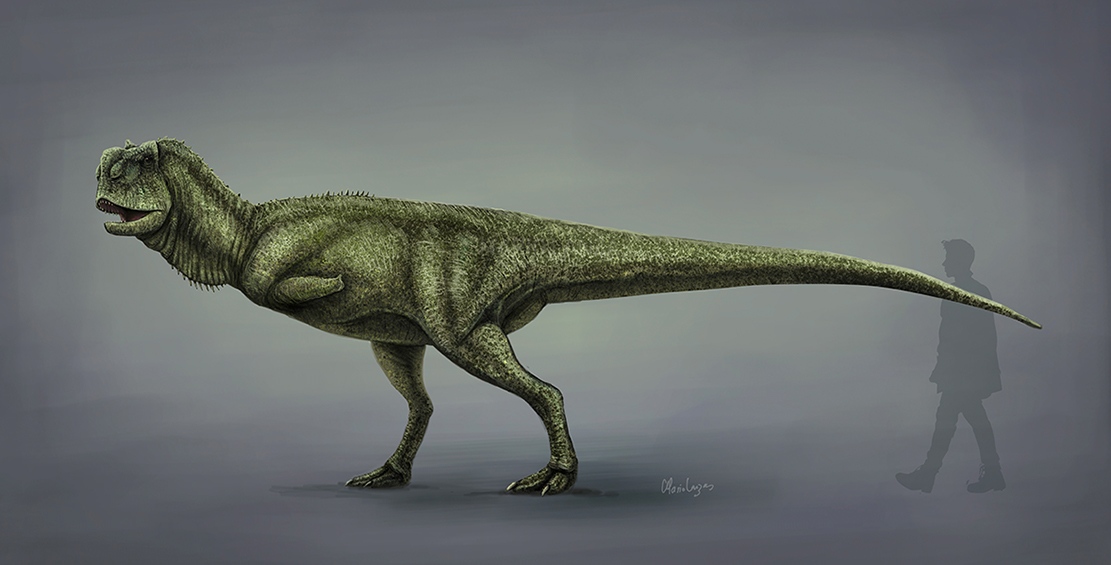
Life restoration

The type specimen of Pycnonemosaurus belongs to an immature individual of uncertain ontogenetic stage, probably a subadult. Initial size estimates of this specimen put the animal at 6–7 metres (20–23 ft) in length and 1.2 tonnes (1.3 short tons) in weight, but later analyses have found that it was likely larger, being about 8.9 metres (29.2 ft) long. This new size estimate currently makes Pycnonemosaurus the largest formally described member of the Abelisauridae thus far. Another estimation gave a length of 9 metres (29.5 ft) and a weight of 3.6 tonnes (4.0 short tons).

== Classification ==
The following cladogram follows an analysis of 2021 during the description of Llukalkan.

- Abelisauridae
  - Kryptops
  - - Rugops
    - - Majungasaurinae
        - - Genusaurus
          - Arcovenator
        - - Rajasaurus
          - Indosaurus
          - Majungasaurus
      - Brachyrostra
        - Xenotarsosaurus
        - - - Dahalokely
            - Rahiolisaurus
          - - - Ilokelesia
              - - Ekrixinatosaurus
                - Skorpiovenator
            - Furileusauria
              - Llukalkan
              - Pycnonemosaurus
              - Quilmesaurus
              - Viavenator
              - Carnotaurini
                - Carnotaurus
                - Abelisaurinae
                  - Aucasaurus
                  - Abelisaurus

== Paleoecology ==
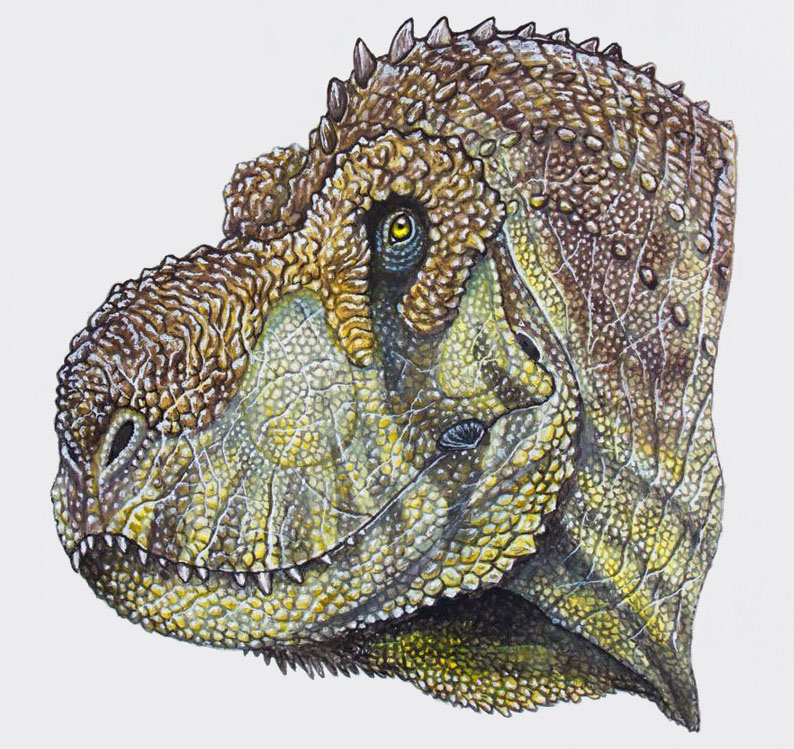
Restoration of the head; while the skull is unknown, the illustration serves to show the soft-tissue thought to have covered abelisaurid heads

Pycnonemosaurus is the best known abelisaurid from Brazil, where most theropod material is presently rare besides preserved teeth and footprints. Even though only a few species are known from Brazil, it is one of the most informative countries concerning the Lower Cretaceous period. Initially, the deposits in which this dinosaur was found were assigned to the Bauru Group, and later more specifically to the Cambambe Formation, with a possible temporal range spanning from the Campanian to the Maastrichtian stages. However, these deposits have since been reassigned to the Campanian-aged Cachoeira do Bom Jardim Formation. This formation is believed to have been deposited in a semi-arid climate, representing the intermediate parts of alluvial fans.

Pycnonemosaurus was a predator, probably preying on titanosaurs found in the same locality. Its teeth were small yet sharp, and were used to get a hold of struggling prey as the abelisaur shook and tore them apart.

== See also ==
- Timeline of ceratosaur research
