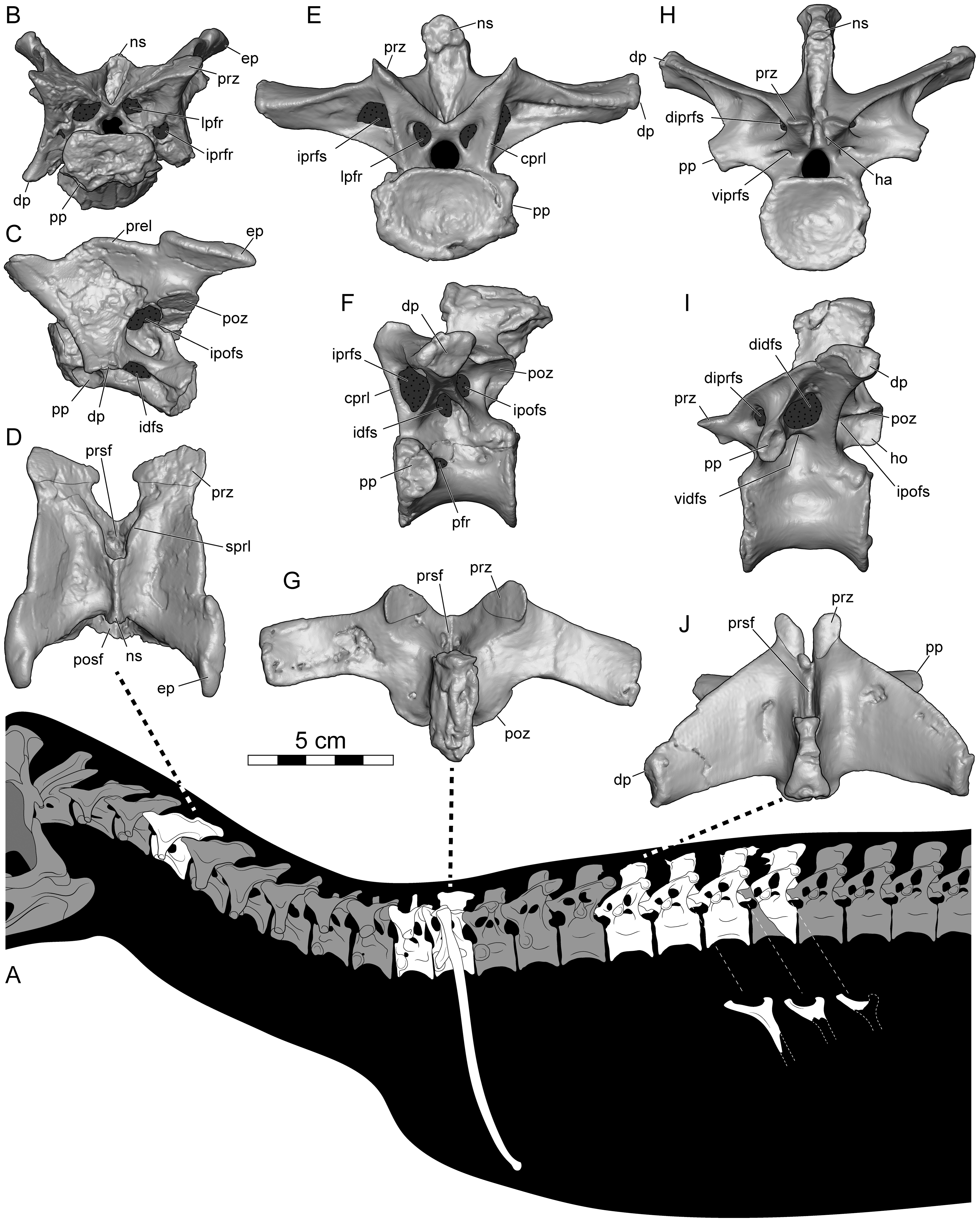
- Diagram showing known elements

Scientific classification
- Kingdom: Animalia
- Phylum: Chordata
- Class: Reptilia
- Clade: Dinosauria
- Clade: Saurischia
- Clade: Theropoda
- Superfamily: †Abelisauroidea
- Genus: †Dahalokely; Farke & Sertich, 2013

Type species
- †Dahalokely tokana Farke & Sertich, 2013

= Dahalokely =

Dahalokely Temporal range: Turonian ~94.3–89.3 Ma

Extinct genus of dinosaurs

Dahalokely is an extinct genus of carnivorous abelisauroid theropod dinosaur from the Late Cretaceous (Turonian) of Madagascar.

== Discovery ==
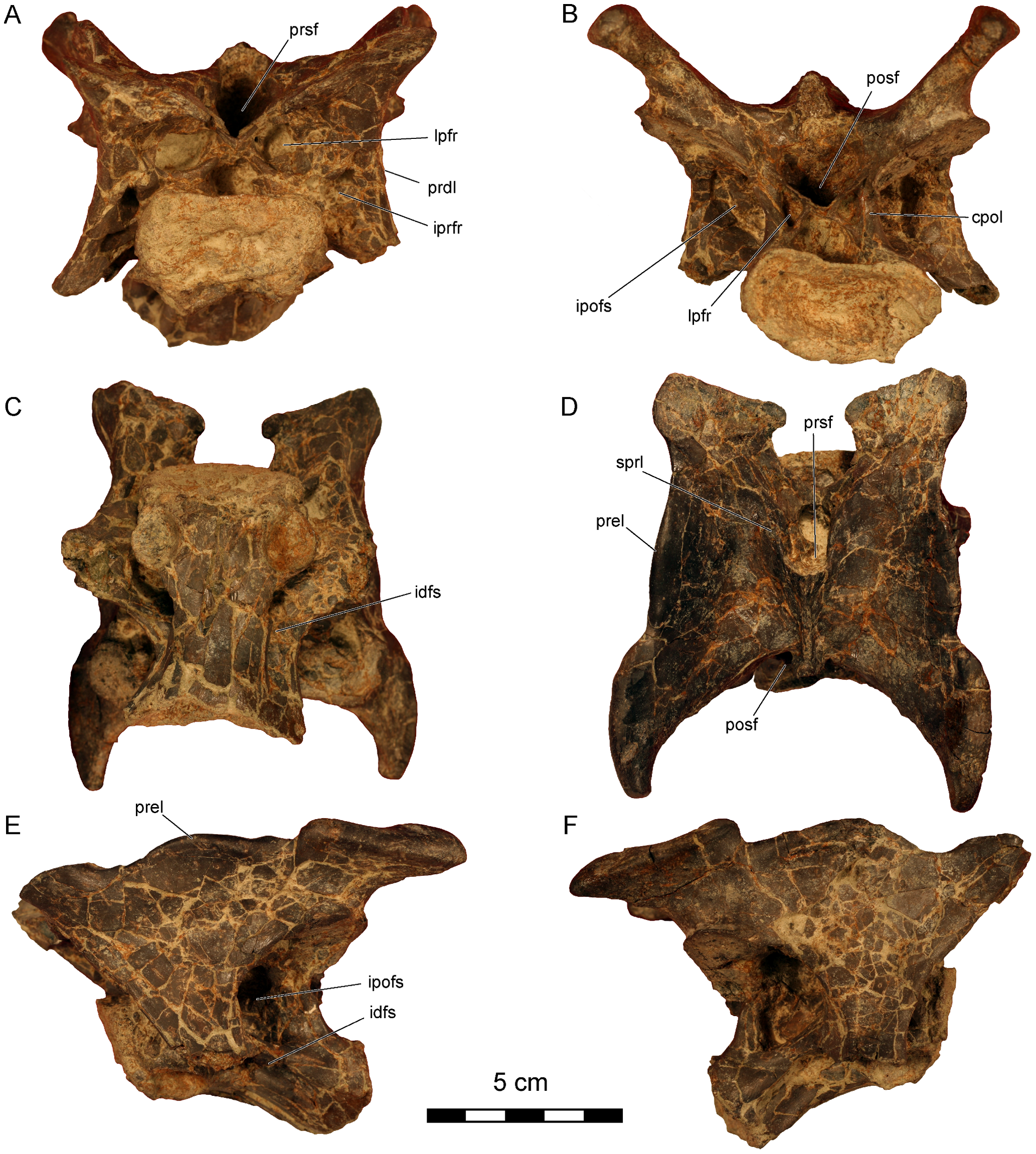
Cervical vertebra.

In 2007, during an expedition by Andrew Farke to the north of Madagascar, Joseph Sertich discovered near Antsiranana the remains of a theropod new to science. In 2010, these were completely excavated by Sertich and Liva Ratsimbaholison. The fossils were then transported to the United States of America to be prepared, repaired, and scanned at Stony Brook University. After casts had been made and stored in the Raymond M. Alf Museum of Paleontology with inventory number RAM 16010, the original fossils were returned to Madagascar and added to the collection of the University of Antananarivo.

The type species, Dahalokely tokana, was named by Farke and Sertich in 2013. The generic name, Dahalokely, means "small thief" in Malagasy, deriving from its estimated length of 3.5 m (11.5 ft), smaller than those of known abelisaurids. The specific name, tokana, means "lonely" in the same language in reference to the isolation of the Madagascan subcontinent. During the Turonian, Madagascar and India were part of the same landmass that had separated from the rest of Gondwana. Dahalokely is the only dinosaur known from Madagascar when the island was separate from Gondwana but still connected with India, forming Indo-Madagascar. In the ZooBank, the genus has the Life Science Identifier 8147803A-D4BE-4BA9-9701-D853E 37DE411 and the species the LSID AFAE32BB-123A-45D4-B931-4FF2A ABAF41C.

The holotype, UA 9855, was uncovered in what is informally named the Ambolafotsy Formation, a Turonian-age deposit of the Diego Basin in northern Madagascar, about 93 million years old. It consists of a partial skeleton lacking the skull of a subadult individual, preserving vertebrae and ribs. These include the fifth neck vertebra; the first, second, sixth, seventh, eighth, and ninth dorsal vertebrae; the left dorsal rib; the upper parts of two right ribs; the lower ends of two ribs; and some rib fragments. The identification of the position of these elements is tentative. They were not found in articulation but were assumed to represent the same individual as they were discovered not a metre apart.

== Description ==
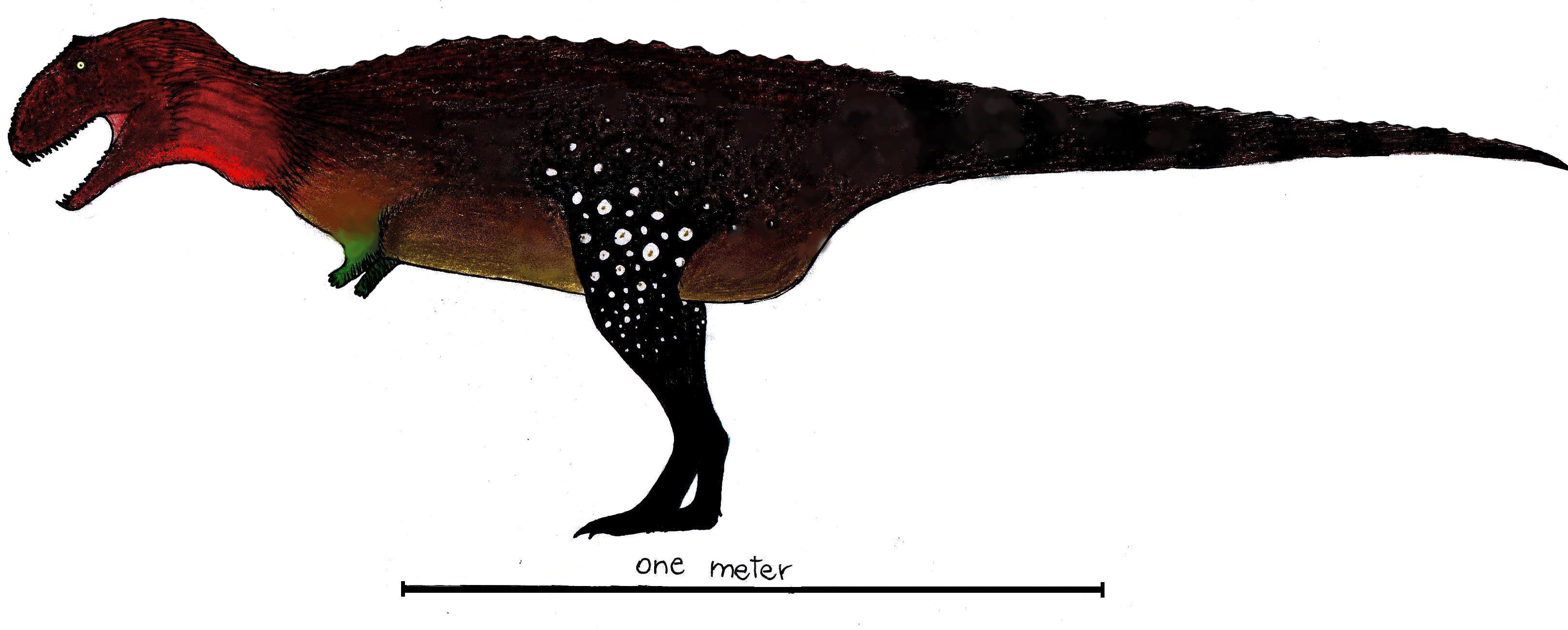
Speculative life restoration

Initial size estimates of Dahalokely, at 3.5 m (11.5 ft), were based on the assumption it was built like an abelisaurid. Should it have had the more elongated build of the noasaurids, it would have been 4.2–5.6 m (13.8–18.4 ft) long. It was estimated as being 3.8 m (12.5 ft) in length in 2016.

The describing authors established several unique derived traits, autapomorphies. The cervical vertebra has a lamina, bone sheet, between the front joint process, the prezygapophysis, and a rear process, the epipophysis, the edge of which lamina is markedly convex, the convex part being longer than the vertebral body and separated from both the prezygapophysis and the epipophysis by conspicuous notches. With the first and second dorsal vertebrae, the prezygapophysis and the lamina between it and the vertebral body are arranged on a vertical line, the joint facet of the prezygapophysis and the front vertebral body face being positioned in the same plane. With the second dorsal vertebra, the joint facets of the rear joint processes, the postzygapophyses, are strongly concave. From at least the sixth dorsal vertebra onwards, the fossa or hollowed-out area, below the prezygapophysis, is divided into two smaller depressions.

== Classification ==
In 2013, Dahalokely was assigned to the Abelisauroidea. The phylogenetic position of Dahalokely among abelisauroids is uncertain. Its vertebrae and ribs have features of both main groups of abelisauroids, the Noasauridae and the Abelisauridae. A phylogenetic analysis published along with its first description found Dahalokely to be a basal noasaurid, but this result was only weakly supported. The incompleteness of the remains and the lack of material that overlaps with known skeletal elements of other abelisauroid species means that the relationships of Dahalokely within the Abelisauroidea are hard to determine. In 2014, Dahalokely was placed as a basal noasaurid.

A phylogeny from 2018 recovered Dahalokely as forming a clade with the Indian abelisaurid Rahiolisaurus within majungasaurinae. Only the phylogenies for Abelisauridae is depicted here.

- Abelisauridae
  - Rugops
  - - Abelisaurus
    - - Ilokelesia
      - Carnotaurinae
        - Majungasaurinae
          - Arcovenator
          - - Indosaurus
            - Majungasaurus
            - Rajasaurus
          - - Dahalokely
            - Rahiolisaurus
        - Brachyrostra
          - - Ekrixinatosaurus
            - Skorpiovenator
          - Furileusauria
            - Viavenator
            - Pycnonemosaurus
            - Quilmesaurus
            - - Carnotaurus
              - Aucasaurus

In the 2021 description of Llukalkan, both Rahiolisaurus and Dahalokely were recovered as basal brachyrostran carnotaurines.

- Abelisauridae
  - Kryptops
  - - Rugops
    - - Majungasaurinae
        - - Genusaurus
          - Arcovenator
        - - Rajasaurus
          - Indosaurus
          - Majungasaurus
      - Brachyrostra
        - Xenotarsosaurus
        - - - Dahalokely
            - Rahiolisaurus
          - - - Ilokelesia
              - - Ekrixinatosaurus
                - Skorpiovenator
            - Furileusauria
              - Llukalkan
              - Pycnonemosaurus
              - Quilmesaurus
              - Viavenator
              - Carnotaurini
                - Carnotaurus
                - - Aucasaurus
                  - Abelisaurus

However, two separate studies from 2018 and 2022 instead recovered Dahalokely as a noasaurid based on their phylogenetic analyses.
