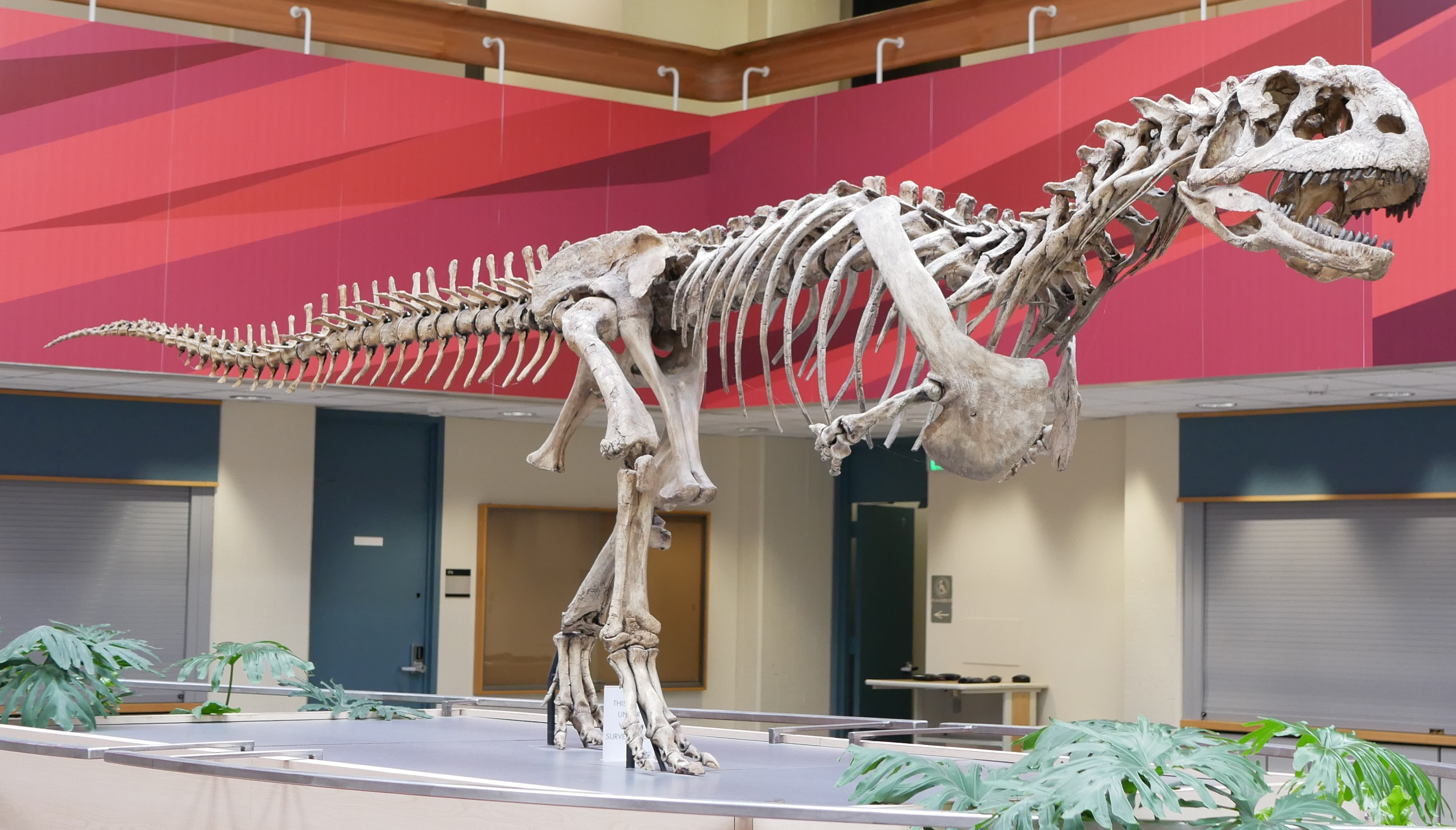
- Majungasaurus crenatissimus mounted skeleton, Stony Brook University

Scientific classification
- Kingdom: Animalia
- Phylum: Chordata
- Class: Reptilia
- Clade: Dinosauria
- Clade: Saurischia
- Clade: Theropoda
- Family: †Abelisauridae
- Subfamily: †Majungasaurinae; Tortosa et al., 2014

Type species
- †Majungasaurus crenatissimus (Depéret, 1896 [originally Megalosaurus]) Lavocat, 1955

Subgroups
- †Abelisaurus?; †Arcovenator; †Dahalokely?; †Indosaurus; †Majungasaurus; †Rahiolisaurus?; †Rajasaurus

Synonyms
- Majungasaurini Tortosa et al., 2014 vide Delcourt, 2018

= Majungasaurinae =

Majungasaurinae Temporal range: Late Cretaceous, 94–66 Ma

Extinct subfamily of reptiles

Majungasaurinae (after Majungasaurus, itself named after the city of Mahajanga in Madagascar) is a subfamily of large carnivorous theropods from the Upper Cretaceous, found in Madagascar, India, Spain, and France. It is a subgroup within the theropod family Abelisauridae, a Gondwanan clade known for their thick and often horned skulls and vestigial arms. The two subfamilies of Abelisauridae are the Carnotaurinae, best known from the South American Carnotaurus, and the Majungasaurinae, consisting of Madagascar's Majungasaurus and its closest relatives. Their ancestors emerged in the Middle Jurassic, and the clade lasted until the Upper Cretaceous.

The majungasaurines were mid-sized, bipedal predators, but relatively slow moving. Their stout legs were built for striding, not running. They had tall, deep heads with powerful jaws, but small forearms without carpals in the wrists. Because of their slow gait and small arms, they likely preyed upon the larger, slower sauropods rather than the smaller, faster ornithopods. Their ancestors lived on a unified southern continent, Gondwana, in the Early Cretaceous, but as the land mass divided, they became distinct from their South American relatives and eventually from each other.

== Anatomical identification ==
The abelisaurids all possess distinct, vestigial, and immobile forelimbs, with highly reduced manual phalanges. Carnotaurus and Majungasaurus are closely related, but are distinguish by several skeletal features. Carnotaurus has 11 dorsal vertebrae, but Majungasaurus has 13. Carnotaurus has short dentary bones and an almost vertical ramus, while that of Majungasaurus curved backward and had notable caudal projections. Majungasaurines also have low, wide antorbital fenestrae, a wide triangular plate posterior to the parietal, two holes for a cerebral vein by the sagittal crest, and a wide groove on the occipital condyle. These differences are important because derived abelisaurids are classed as either majungasaurines or carnotaurines based on their synapomorphies.

== History of study ==
The first majungasaurine to be uncovered was Majungasaurus, discovered in Madagascar in 1896, but was named as a species of Megalosaurus. Indosaurus and Indosuchus were both discovered in India and described in 1933 by Charles Alfred Matley and Friedrich von Huene as allosaurids. The name Majungasaurus was erected by René Lavocat in 1955 for some teeth and a dentary, which showed that the animal was distinct from Megalosaurus. In 1996, a species, Majungatholus, was erected for a supposed pachycephalosaurid from Madagascar, but this turned out to belong to a specimen of Majungasaurus in 1991 that paleontologist Jose Bonaparte theorized that these and many other theropods belonged to the same family, the abelisaurids. Tortosa et al., 2014 created a new subfamily of abelisaurids, the Majungasaurinae, which unified abelisaurids from Europe, Madagascar, and India into a single clade.

== Classification ==
=== Taxonomy ===
- Family Abelisauridae
  - Subfamily Majungasaurinae
    - Arcovenator
    - Genusaurus
    - Indosaurus
    - Majungasaurus
    - Rahiolisaurus
    - Rajasaurus

=== Phylogeny ===
The clade Majungasaurinae is relatively new, proposed in March 2014 by paleontologist Thierry Tortosa and colleagues in the description of Arcovenator. It is defined as all abelisaurids more closely related to Majungasaurus than to Carnotaurus. The cladogram below shows the result of the study's phylogenetic analysis.

- Abelisauridae
  - Kryptops
  - Rugops
  - Genusaurus
  - MCF-PVPH-237 abelisaurid
  - Xenotarsosaurus
  - Tarascosaurus
  - La Boucharde abelisaurid
  - - Majungasaurinae
      - Pourcieux abelisaurid
      - Arcovenator
      - Majungasaurus
      - Indosaurus
      - Rahiolisaurus
      - Rajasaurus
    - Brachyrostra
      - Ilokelesia
      - - Ekrixinatosaurus
        - - Skorpiovenator
          - - Carnotaurini
              - Abelisaurus
              - Aucasaurus
              - Pycnonemosaurus
              - Quilmesaurus
              - Carnotaurus

The following cladogram is a consensus tree primarily based on a paper describing ontogeny in Limusaurus. Only the phylogeny for the Abelisauridae is depicted here.

- Abelisauridae
  - Rugops
  - - Abelisaurus
    - - Ilokelesia
      - Carnotaurinae
        - Majungasaurinae
          - Arcovenator
          - - Indosaurus
            - Majungasaurus
            - Rajasaurus
          - - Dahalokely
            - Rahiolisaurus
        - Brachyrostra
          - - Ekrixinatosaurus
            - Skorpiovenator
          - Furileusauria
            - Viavenator
            - Pycnonemosaurus
            - Quilmesaurus
            - - Carnotaurus
              - Aucasaurus

In the 2021 description of Llukalkan, both Rahiolisaurus and Dahalokely were placed outside of Majungasaurinae as basal brachyrostrans. It agreed with the existence of a clade comprising Majungasaurus, Indosaurus, and Rajasaurus, but also found Arcovenator and Genusaurus to form a sister taxon relationship.

- Abelisauridae
  - Kryptops
  - - Rugops
    - - Majungasaurinae
        - - Genusaurus
          - Arcovenator
        - - Rajasaurus
          - Indosaurus
          - Majungasaurus
      - Brachyrostra
        - Xenotarsosaurus
        - - - Dahalokely
            - Rahiolisaurus
          - - - Ilokelesia
              - - Ekrixinatosaurus
                - Skorpiovenator
            - Furileusauria
              - Llukalkan
              - Pycnonemosaurus
              - Quilmesaurus
              - Viavenator
              - Carnotaurini
                - Carnotaurus
                - - Aucasaurus
                  - Abelisaurus

== Paleobiology ==
=== Geographic range ===
The majungasaurines and their carnotaurine sister group emerged in what is now South America. From there, they spread to the rest of Gondwana - modern Africa and India, and presumably Australia and Antarctica, as well. Fragmentary evidence of abelisaurs in southern France indicates they may have spread into Europe, also, but the relationship of these species to the rest of the Majungasaurinae is not well established.

=== Feeding habits ===
Like all abelisaurs, the majungasaurines were carnivorous and had bulbous teeth, short heads, and strong necks. This meant that their wide jaws were very powerful and could crush their prey's trachea or vertebrae once they bit down. Majungasaurus is known to have preyed upon medium-sized sauropods such as Rapetosaurus, and its teeth marks have been found on the ribs of other Majungasaurus bones. Whether it actively hunted members of its own species or merely cannibalized their scavenged remains is unknown. This behavior has not been observed in any other majungasaurines.

== See also ==
- Timeline of ceratosaur research
