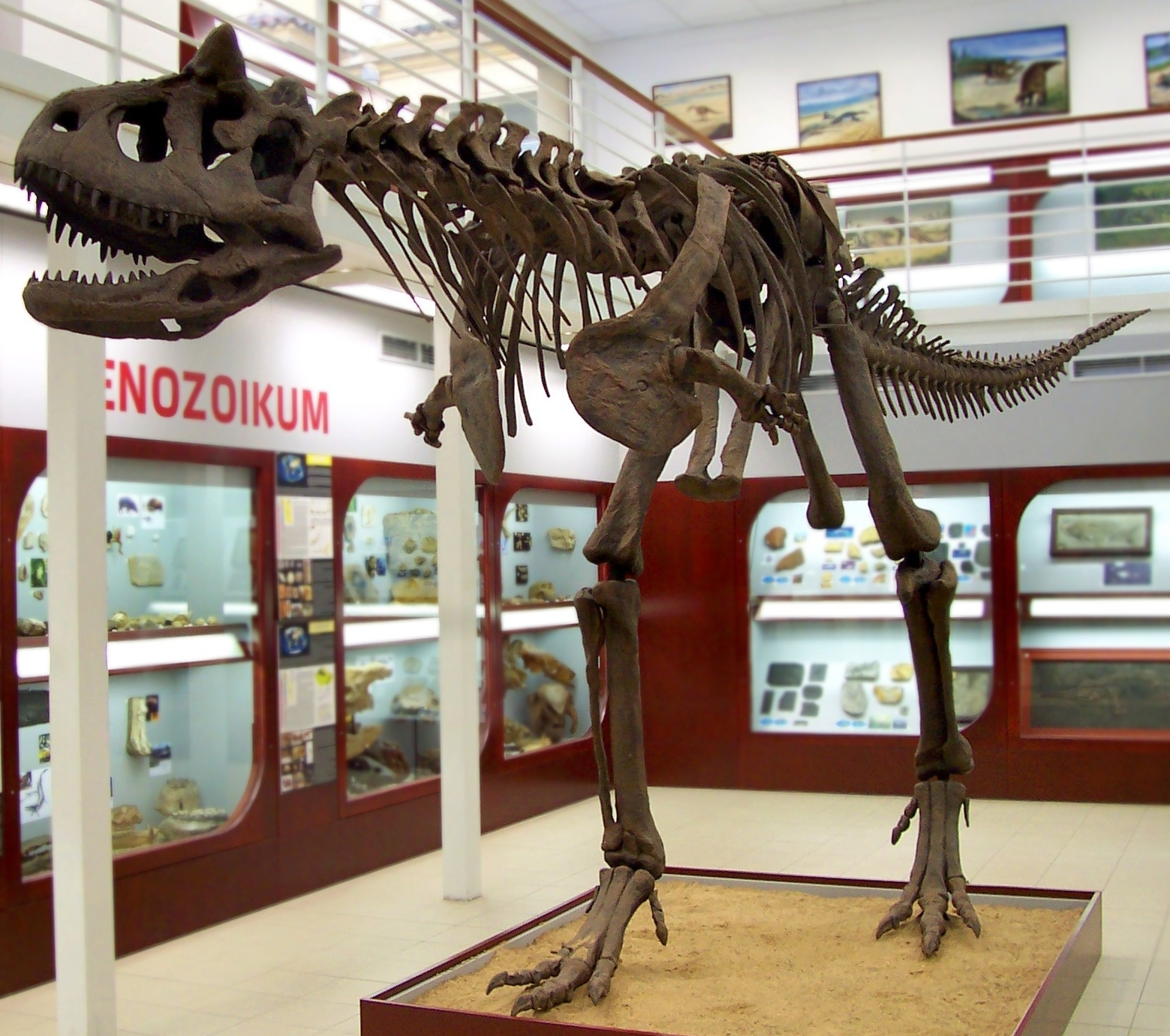
- Mounted cast of a Carnotaurus sastrei skeleton, Chlupáč Museum, Prague

Scientific classification
- Kingdom: Animalia
- Phylum: Chordata
- Class: Reptilia
- Clade: Dinosauria
- Clade: Saurischia
- Clade: Theropoda
- Family: †Abelisauridae
- Clade: †Brachyrostra; Canale et al., 2008

Subgroups
- †Dahalokely?; †Ekrixinatosaurus; †Elemgasem; †Guemesia; †Ilokelesia; †Rahiolisaurus?; †Skorpiovenator; †Thanos; †Xenotarsosaurus?; †Furileusauria Filippi et al., 2016; †Caletodraco; †Genusaurus; †Llukalkan; †Niebla; †Pycnonemosaurus; †Viavenator; †Carnotaurini Coria et al., 2002; †Abelisaurus?; †Aucasaurus; †Carnotaurus; †Koleken; †Quilmesaurus

= Brachyrostra =

Brachyrostrans Temporal range: Cretaceous, 111–66 Ma

Extinct subfamily of reptiles

Brachyrostra (meaning "short snouts") is a clade within the theropod dinosaur family Abelisauridae. It includes the famous genera Carnotaurus, Aucasaurus, potentially Abelisaurus as well as their close relatives from the Cretaceous Period of Argentina and Brazil plus Caletodraco from France. The group was first proposed in an analysis conducted by Juan Canale and colleagues in 2008. They found that all South American abelisaurids described up to that point grouped together as a sub-clade of Abelisauridae, which they named based on the relatively unusual shape of their skulls (in comparison with other theropods). They defined the clade Brachyrostra as "all the abelisaurids more closely related to Carnotaurus sastrei than to Majungasaurus crenatissimus."

== Paleobiology ==
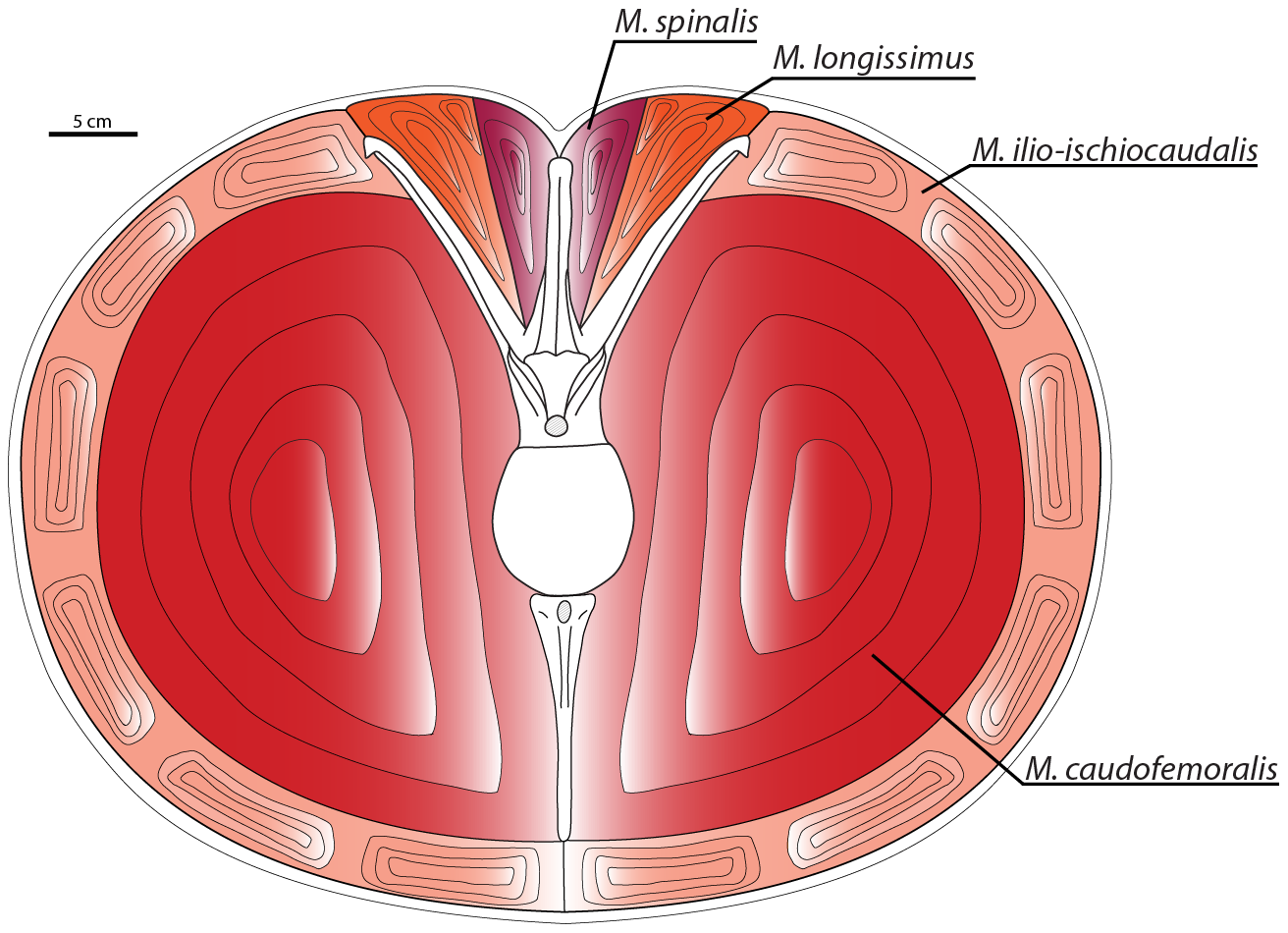
Cross section through the tail of Carnotaurus, showing the enlarged caudofemoralis muscle and the V-shaped caudal ribs

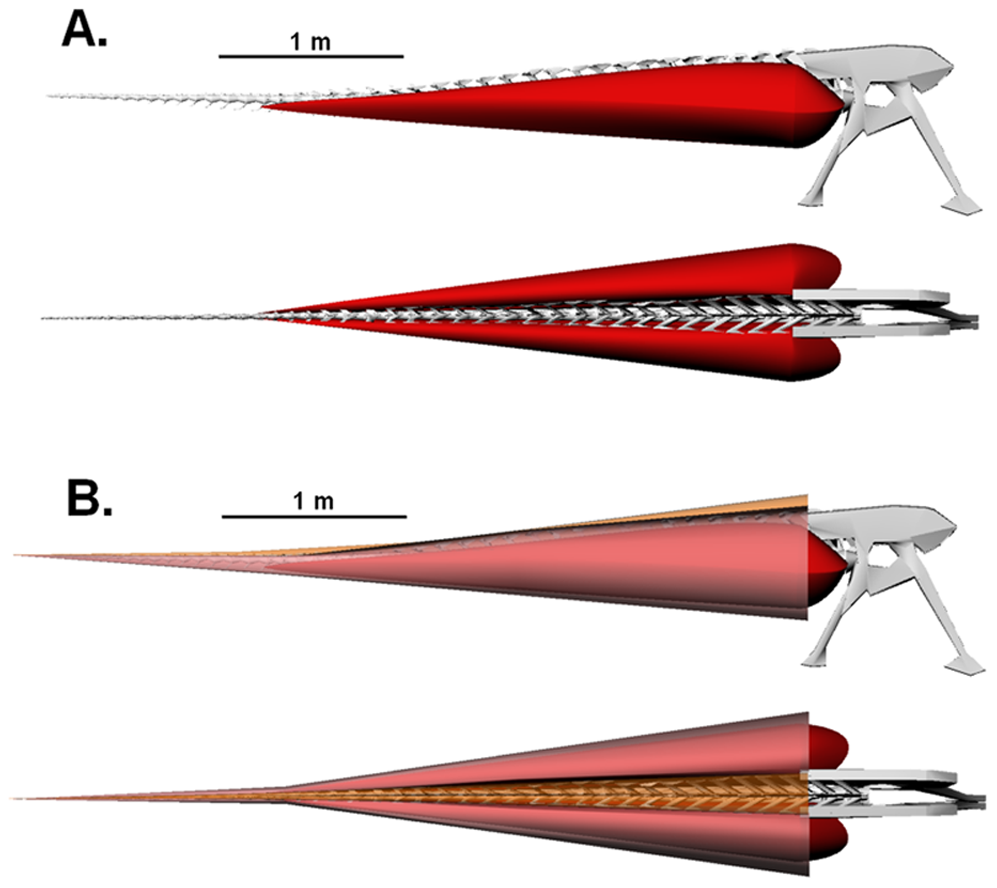
3D reconstructions of the tail muscles, tail, and pelvic bones seen from the side and above

=== Anatomy ===
Brachyrostrans were relatively lightly built compared to other large theropods, ranging in size from 6.1–7.8 m (20–26 ft) and 1400–2000 kg (1.6–2.3 short tons) in weight. They are considered the most derived abelisaurids, with traits like very short, narrow skulls and extremely reduced forearms, even more so than other abelisaurids. Many brachyrostrans had horns or rugosities on the frontal and nasal bones, which have been interpreted as bearing cornified structures or dermal armor.

=== Diet and feeding ===
Studies of the skull anatomy of the most well-known species, Carnotaurus sastrei, lead to debate over what type of prey these animals hunted. Studies by Mazzetta et al. in 1998, 2004, and 2009 suggest that the jaw structure in Carnotaurus was built for swift, rather than strong, bites, with adaptations for mandibular kinesis to assist in swallowing small prey items whole. Surprisingly, it exhibits a form of paracraniokinesis in which the dentary bone articulates against the surangular bone, further jointing the lower jaw and hypothetically allowing this animal a wider array of hunting strategies.

However, in 1998 and 2009, Robert Bakker and Francois Therrien and colleagues contested this finding, stating that Carnotaurus had the exact same skull adaptations (short snout, small teeth, and a fortified occiput) as the Jurassic theropod Allosaurus, which presumably preyed upon large animals by gradual jaw slashing.

=== Locomotion ===
Mazzetta et al. 1998–1999 and Phil Currie et al. 2011 found Carnotaurus to be a swift-running predator with semicursorial adaptations such as femoral resistance against bending moments and a hypertrophied caudofemoralis muscle, the primary locomotory muscle in theropods which was located in the tail and pulled the femur backwards. This enlarged caudofemoralis, giving them a speed estimate of 48–56 km/h (30–35 mph), allowed brachyrostrans to be one of the fastest-running large theropod groups yet known.

== Phylogeny ==
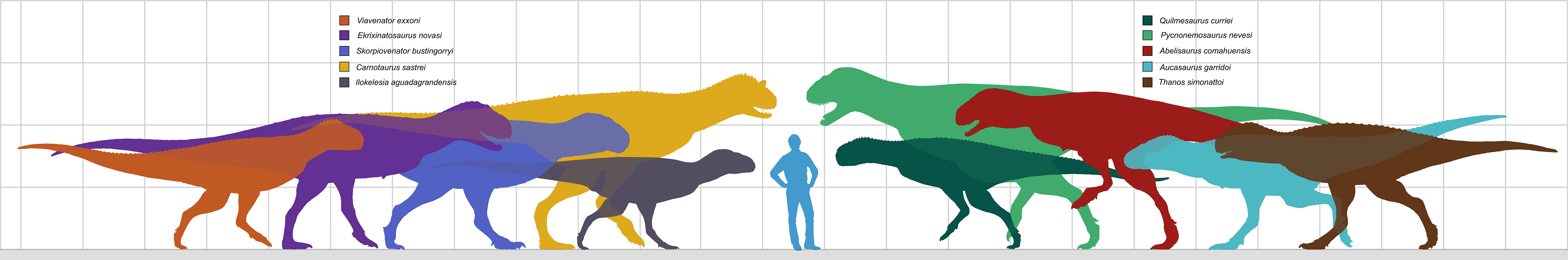
Size comparison of various genera within Brachyrostra

Within Brachyrostra, there is a slightly more restrictive clade, called Furileusauria ("stiff back lizards"). They represent some of the larger brachyrostrans, with an average length of 7.1 ± 2.1 m (23.3 ± 6.9 ft). The taxon is a stem-based clade and is defined as the most inclusive clade containing Carnotaurus sastrei but not Ilokelesia aguadagrandensis, Skorpiovenator bustingorryi, or Majungasaurus crenatissimus.

Synapomorphies of Furileusauria recovered by Filippi and colleagues include: the presence of a tip in the middle area of the posterior surface of the ventral process of the postorbital, the presence of a knob followed by a deep notch in the postorbital-squamosal contact, the absence of fenestra between the frontal and lacrimal bones, an anterior projection of the distal end of the cervical epiphophyses, a posterior margin of the postzygapophyses which is level with the intervertebral articulation in dorsal vertebrae, a crescent-shaped morphology of the distal tip of the transverse processes in anterior and middle caudal vertebrae, transverse processes of anterior caudal vertebrae that is distally expanded and projected anteriorly, a convex external margin of the transverse processes in anterior caudal vertebrae, and a downturned process on the cnemial crest of the tibia.

A more restrictive clade within Furileusauria is the tribe Carnotaurini. This group is a node-based clade and was first proposed by paleontologists Rodolfo Coria, Luis Chiappe, and Lowell Dingus in 2002, being defined as a clade containing "Carnotaurus sastrei, Aucasaurus garridoi, their most recent common ancestor, and all of its descendants." The tribe Carnotaurini was named in 2002 by Rodolfo Coria et al. in 2002 after their discovery of Aucasaurus garridoi. Their morphological definition of it is by several synapomorphies of the clade, with two ambiguous ones: "the presence of hyposphene–hypantrum articulations in the proximal and middle sections of the caudal series, and cranial processes in the epipophyses of the cervical vertebrae." They defined more ambiguous synapomorphies due to the homologous materials not yet found in all other abelisaurids being: "a very broad coracoid (coracoid maximum width three times the distance across the scapular glenoid area), a humerus with a large and hemispherical head, an extremely short ulna and radius (ulna to humerus ratio 1:3 or less), and frontal prominences (swells or horns) that are located laterally on the skull roof."

In their description of the abelisaurid Llukalkan, Federico Gianechini and colleagues performed a phylogenetic analysis to test the affinities of the new taxon. The simplified strict consensus tree of the analysis is shown below. Similar results have been recovered by other analyses including Coria and colleagues (2002), Canale and colleagues (2008), and Cerroni and colleagues (2020).

- Abelisauridae
  - Kryptops
  - - Rugops
    - - Majungasaurinae
        - - Genusaurus
          - Arcovenator
        - - Rajasaurus
          - Indosaurus
          - Majungasaurus
      - Brachyrostra
        - Xenotarsosaurus
        - - - Dahalokely
            - Rahiolisaurus
          - - - Ilokelesia
              - - Ekrixinatosaurus
                - Skorpiovenator
            - Furileusauria
              - Llukalkan
              - Pycnonemosaurus
              - Quilmesaurus
              - Viavenator
              - Carnotaurini
                - Carnotaurus
                - - Aucasaurus
                  - Abelisaurus

== Geographic distribution ==
Brachyrostrans were initially known exclusively from South America. Members of the group have been unearthed from the Anacleto Formation, the Bajo de la Carpa Formation, the Candeleros Formation, the Huincul Formation, and possibly the Sir Fernandez field of the Allen Formation to the southeast. A single named taxon, Pycnonemosaurus is also known from the Cachoeira do Bom Jardim Formation in Mato Grosso, Brazil. The description of the French taxon Caletodraco, was the first definitive evidence of the clade from outside South America. The Albian taxon Genusaurus, which also hails from France, may also represent a European member of this clade. If it is truly a brachyrostran, it would represent the oldest member of the clade. The enigmatic taxon Dahalokely, from Madagascar may also belong to Brachyrostra, although this remains uncertain.

== See also ==
- Gondwana
- Theropod paleopathology
- Timeline of ceratosaur research
