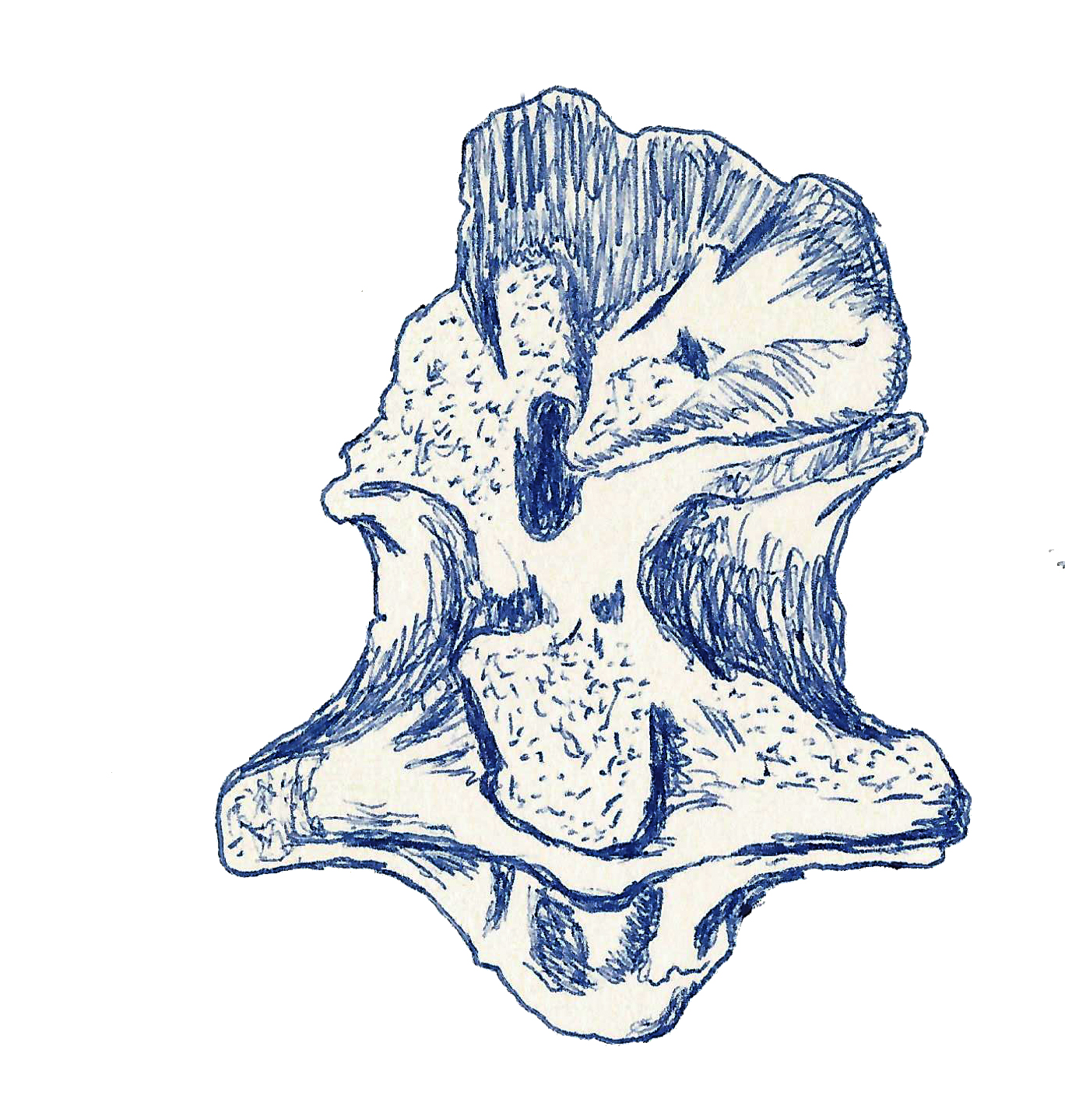
- Holotype Braincase

Scientific classification
- Kingdom: Animalia
- Phylum: Chordata
- Class: Reptilia
- Clade: Dinosauria
- Clade: Saurischia
- Clade: Theropoda
- Family: †Abelisauridae
- Subfamily: †Majungasaurinae
- Genus: †Indosaurus
- Species: †I. matleyi

Binomial name
- †Indosaurus matleyi Huene & Matley, 1933

= Indosaurus =

Indosaurus Temporal range: Late Cretaceous, 69–66 Ma

Genus of theropod dinosaur

Indosaurus (lit. 'Indian lizard') is a genus of carnivorous theropod dinosaur that lived in what is now India, about 69 to 66 million years ago during the Maastrichtian division of the Late Cretaceous.

== Discovery and naming ==
Indosaurus type locality in Carnosaur beds, Bara Simla, Jabalpur, Madhya Pradesh, India

The now-lost holotype was discovered between 1917 and 1919 in Jabalpur, India (GSI K27/565), by Charles Alfred Matley.The type species, Indosaurus matleyi, was named by Huene and Matley in 1933 making Indosaurus the first majungasaurine to be discovered. The generic name refers to India and the specific name honours Matley. This species now also includes Megalosaurus matleyi. Some paleontologists have speculated that Indosuchus, Lametasaurus and Indosaurus should be considered as nomina dubia.

== Description ==
The parietal of the frontal-parietal region is broad whereas the lower surface of the frontal is wide, the transverse crest lies above and behind the orbit. The frontals are concave and decline in to the front of the cranium. The supratemporal fossa is short and broad as in Antrodemus. The incomplete skull is of unusual thickness, although it lacked a dome on frontal bones as seen in Majungasaurus. It would have also lacked the paired frontal horns seen in Carnotaurus. Both Indosuchus and Indosaurus had a conservative skull roof which was dorsoventrally thickened but did not process prominences above the skull roof, similar to the condition seen in Abelisaurus.

The species I. matleyi weighed roughly 700 kg (1,500 lb).

== Classification ==
Originally assigned by Huene to the Allosauridae, Indosaurus is today considered a member of the Abelisauridae family. It shows similarities to the other Abelisaurids from India, such as Rajasaurus and Rahiolisaurus, and is hence usually placed within Abelisauridae, though the fragmentary nature for this taxon makes it difficult to recognize its exact taxonomic validity.

In 2014 Thierry Tortosa erected the subfamily Majungasaurinae. This was to separate Arcovenator, Majungasaurus, Indosaurus, Rahiolisaurus, and Rajasaurus from South American abelisaurids based on physical characteristics such as elongated antorbital fenestrae in front of the eye sockets, and a sagittal crest that widens into a triangular surface towards the front of the head.

It was suggested that the abelisaurids migrated between Africa, Europe, India and Madagascar, which would isolate the South American abelisaurids. It is possible that migration occurred between Europe and India across Africa given its proximity to both, and the volcanic Dras-Kohistan island arc may have allowed island hopping and an indirect path to Asia, though these are still questionable explanations.

The following cladogram was recovered by Tortosa (2014):

- Ceratosauria
  - Ceratosaurus
  - Noasauridae
  - - Abelisauridae
      - - Carnotaurinae
          - Carnotaurus
          - Abelisaurus
      - - Majungasaurinae
          - Rajasaurus
          - Majungasaurus
          - Indosaurus
          - Rahiolisaurus
          - Arcovenator

== Paleoecology ==
Indosaurus lived in the Lameta Formation during the Maastrichtian age of the Cretaceous period. It is known to have lived alongside sauropods like Isisaurus, Jainosaurus and the dubious Titanosaurus, which it may have preyed upon. Other ceratosaurs such as the abelisaurid Rajasaurus, Rahiolisaurus and Indosuchus are known from the formation, along with the noasaurid Laevisuchus. The ichnogenus Deltapodus is also known from the formation, which may belong to the youngest know stegosaurid. The madtsoiid snake Sanajeh was also contemporaneous to Indosaurus.

The rocks of the Lameta formation appear to have been deposited in fluvial or lacustrine conditions. The environment at the time of deposition has alternatively been considered semi-arid, or tropical humid. While some authors have suggested that the Deccan Traps eruptions had a major adverse effect on the climate of India and its dinosaur inhabitants, others have suggested that the effects of the volcanism were relatively mild.

== See also ==
- Timeline of ceratosaur research
