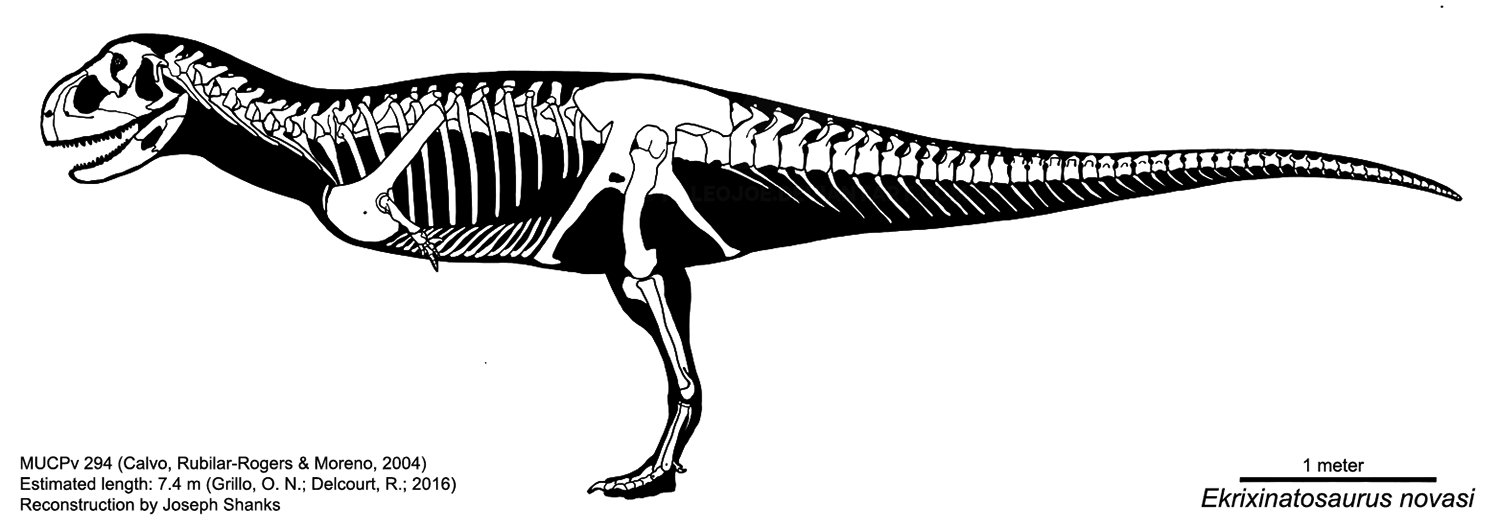
- Skeletal diagram

Scientific classification
- Kingdom: Animalia
- Phylum: Chordata
- Class: Reptilia
- Clade: Dinosauria
- Clade: Saurischia
- Clade: Theropoda
- Family: †Abelisauridae
- Clade: †Brachyrostra
- Genus: †Ekrixinatosaurus; Calvo et al. 2004

Type species
- †Ekrixinatosaurus novasi Calvo et al. 2004

= Ekrixinatosaurus =

Ekrixinatosaurus Temporal range: Albian ~111–106 Ma

Extinct genus of dinosaur

Ekrixinatosaurus ('explosion-born reptile') is a genus of abelisaurid theropod which lived during the Albian stage of the Early Cretaceous. Its fossils have been found in Argentina. Only one species is currently recognized, Ekrixinatosaurus novasi, from which the specific name honors Dr. Fernando Novas for his contributions to the study of abelisaurid theropods, while the genus name refers to the dynamiting of the holotype specimen. It was a large abelisaurid, measuring between 6.5 and 8 m (21 and 26 ft) in length and weighing 800 kg (1,800 lb).

== Discovery and naming ==
The type species, Ekrixinatosaurus novasi, was first described in 2004 by Argentinian paleontologist Jorge Calvo, and Chilean paleontologists David Rubilar-Rogers and Karen Moreno. The fossils were found dispersed over an area of 15 m^{2} in the Candeleros Formation, a geologic formation that outcrops in Río Negro, Neuquén and Mendoza provinces of Argentina. Originally suggested to be the Cenomanian age of the Late Cretaceous, the maximum depositional age of both the Candeleros Formation and the overlying Huincul Formation is re-dated to the early Albian by Maniel et al. (2026), approximately 111.4 ± 1.1 Ma and 106.2 ± 1.0 Ma respectively. The formation consists of red beds where other famous vertebrate animals have been discovered, such as Giganotosaurus, Rebbachisaurus and Andesaurus. The discovery occurred due to excavations for building a gas pipeline conducted by Gasoducto del Pacífico Company in Bajo del Añelo.

Before the discovery of Ekrixinatosaurus, Carnotaurus sastrei and Aucasaurus garridoi were the most complete specimens of the abelisauridae family. The remains of Ekrixinatosaurus helped fill in more information about abelisaur anatomy as it contained portions of the skeleton that were previously unknown, unpublished, or poorly preserved in other specimens. The holotype skeleton (MUCPv-294) was well preserved yet disarticulated. It contained elements including a left and partial right maxillae; basicranium; both dentaries; teeth; cervical, a dorsal, sacral and caudal vertebrae; haemal arches; ribs; ilia, pubis and proximal ischia; left and distal end of right femur; left tibia; left astragalus and calcaneum; proximal end of left fibula and right tibia; metatarsals; phalanges; and a pedal ungual.

== Description ==
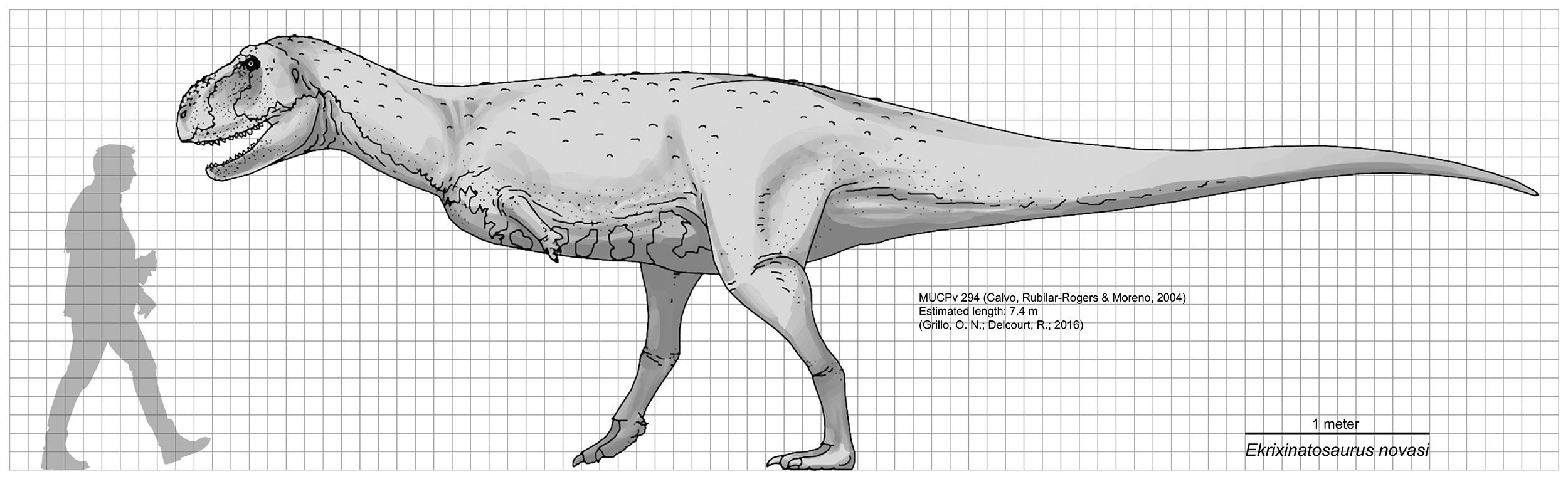
Ekrixinatosaurus compared in size to a human

Ekrixinatosaurus novasi is a large abelisaurid with a relatively large head and robust limbs. The combination of characteristics including a large skull, prominent supraorbital ridge above the dorsal aspect of the orbit, anteroposteriorly compressed cervical vertebrae, and robust, proportionally short hindlimbs with a tibia shorter than femur suggests that this was a massive animal with a great capacity to sustain injuries during intraspecific or interspecific combat. The only known specimen was previously estimated between 6.5 and 8 m (21 and 26 ft) in length and 800 kg (1,800 lb) in body mass, and some suggested that this specimen actually represented the largest abelisaurid yet known at 10 to 11 m (33 to 36 ft) in length, surpassing the type of Carnotaurus. However, it was later noted by other researchers that the latter length estimate of 10 to 11 m (33 to 36 ft) was based only on the absolute size of the skull, ignoring that limb bone comparisons clearly show Carnotaurus was larger, and thus Carnotaurus was larger than Ekrixinatosaurus but with a proportionally smaller head.

=== Skull ===
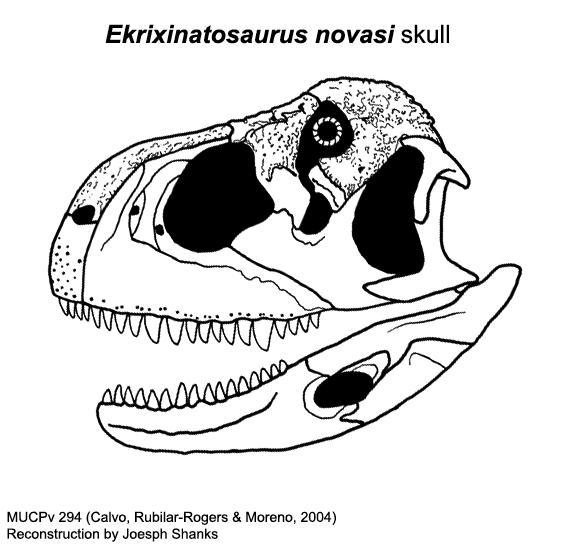
Skull diagram

The skull of Ekrixinatosaurus was boxy and proportionally shorter and deeper than most other large carnivorous dinosaurs. The jaws also curved upward, a trait shared with some other abelisaurs. The skull is estimated to be approximately 83 cm long based on comparisons with Carnotaurus and Majungasaurus, and while Abelisaurus does not have a complete maxilla its preserved size is similar to that of Ekrixinatosaurus. As in other abelisaurids, the facial bones, especially the nasal bones, were sculptured with numerous small holes and spikes. In life, a wrinkled and possibly keratinous skin would have covered these bones. The maxilla was short and contained 16 alveoli, some with short teeth that were flattened laterally with anterior and posterior serrations. The maxilla of Ekrixinatosaurus also exhibits a dorsally projected ascending ramus and a short rostral ramus, suggesting a relatively high skull.

== Classification ==
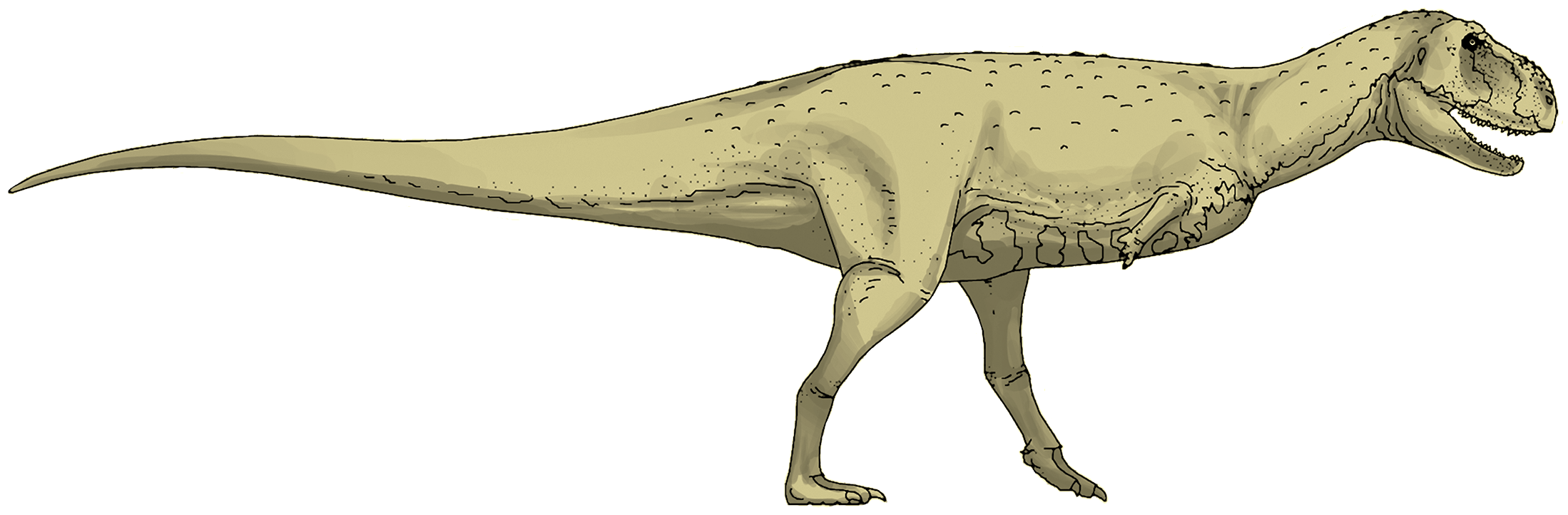
Restoration

In 2004, Ekrixinatosaurus was placed in the Abelisauridae by Calvo and colleagues. Their study contained a preliminary cladistic analysis of the phylogenetic relationships between Ekrixinatosaurus and those abelisaurids of which at the time relatively complete skeletons were known, finding it to be more closely related to Carnotaurini than to Ceratosaurus.

In 2009, Canale and colleagues published a phylogenetic analysis focusing on the South American carnotaurines. In their results, they found that all South American forms (including Skorpiovenator) grouped together as a sub-clade of Carnotaurinae, which they named Brachyrostra, meaning "short snouts". They defined the clade Brachyrostra as "all the abelisaurids more closely related to Carnotaurus sastrei than to Majungasaurus crenatissimus". Within their topology, Canale et al. recovered Skorpiovenator as part of a sister clade to Carnotaurini, including Ekrixinatosaurus and Ilokolesia, and was the sister taxon of the former.

- Carnotaurinae
  - Majungasaurus
  - Brachyrostra
    - Carnotaurini
      - Carnotaurus
      - Aucasaurus
    - - Ilokelesia
      - - Skorpiovenator
        - Ekrixinatosaurus

== Paleoecology ==
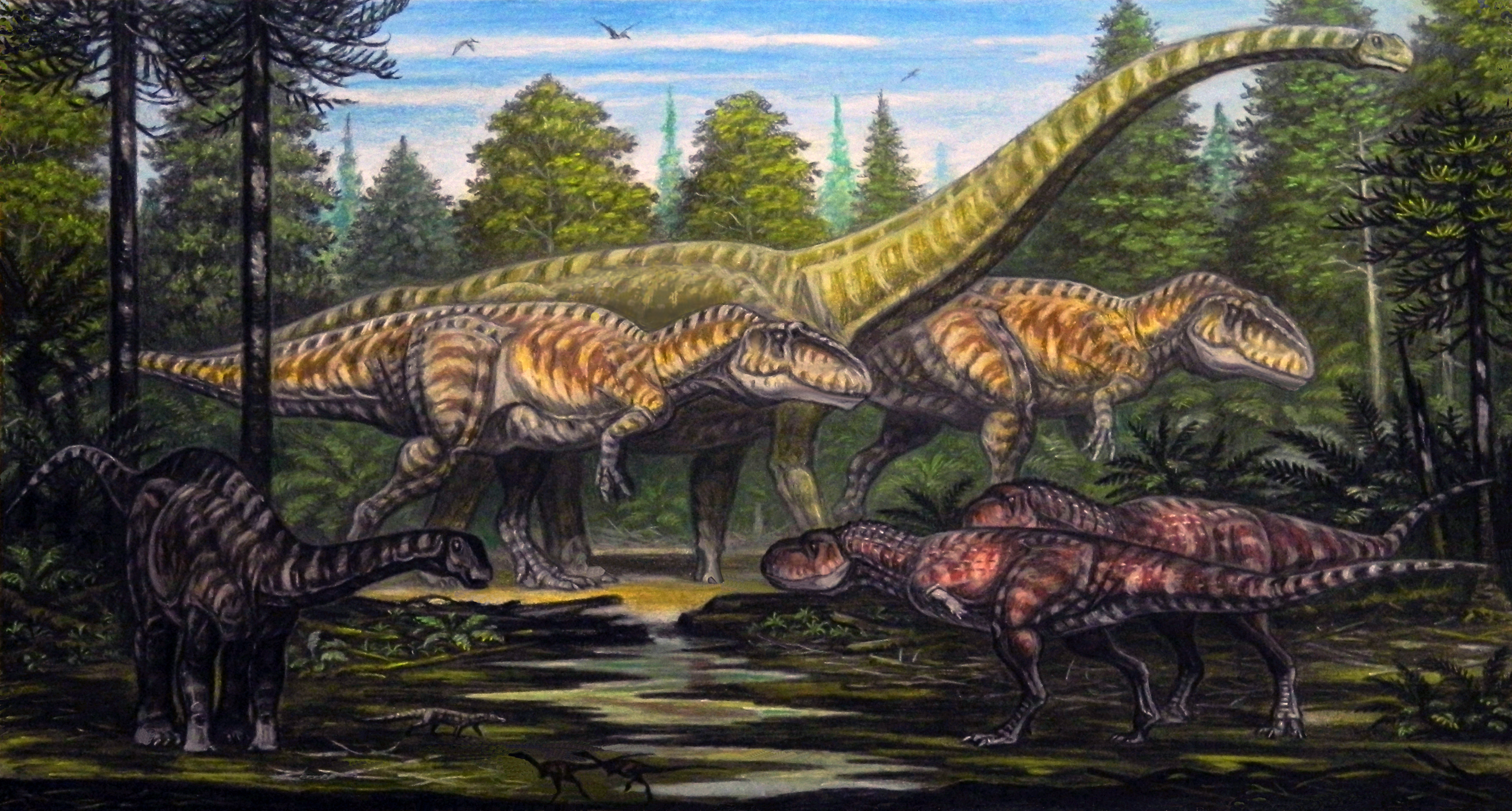
Restoration of Ekrixinatosaurus (front right) with contemporary dinosaurs

Ekrixinatosaurus was found in the red beds of the Candeleros Formation, which has yielded a wide variety of vertebrates. It shared its environment with the titanosaurian sauropod Andesaurus and the rebbachisaurid sauropods Limaysaurus and Nopcsaspondylus. Iguanodont ornithischian remains have reportedly also been found. The carcharodontosaurid Giganotosaurus was possibly the apex predator. Smaller predators also inhabited the area, including the dromaeosaurid Buitreraptor, the alvarezsauroid Alnashetri, and the basal coelurosaurian Bicentenaria. Other primitive reptiles lived in the area, such as the primitive snake Najash, the crocodile Araripesuchus, along with turtles, fish, pipid frogs and mammals. Pterosaurs also lived in the area, as evidenced by pterosaur tracks. A wide variety of dinosaur trackways have also been found in the Candeleros Formation, suggesting significant activity in the area.

Recent studies on Gondwanan theropods have interpreted abelisauroids as modest and medium-sized dinosaurs that co-occurred with giant carcharodontosaurids during the Early and early Late Cretaceous. It has been hypothesized that it was only after extinction of these carcharodontosaurids that abelisaurids were able to diversify into more robust forms that occupied the niche of top predators of their ecosystems. However, it has been observed that both Giganotosaurus and Ekrixinatosaurus were among the largest of their respective clades yet existed at the same time, which refutes this hypothesis. Both these animals occupied the role of the largest carnivores; however, it is uncertain whether they played different ecological roles (such as active predation vs. scavenging). In addition, the known distribution of abelisaurids in South America, Madagascar and India brings the hypothesis of a dispersion route between these areas by a terrestrial bridge called the Kerguelen Plateau that formed prior to the separation of Africa and South America.

== See also ==
- Timeline of ceratosaur research
