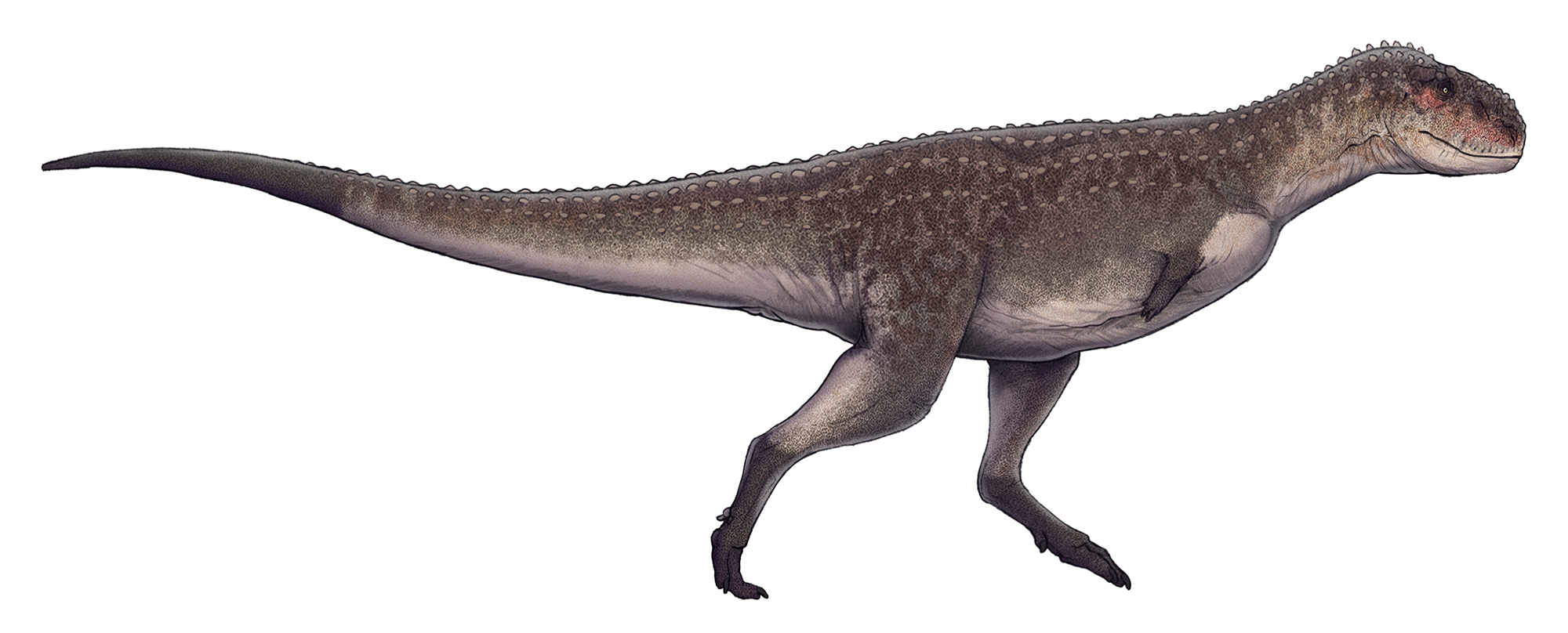
- Life restoration of Viavenator exxoni

Scientific classification
- Kingdom: Animalia
- Phylum: Chordata
- Class: Reptilia
- Clade: Dinosauria
- Clade: Saurischia
- Clade: Theropoda
- Family: †Abelisauridae
- Clade: †Furileusauria
- Genus: †Viavenator; Filippi et al., 2016

Type species
- †Viavenator exxoni Filippi et al., 2016

= Viavenator =

Viavenator Temporal range: Santonian ~86–83 Ma

Extinct genus of dinosaurs

Viavenator (meaning "road hunter") is a genus of carnivorous abelisaurid theropod dinosaur that lived in the Santonian-aged (Late Cretaceous) Bajo de la Carpa Formation of Argentina. Only a single species is known, V. exxoni, formally described in 2016 by Filippi and colleagues.

== Classification ==
Filippi et al. classified Viavenator to a new clade known as the Furileusauria, which includes it as well as Carnotaurus. This would mean the former taxon was closer to the latter than Majungasaurus. It would have measured 5.6 metres (18 ft) in length.

== Palaeobiology ==
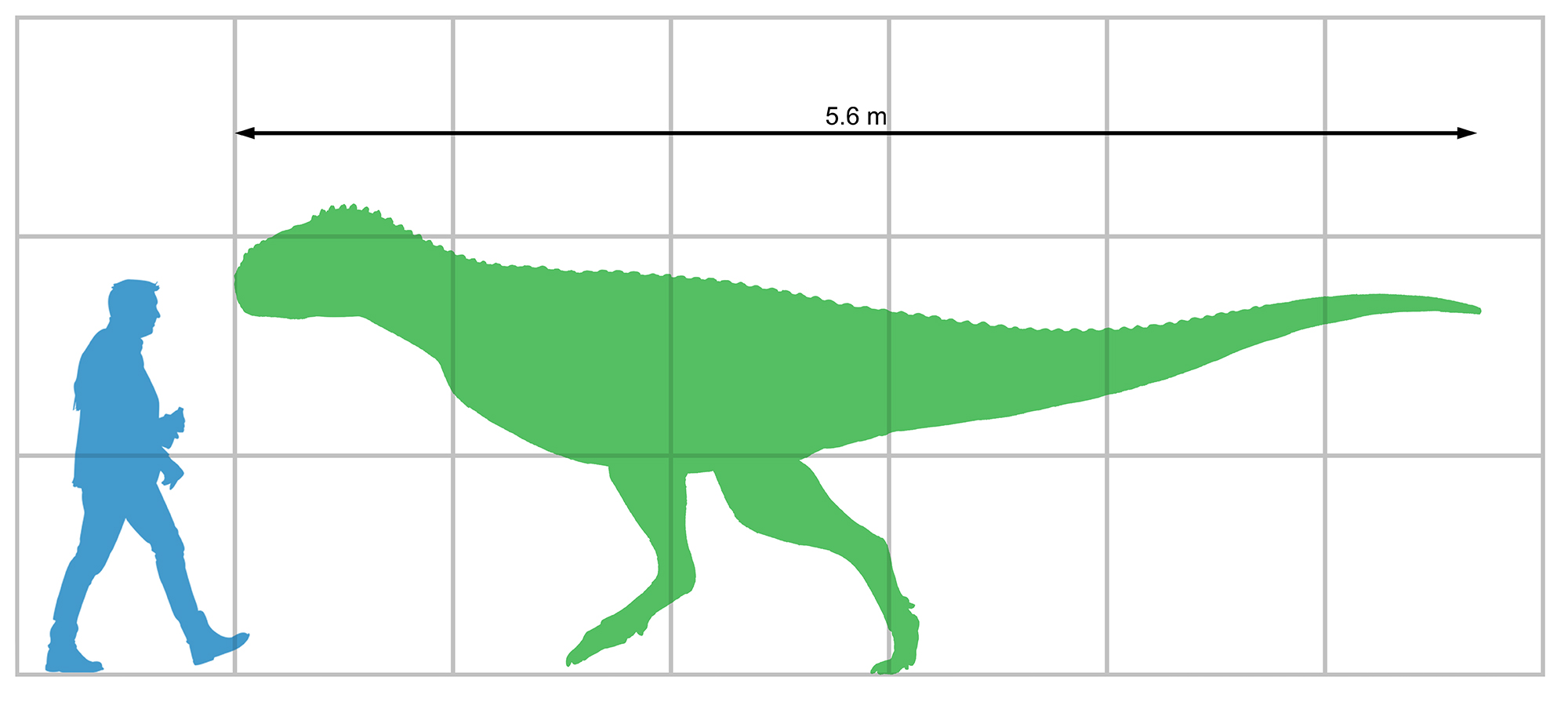
Size comparison of Viavenator to a human

Viavenator possessed a brain morphology similar to Aucasaurus, another South American abelisaurid, and had a similar inner ear. Compared to the Madagascan abelisaurid Majungasaurus, Viavenator was more reliant on quick movements of the head and sophisticated gaze stabilization mechanisms. However, both genera had a similar range of hearing according to the examinations and subsequent CT scans of the cranium.

== See also ==
- Timeline of ceratosaur research
- 2016 in paleontology
