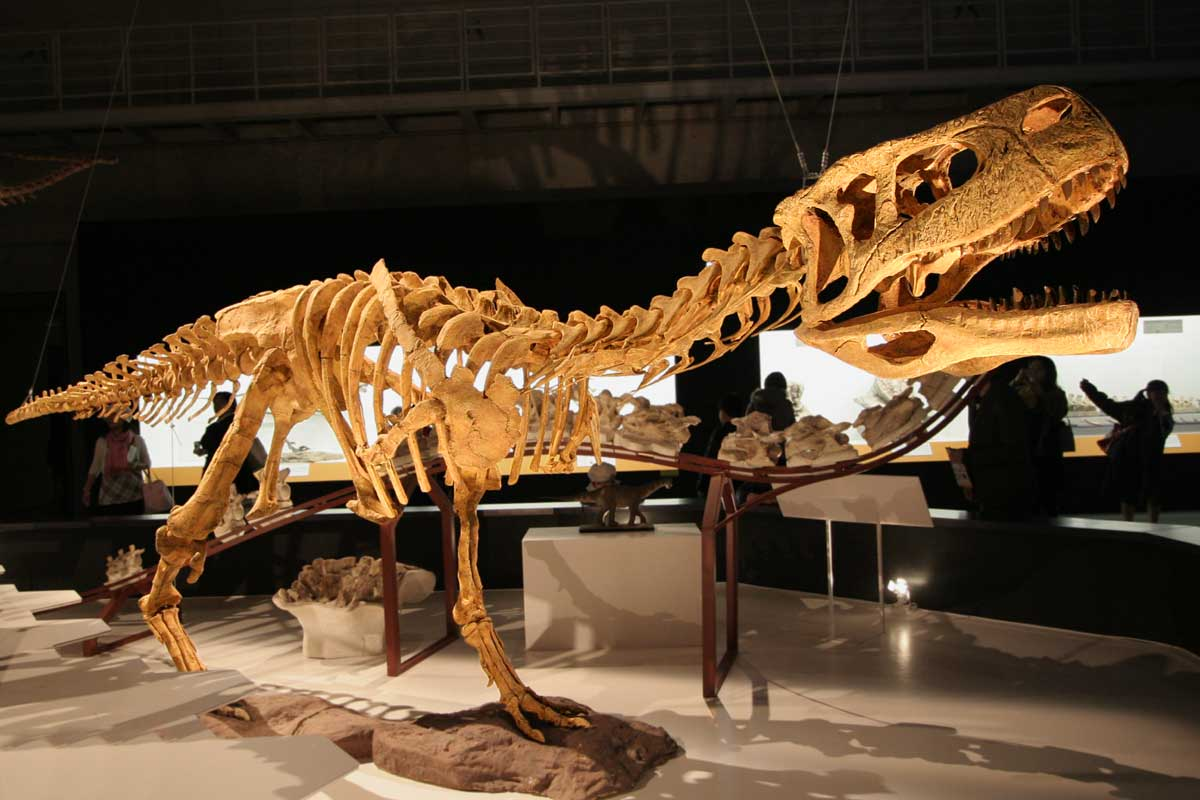
- Mounted skeleton reconstruction

Scientific classification
- Kingdom: Animalia
- Phylum: Chordata
- Class: Reptilia
- Clade: Dinosauria
- Clade: Saurischia
- Clade: Theropoda
- Family: †Abelisauridae
- Tribe: †Carnotaurini
- Genus: †Aucasaurus; Coria et al., 2002

Type species
- †Aucasaurus garridoi Coria et al., 2002

Synonyms
- Abelisaurus garridoi (Coria et al., 2002) Paul, 2010

= Aucasaurus =

Aucasaurus Temporal range: Santonian-Campanian ~85–80 Ma

Extinct genus of dinosaurs

Aucasaurus (meaning 'Auca Mahuevo lizard') is a genus of medium-sized abelisaurid theropod dinosaur from Argentina that lived during the Late Cretaceous (Santonian to Campanian stage) of the Anacleto Formation. It was smaller than the related Carnotaurus, although more derived in some ways, such as its extremely reduced arms and almost total lack of fingers. The type skeleton is complete to the thirteenth caudal vertebra, and so is relatively well understood, and was the most complete abelisaurid known when described in 2002. However, the skull is damaged, causing some paleontologists to speculate that it was involved in a fight prior to death.

== Discovery ==
The holotype of Aucasaurus is known from finds in the Río Colorado Subgroup, a Late Cretaceous group comprising the Anacleto Formation in the Neuquén Basin of Argentina that has yielded many dinosaur fossils. Numerous sauropod eggs are also known from this deposit. The type specimen belongs to a mature individual of at least eleven years old.

== Description ==
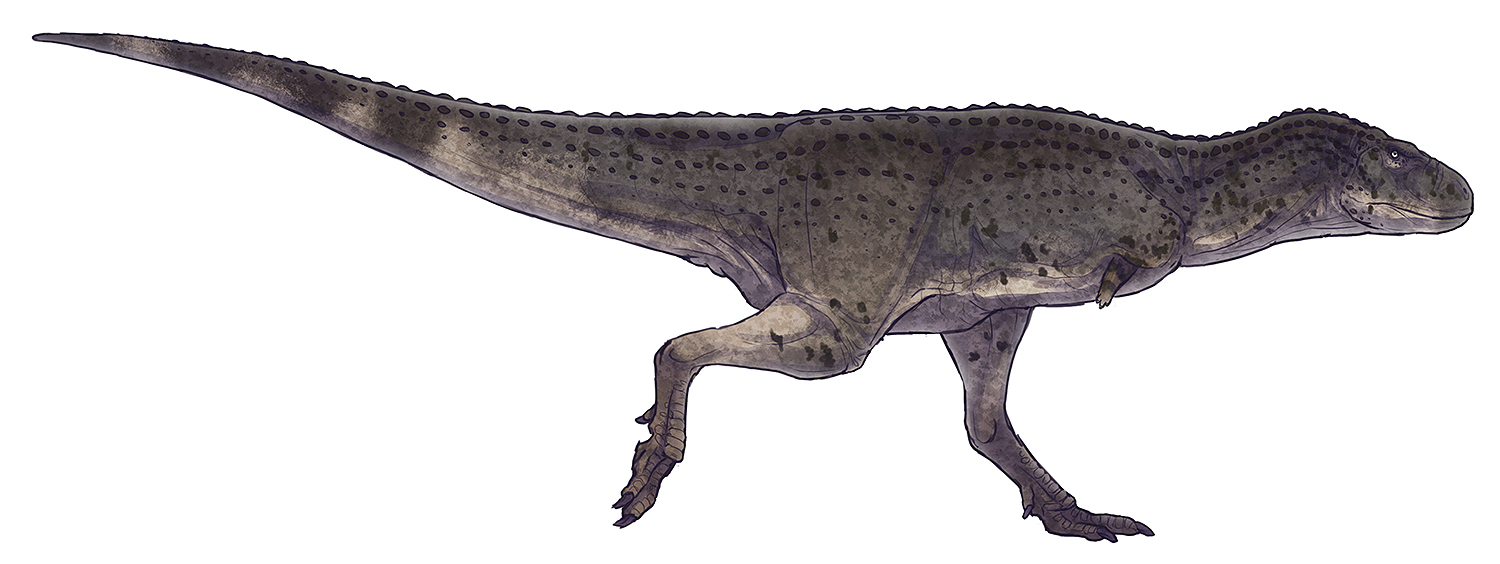
Reconstruction

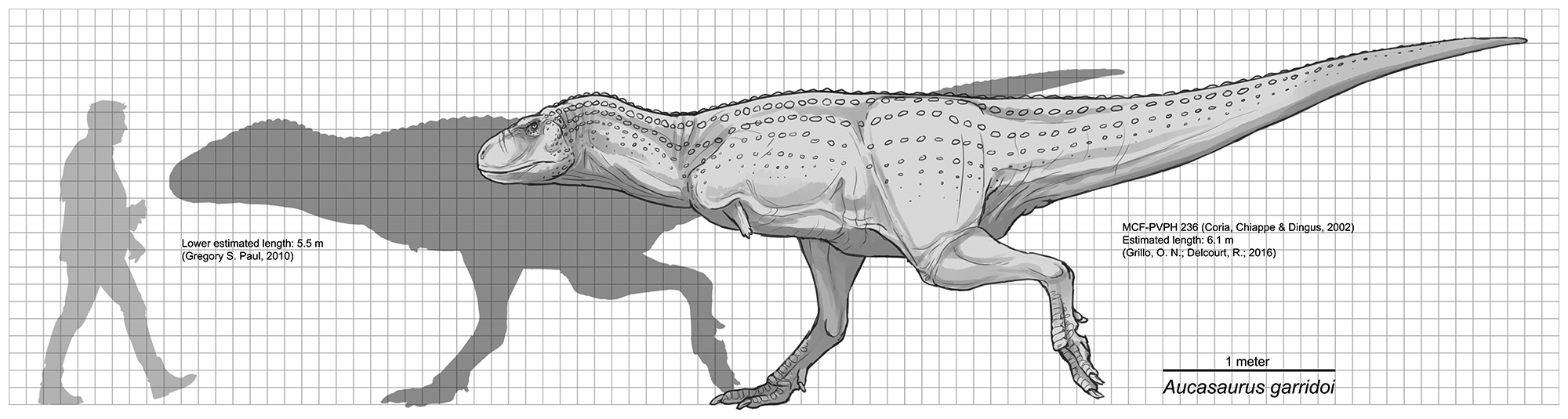
Size compared to a human

Aucasaurus was a medium-sized abelisaur, measuring 5.5–6.2 m (18–20 ft) long and weighing approximately 700 kg (1,500 lb). Its skull was not as short or as deep-snouted as that of Carnotaurus. Also, instead of horns, it had a pair of low ridges above each eye.

=== Postcranial skeleton ===
The small arms of Aucasaurus were also like that of its horned relative, but were proportionally longer due to its small size, and the bones lacked the bony processes and some unusual proportions present in Carnotaurus. The hand of Aucasaurus was unusual: four metacarpals were present, but the first and fourth lacked fingers. The second and third had fingers, but they were quite short and had no claws. Traits found in the caudal vertebrae suggests a significant caudal musculature and rigidity, possibly indicating that it could have been a fast runner.

=== Braincase ===
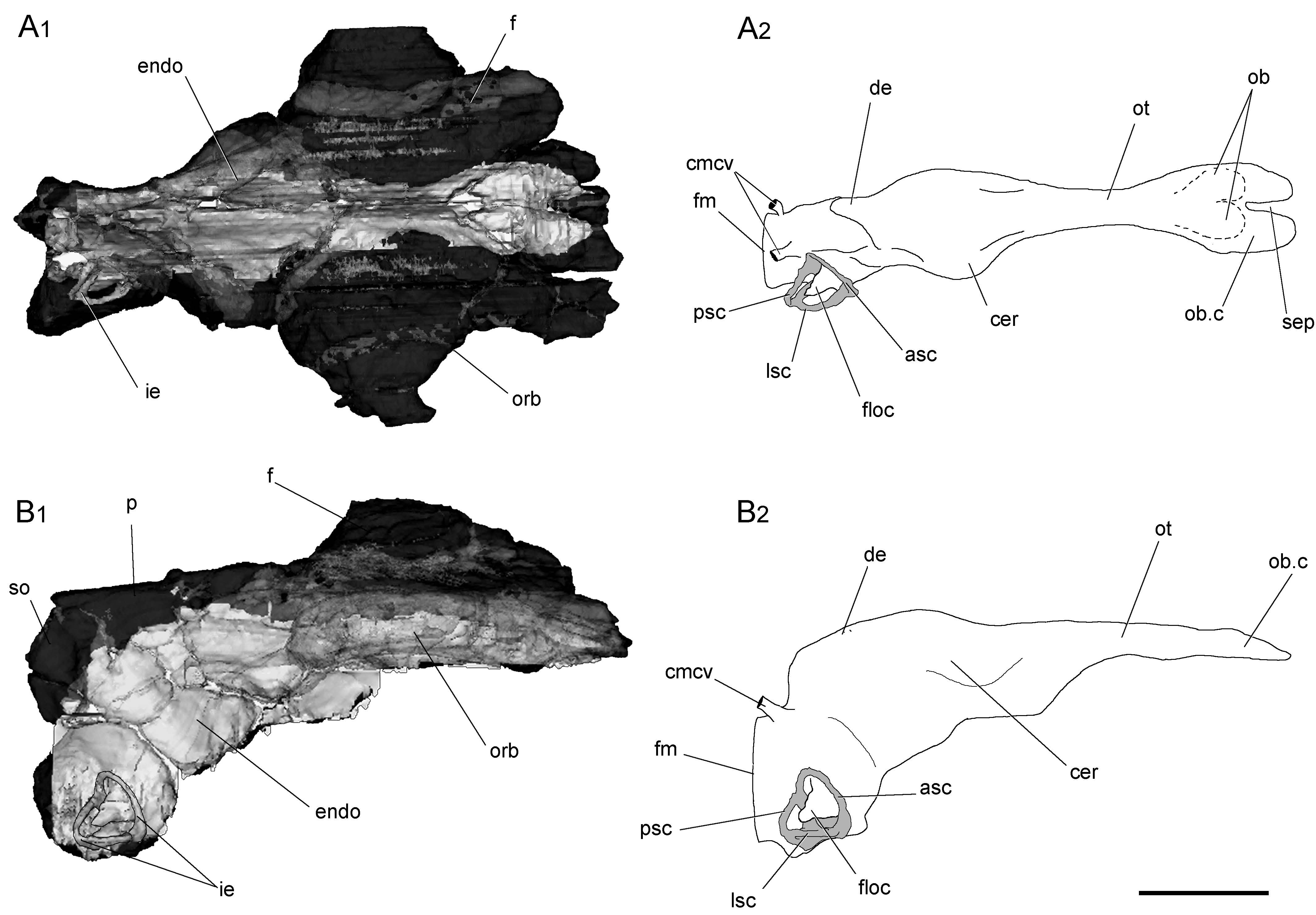
3D scan of the braincase

A study was done on the braincase of Aucasaurus in 2015 by Ariana Paulina-Carabajal and Cecilia Succar, in which the skull material was scanned using a medical CT machine. Virtual three-dimensional inner ear and cranial endocasts were obtained and visualized using the imagine software at the University of Alberta. A latex cranial endocast was also made. The forebrain, midbrain, and hindbrain resemble the morphology described for the abelisaurids Majungasaurus and Indosaurus. However, Aucasaurus exhibits a floccular process that is relatively larger than that of Majungasaurus. In Aucasaurus the flocculus is enclosed in an 8-shaped floccular recess, similar in shape and size to that observed in Abelisaurus, suggesting that the two Patagonian taxa were capable of a slightly wider range of movements of the head. The labyrinth of the inner ear is similar in shape and size to the semicircular canals of Majungasaurus, although the lateral semicircular canal is shorter in Aucasaurus.

=== Pathology ===
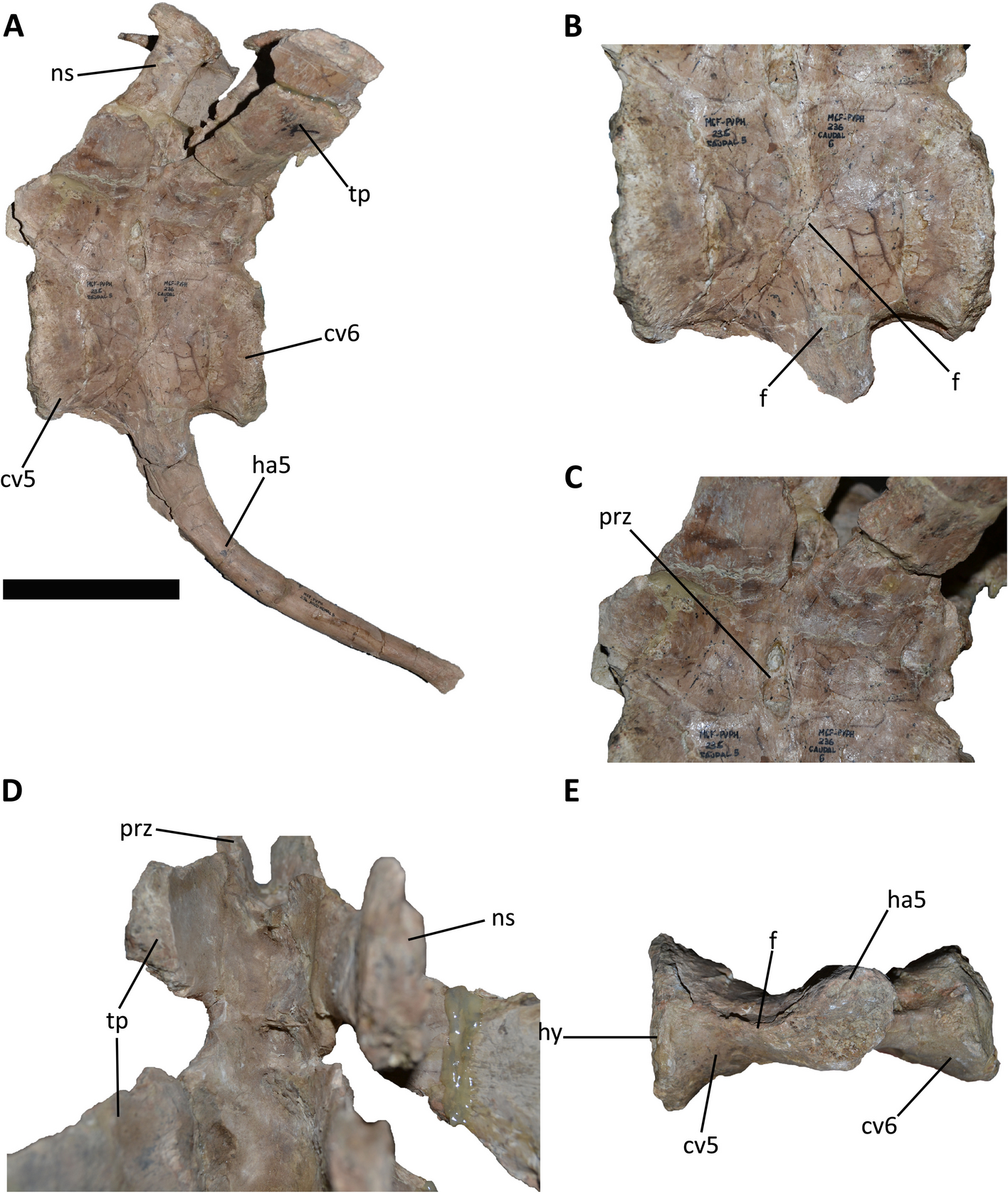
Pathologic fused tail vertebrae

The 5th and 6th holotype tail vertebrae of Aucasaurus provide evidence of failed developmental vertebral segmentation, so two of the vertebrae are fused. Baiano et al. (2024) interpret this as a congenital disorder (birth defect) called block vertebrae. This represents the earliest known occurrence of this pathology in the non-avian theropod fossil record.

== Classification ==
In 2009, Novas suggested that Aucasaurus garridoi might be a junior synonym of Abelisaurus comahuensis. In 2010, Gregory S. Paul renamed Aucasaurus garridoi into Abelisaurus garridoi. Despite their similarities, other researchers have placed both genera as separate genera, and subsequent studies suggest that Aucasaurus was more closely related to other taxa such as Carnotaurus, with some including them in the Carnotaurini.

Below is a cladogram by Canalle et al. in 2009.

- Carnotaurinae
  - Majungasaurus
  - Brachyrostra
    - Carnotaurini
      - Aucasaurus
      - Carnotaurus
    - - Ilokelesia
      - - Skorpiovenator
        - Ekrixinatosaurus

== See also ==
- Timeline of ceratosaur research
