= Ilokelesia =

Ilokelesia Temporal range: Early Cretaceous (Albian), 106.2 Ma
- Ilokelesia

Scientific classification
- Kingdom: Animalia
- Phylum: Chordata
- Class: Reptilia
- Clade: Dinosauria
- Clade: Saurischia
- Clade: Theropoda
- Family: †Abelisauridae
- Genus: †Ilokelesia; Coria & Salgado, 1998
- Species: †I. aguadagrandensis

Binomial name
- †Ilokelesia aguadagrandensis Coria & Salgado, 1998

Genus of abelisaurid dinosaurs

Ilokelesia is an extinct genus of abelisaurid theropod dinosaurs, preserved in layers of the Early Cretaceous (Albian) Huincul Formation (Neuquén Group) in Neuquén Province, Argentina. The only known specimen, consisting of fragmentary elements of the skull and skeleton, was described by Rodolfo Coria and Leonardo Salgado in late 1998.

== Discovery and naming ==
Ilokelesia is only known from very fragmentary elements of the skull and the axial and appendicular skeleton, discovered in 1991. It was discovered ten meters away from where the holotype of Huinculsaurus was discovered. The genus was named and described in 1998.

The generic name is derived from the Mapuche language, ilo meaning "flesh" and kelesio, "lizard"; while the specific name reflects the name of the locality where the fossil was found, Aguada Grande.

== Description ==
Ilokelesia was a medium-sized theropod. In 2010 Gregory S. Paul gave a length of 4 meters (13 ft) and a weight of 200 kg (440 lbs). In 2016 it was estimated to be 5.3 metres (17 ft) in length in a comprehensive analysis of abelisaur size. The same year another estimation listed it higher at 5.8 meters (19 ft) and 840 kg (1,850 lbs). It is characterized by features of the skull, namely of the quadrate and postorbital bones. The vertebral series also has distinctive characters setting it apart from other abelisaurs, such as reduced processes on the cervical vertebrae and dorsal vertebrae lacking pleurocoels.

Ilokelesia was considered the most basal abelisaur described at the time, sharing characters, such as an expansion of the postorbital bone above the orbit and a flange of the same bone inside the orbit, with Abelisauridae and Noasauridae; but it was considered to retain primitive features for Abelisauria, such as an opening in the quadrate bone and a T-shaped postorbital. A subsequent analysis has placed it within Abelisauridae, as a brachyrostran carnotaurine.

== See also ==
- Timeline of ceratosaur research
