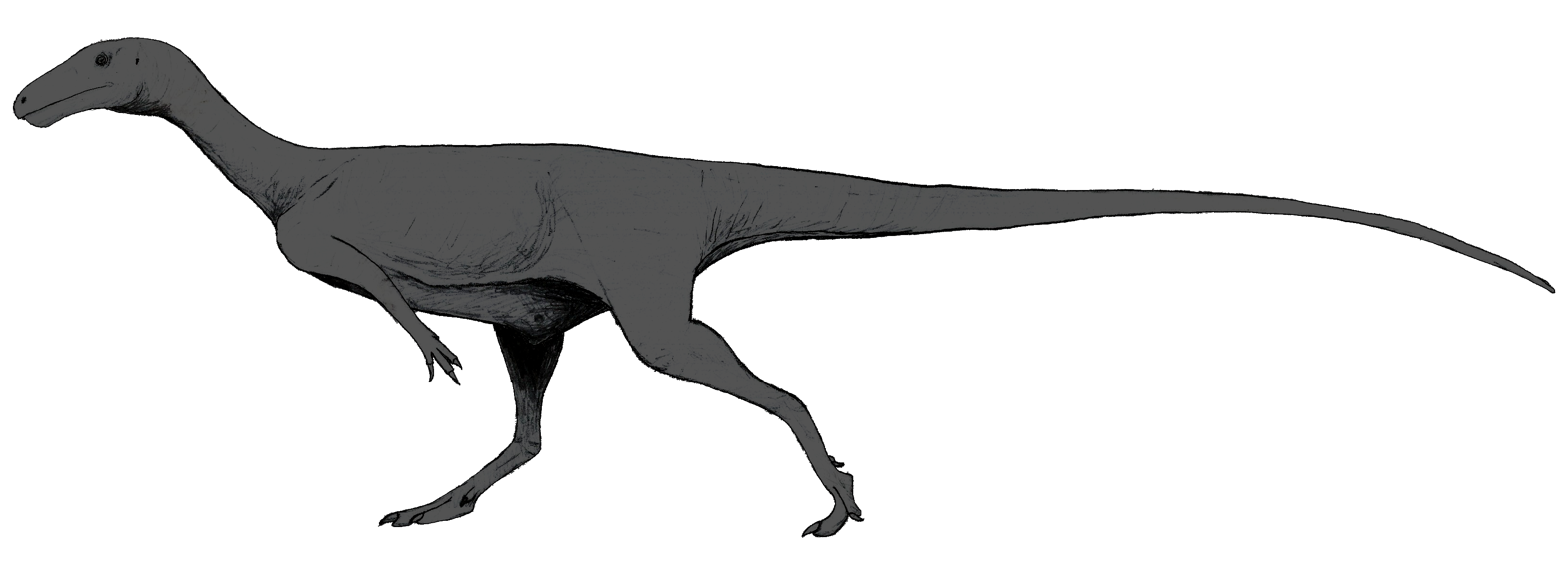
- Speculative life restoration

Scientific classification
- Kingdom: Animalia
- Phylum: Chordata
- Class: Reptilia
- Clade: Dinosauria
- Clade: Saurischia
- Clade: Theropoda
- Family: †Noasauridae
- Genus: †Afromimus; Sereno, 2017

Type species
- Afromimus tenerensis Sereno, 2017

= Afromimus =

Afromimus Temporal range: Aptian-Albian, 112 Ma

Extinct genus of dinosaurs

Afromimus (meaning "Africa mimic") is a genus of ceratosaurian theropod dinosaur from the Early Cretaceous Elrhaz Formation of Niger. It contains a single species, A. tenerensis, named in 2017 by Paul Sereno from parts of the right leg, vertebrae, and ribs found in the Ténéré Desert. It was originally described as a genus of ornithomimosaurian, but subsequent arguments have placed it as a taxon within or close to the superfamily Abelisauroidea.

== Discovery and naming ==
The only known specimen of Afromimus is a partial skeleton consisting of seven tail vertebrae (originating from the middle of the tail and estimated to be the 15th, 16th, 18th, 20th, 22nd, 24th, and 27th tail vertebrae), bones from the right hindlimb (the tibia, fibula, tarsal bones, and phalanges), and part of a rib, all found within a radius of 1 m (3.3 ft). It was discovered in 1997 at the Gadoufaoua locality in the Elrhaz Formation, in the Ténéré Desert of Niger. The specimen is catalogued as MNBH GAD112 in the Musée National Boubou Hama, the national museum of Niger in the city of Niamey. Since the specimen was exposed to the elements when it was found, it may have been more complete when it was still buried. The hindlimb elements were discovered in place, although they were weathered; the tail vertebrae were out of place, and the last vertebra in the sequence was found several meters away from the rest of the specimen.

In 2017, Paul Sereno published a description of MNBH GAD112 as the holotype specimen of a new genus and species, Afromimus tenerensis. The genus name combines the Latin prefix Afro- ("Africa") and the Greek word mimos ("mimic"), in reference to the interpretation of the specimen as a member of the Ornithomimosauria. The species name combines the name of the Ténéré Desert and the Latin suffix -ensis ("from"). Subsequently, in 2019, Mauricio Cerroni and colleagues published a reassessment of Afromimus as a member of the Abelisauroidea.

== Description ==
Afromimus was initially described as "medium-sized" for an ornithomimosaur. Judging by the fusion in the vertebrae and between the fibula and tarsus of the holotype specimen of Afromimus, the individual had reached adult size before it died. The tibia has a length of 40 cm (16 in). Sereno noted that the largest specimen of the ornithomimosaur Sinornithomimus (a subadult at least seven years old) had a tibia of a similar length, and concluded that Afromimus had a somewhat smaller adult size, making it half the size of Gallimimus, twice the size of Shenzhousaurus, and three times the size of Nqwebasaurus. Based on the tibia length and subsequent noasaurid interpretation, Afromimus is estimated to have been 4.14 metres (13.6 ft) long.

=== Tail vertebrae ===
Sereno identified several distinctive characteristics in the tail vertebrae of Afromimus. The 16th tail vertebra had depressions along the top and bottom surfaces of the broad centrum, which Sereno described as "peanut-shaped". Such a structure would have stabilized the tail from flexing to the side. The depressions on the bottom surfaces are less evident towards the rear of the tail. This trait is shared with Gallimimus and an unnamed ornithomimid from the Dinosaur Park Formation, and contrasts with the less-broad centra of the abelisauroids Majungasaurus and Masiakasaurus; however, among the Abelisauroidea, the noasaurid Elaphrosaurus also has similar vertebrae.

Additionally, the prezygapophyses and postzygapophyses (articular processes at the front and rear of the vertebrae that interlock with adjacent vertebrae) are distinctive. The sides of the prezygapophyses have a rough texture, which Sereno considered to be an autapomorphy, or distinguishing trait; however, these rough surfaces are also seen in the abelisauroids Majungasaurus, Ceratosaurus, and Ekrixinatosaurus, and Cerroni and colleagues suggested that this trait may be more widespread as indications of muscle or ligament attachments. The sides of the postzygapophyses are rough as well. The facets where the prezygapophyses interlock are also distinctive — a rounded corner on the outer surface of the postzygapophysis fit into an oval facet on the inner surface of the prezygapophysis, and the tip of the postzygapophysis fit into a rimmed depression on the prezygapophysis which was situated closer to the centrum. The purpose of these structures was likely to stiffen the tail. Sereno noted that the latter trait is shared with Sinornithomimus and more advanced ornithomimids, but the same is also present in Majungasaurus, Masiakasaurus, and several Indian abelisauroids.

Several processes on the tail vertebrae of Afromimus are present as low crests or ridges, including the neural spine and transverse process, although the transverse processes become smooth by the 27th tail vertebra. Below the transverse processes, the 16th tail vertebra also has an accessory ridge, accompanied by a depression below it; the depression also becomes smooth by the 27th tail vertebra. On the bottom of the vertebra, there is a pair of prominent, roughened ridges where the chevrons attach.

The pedicels, or surfaces where the chevrons articulate with their corresponding vertebrae, are fused into a continuous, crescent-shaped surface in Afromimus. Sereno considered as an autapomorphy the fact that the fused surface was half as wide front-to-back than it was side-to-side, although Ceratosaurus, Majungasaurus, and Masiakasaurus also have the same condition. Despite this, Cerroni and colleagues noted a potential distinguishing trait in that the rearward-projecting (posterior) process of the chevron is much larger than the forward-projecting (anterior) process, which is not seen in any ornithomimosaurs or abelisauroids.

=== Hindlimbs ===
At the top end of the tibia, Sereno noted an unusual elliptical attachment scar bearing a series of roughened ridges, located below the expanded lateral condyle on the outer surface of the bone. Most ornithomimosaurs lack this scar, but it is present in the abelisauroids Masiakasaurus, Ekrixinatosaurus, Skorpiovenator, and Carnotaurus, as well as to a lesser extent in Velocisaurus and Ceratosaurus. Just to the front of the scar is the fibular crest, which is shorter and narrower than those of Sinornithomimus and Gallimimus and also becomes deeper at its bottom end. This crest stretches to the top of the bone, which is typical of abelisauroids but is unusual for ornithomimosaurs and other tetanuran theropods, where it is separated by a notch from the top. Like the two ornithomimosaurs, however, the bottom edge of the lateral condyle is clearly demarcated from the shaft of the bone.

The shaft of the tibia is compressed at the front and rear, and bows outwards, unlike the relatively straight shafts of the ornithomimosaurs Sinornithomimus, Gallimimus, and Beishanlong, and the noasaurid Elaphrosaurus, but like the noasaurids Masiakasaurus and Velocisaurus. The bottom end of the tibia expands outwards to form the lateral malleolus, which is one-third the width of the bottom end and is partially fused to the astragalus (one of the tarsal bones). This partial fusion is unknown in ornithomimosaurs, but it is present in Ceratosaurus, noasaurids, and the Alvarezsauroidea. The actual articulating surface of the astragalus on the tibia is roughened and bears a raised lip, the medial buttress, at its inner rim, which is unknown in ornithomimosaurs but is present in Ceratosaurus and various abelisauroids. The inner edge of the astragalus is offset from the buttress, which is similar to Nqwebasaurus. Compared to ornithomimosaurs, the articulating surface for an ascending process of the astragalus on the tibia is much smaller and lower. Accordingly, Afromimus had a small, subrectangular ascending process on the astragalus like those of abelisauroids, but unlike Sinornithomimus, Gallimimus, and Harpymimus. The calcaneum (another tarsal bone) is also more exposed in Afromimus.

Unlike Sinornithomimus and Gallimimus, the fibular crest on the tibia does not join with the iliofibular tubercle or anterior trochanter (the attachment of the iliofibularis muscle) on front of the fibula, because the anterior tubercle is situated further towards the rear by about 2 cm (0.79 in). The tubercle is roughened and better developed than in ornithomimosaurs, although a well-developed tubercle is typical of Ceratosaurus and various abelisauroids. On the inner side of the fibula, there is a deep fossa that extends smoothly onto the shaft in the form of a trough running in front of the anterior tubercle. The fossa is covered partially by the flared tibial crest, and it is also demarcated above by a crest angled upwards at the rear. There is also a roughened attachment surface below the tibial crest (considered by Sereno to be an autapomorphy). These characteristics are similar to Ceratosaurus, Masiakasaurus, Skorpiovenator, Arcovenator, and Deltadromeus. Some tetanurans, like Tyrannosaurus, Neovenator, and Beishanlong, also have the deep fossa, but lack the surrounding crests. Nevertheless, Cerroni and colleagues noted that the tibial crest covers the fibial fossa to a much greater extent than Masiakasaurus, which is an autapomorphy. The bottom end of the fibula in Afromimus is relatively expanded for an ornithomimosaur, but it resembles Masiakasaurus, Skorpiovenator, and Xenotarsosaurus in this respect.

The foot claws of Afromimus show characteristics shared between abelisauroids and ornithomimosaurs. The bottom surfaces of the claws are relatively flat, which is the case for most ornithomimosaurs (except for Beishanlong and Deinocheirus) and noasaurids. There are two grooves for the attachment of a keratin sheath on the side of the claw, one near the top and one near the bottom, which is common to some noasaurids; however, many ornithomimosaurs only have the groove on the bottom. On the bottom of the claw, there is a V-shaped platform for the attachment of the sheath, with a deep pit in between. Sereno inferred that the sheath would have been a subtriangular "hoof" in life. The inner edge of the platform is a sharp ridge while the outer edge is rounded. Some noasaurids have a similar platform. The attachment for the flexor muscle at the rear of the claw is also recessed, which is seen in ornithomimosaurs.

== Classification ==
Despite various characteristics shared with abelisauroids, Sereno assigned Afromimus to the Ornithomimosauria in 2017. To support this position, he stated that the "peanut-shaped" centra and the rimmed depressions on the prezygapophyses in the tail vertebrae have been reported in Sinornithomimus, Gallimimus, and other ornithomimosaurs (Deinocheirus also has broad centra, although it lacks the prezygapophyseal depressions), while the shape of the centra contrasts with the subcircular centra in Majungasaurus, Masiakasaurus, and alvarezsauroids.

He also drew attention to characteristics of the foot claws, namely the flat bottom face with a V-shaped platform and the recessed flexor attachment, which are shared with ornithomimosaurs. While he noted that the first two traits are shared with abelisauroids, as well as the additional sheath attachment groove near the top of the claw, he noted that the latter condition was not consistent among abelisauroids: the grooves in abelisauroids usually reach the tip of the claw, while they dissipate beforehand in Afromimus, and an unnamed noasaurid also from the Elrhaz Formation. Sereno also noted that the expansion of the fibula's bottom end resembles Masiakasaurus, but not the unnamed noasaurid.

Within the Ornithomimosauria, Sereno did not provide a concrete position for Afromimus other than noting it was a basal (early-diverging) member. He noted that the prezygapophyses were relatively short compared to Harpymimus and Shenzhousaurus, and that the ascending process of the astragalus is much less extensive in both Afromimus and Nqwebasaurus compared to most other ornithomimosaurs. Sereno concluded that the affinities of Afromimus "will likely be tested most effectively by discovery of new material".

In their 2019 paper, Cerroni and colleagues systematically analyzed the traits that Sereno noted as being shared between Afromimus and ornithomimosaurs, and concluded that many of the same traits can also be found among abelisauroids (see §Description for further discussion of the analysis). In particular, Afromimus shares with abelisauroids:

- Tail vertebrae with depressions in the prezygapophyses
- Chevrons with fused pedicels which are short front-to-back
- A fibular crest on the tibia continuous with the top end
- A prominent iliofibular tubercle on the fibula
- A subrectangular ascending process of the astragalus fused to the fibula
- Foot claws with a recessed flexor attachment (i.e. lacking a flexor tubercle)
- Foot claws with two grooves and a bump on the side

To rigorously test the affinities of Afromimus, they added it to three phylogenetic datasets: two generally encompassing theropods, from Carrano et al. (2012) and Choiniere et al. (2012); and one focusing specifically on the Ceratosauria, from Brissón Egli et al. (2016). The most parsimonious phylogenetic trees for the first two analyses found Afromimus to be a member of the Ceratosauria, grouping with Masiakasaurus and Majungasaurus in the former and with Masiakasaurus in the latter. Forcing Afromimus to be an ornithomimosaur resulted in a less parsimonious tree for the latter analysis. Finally, adding Afromimus to the ceratosaur-centric matrix resulted in it being found as part of the Noasauridae in a polytomy (unresolved group). In this analysis, the inclusion of Afromimus in the Ceratosauria is supported by the prominent iliofibular tubercle; its inclusion in the Noasauridae is supported by the flattened bottom end of the tibia and the fusion of the astragalar ascending process to the fibula. Given these results, Cerroni and colleagues referred Afromimus to the Abelisauroidea, with a likely position in the Noasauridae. However, they maintained it as a valid taxon because of the large posterior process of the chevron and the extent to which the tibial crest of the fibula covers the fibular fossa. The phylogenetic tree from the analysis is partially replicated below.

- - Berberosaurus
  - Deltadromeus
  - - - Spinostropheus
      - - Elaphrosaurus
        - Limusaurus
    - - - Ceratosaurus
        - Genyodectes
      - - Eoabelisaurus
        - Noasauridae
          - Laevisuchus
          - Masiakasaurus
          - Noasaurus
          - Velocisaurus
          - Afromimus
        - Abelisauridae

In their 2024 redescription of the abelisauroid Noasaurus, Hendrickx et al. noted the disputed affinities of Afromimus. Still, they recovered it in a clade also including Berthasaura and Austrocheirus in their phylogenetic analysis, which they named Berthasauridae. They found berthasaurids to nest outside of the Noasauridae, as the sister taxon to abelisauroids. Their results are displayed in the cladogram below:

- Ceratosauria
  - Kryptops (postcranium)
  - - Elaphrosaurinae
    - Neoceratosauria
      - Ceratosauridae
      - - Berberosaurus
        - - Eoabelisaurus
          - - Ligabueino
            - - Berthasauridae
                - Berthasaura
                - Afromimus
                - Austrocheirus
              - Abelisauroidea
                - Noasauridae
                - Abelisauridae

=== Evolution of ornithomimosaurs ===
In 2014, Ronan Allain and colleagues suggested that the close relation of the African Nqwebasaurus to Eurasian basal ornithomimosaurs indicates that the group was widespread before the breakup of Pangaea. In his description of Afromimus, Sereno suggested that southern ornithomimosaurs such as Afromimus and Nqwebasaurus, which he labelled as the only unambiguous ornithomimosaurs from the southern hemisphere, were an early phase in the group's evolution. However, the removal of Afromimus from the Ornithomimosauria by Cerroni and colleagues weakens this hypothesis, as do several analyses excluding Nqwebasaurus from the Ornithomimosauria; they considered the presence of ornithomimosaurs in the southern hemisphere to be equivocal.

== Paleoecology ==
No other fossil vertebrates were found with the remains of Afromimus at the Gadoufaoua locality. However, other dinosaurs are known from Gaoufaoua: the theropods Suchomimus/Cristatusaurus, Kryptops, and Eocarcharia; the sauropod Nigersaurus; and the ornithopods Ouranosaurus, Lurdusaurus, and Elrhazosaurus. Other fauna include crocodilians, such as Sarcosuchus, Stolokrosuchus, Araripesuchus, and Anatosuchus; turtles of the genera Teneremys, Platycheloides, Taquetochelys, and Araripemys; and fish, including the coelacanth Mawsonia, the lungfish Ceratodus, and the ray-finned fish Lepidotes and Pliodetes.

== See also ==
- Timeline of ornithomimosaur research
- Timeline of ceratosaur research
- 2017 in archosaur paleontology
