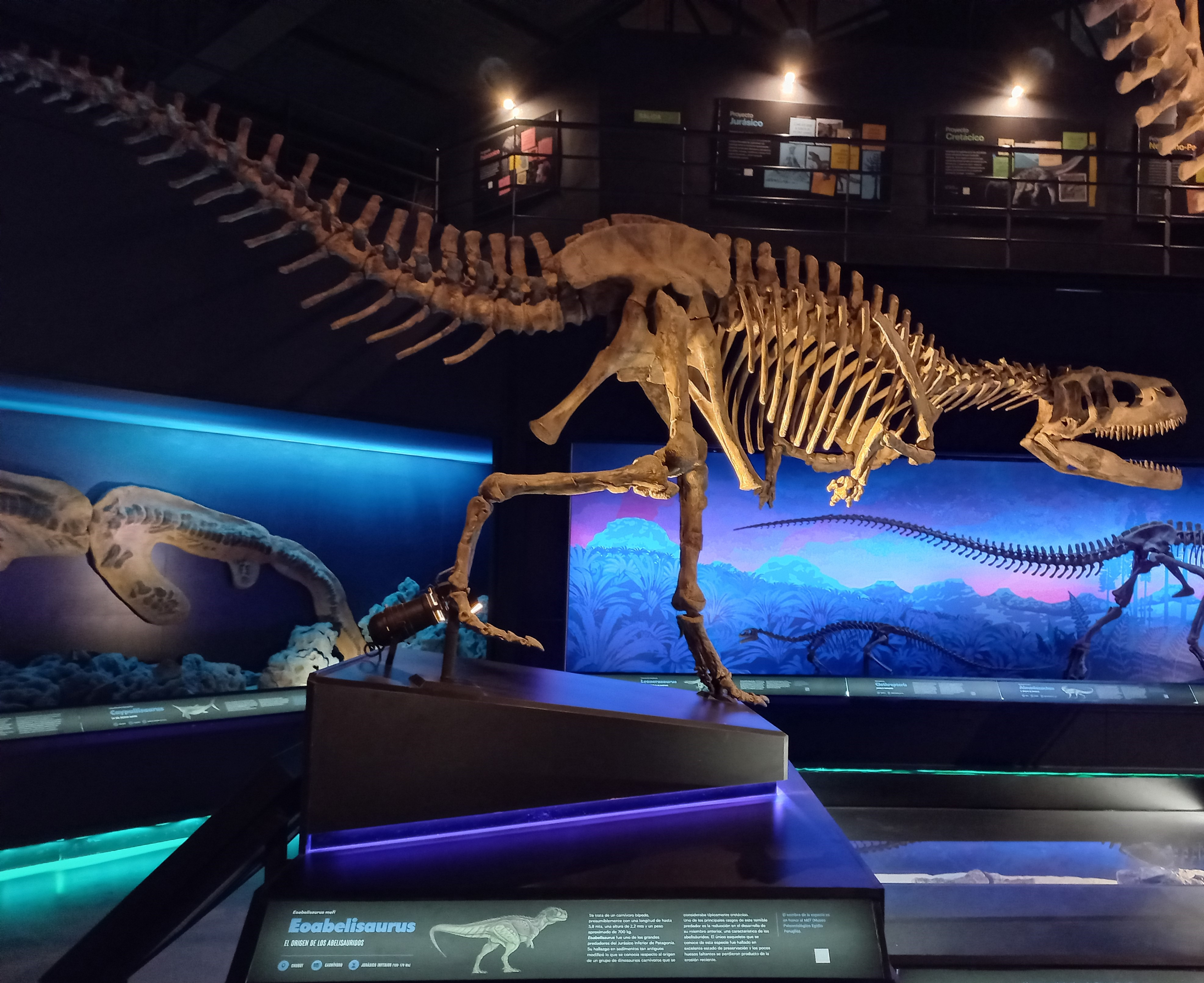
- Reconstructed skeleton

Scientific classification
- Kingdom: Animalia
- Phylum: Chordata
- Class: Reptilia
- Clade: Dinosauria
- Clade: Saurischia
- Clade: Theropoda
- Superfamily: †Abelisauroidea
- Genus: †Eoabelisaurus; Pol & Rauhut, 2012

Type species
- †Eoabelisaurus mefi Pol & Rauhut, 2012

= Eoabelisaurus =

Eoabelisaurus Temporal range: Early Jurassic (middle Toarcian), ~179.17–178.07 Ma

Extinct genus of dinosaurs

Eoabelisaurus (/ˈioʊəˌbɛlɪˈsɔːrəs/) is a genus of abelisauroid theropod dinosaur from the Lower Jurassic Cañadón Asfalto Formation of the Cañadón Asfalto Basin in Argentina, South America. The generic name combines a Greek ἠώς, (eos), "dawn", with the name Abelisaurus, in reference to the fact it represents an early relative of the latter. Only one species is currently recognized, E. mefi; the specific name honours the MEF, the Museo Paleontológico "Egidio Feruglio", where discoverer Diego Pol is active. It is characterized by reduced forelimb proportions that show primitive characteristics of the Abelisauridae family.

== Discovery and naming ==
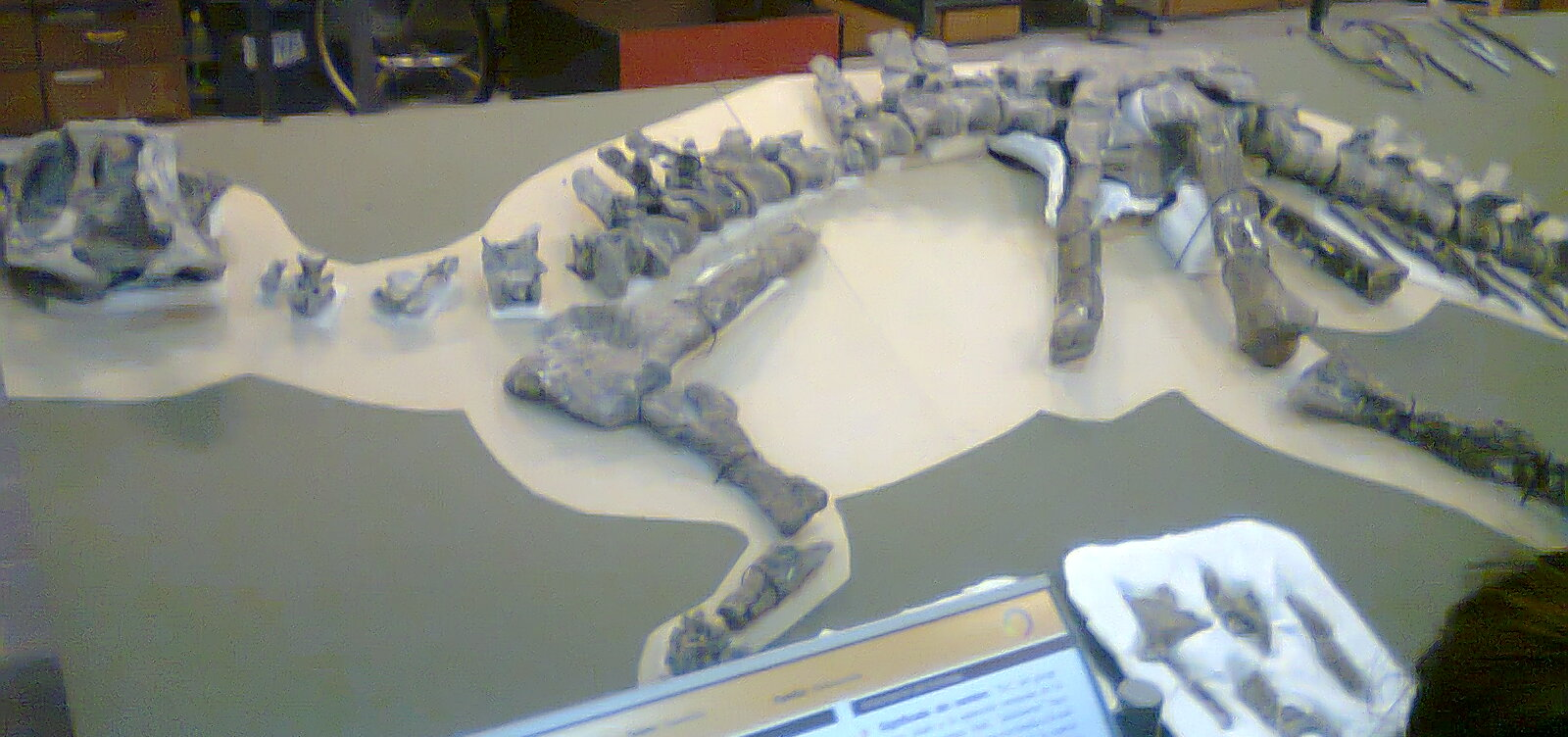
Holotype fossil, Museo Paleontológico Egidio Feruglio

In 2009, Argentinian paleontologist Diego Pol discovered the skeleton of a theropod near the village of Cerro Cóndor in Chubut Province. The remains were found in the Jugo Loco locality that is placed in a series of fine beds of mudstone, marlstone, and limestone in the Cañadón Asfalto Formation. In 2012, based on these remains, the type species Eoabelisaurus mefi was named and described by Pol and his German colleague Oliver Rauhut.

Before discovery, the oldest known abelisaurids were represented only by fragmentary remains from the late Early Cretaceous of South America and Africa and older records of abelisauroids in general were questionable. With the discovery of Eoabelisaurus, the temporal range of the clade was extended for more than 40 million years into the Toarcian. The existence of a derived ceratosaur at that time indicated a rapid diversification of ceratosaurs during that time period, as all the major ceratosaurian lineages (ceratosaurids, noasaurids, and abelisaurids) had already been established.

== Description ==
Size comparison

It was a bipedal carnivore that was estimated to have reached 6–6.5 metres (19.7–21.3 ft) in length, although a comprehensive analysis of abelisaur size conducted in 2016 yielded a size estimate of 5.8 metres (19 ft). It is estimated to have weighed up to 730–800 kilograms (1,610–1,760 lb). The holotype specimen, MPEF PV 3990, was uncovered in a layer of the Cañadón Asfalto Formation, a lacustrine deposit dating originally from the Aalenian-Bajocian, roughly 170 million years old, yet a recent advanced zircon datation constrained its age to the Middle-Late Toarcian (179-178 million years). It consists of a nearly complete skeleton with skull, of a subadult or adult individual.

The posterior half of the skeleton was found in articulation and the anterior dorsal and cervical vertebrae and forelimbs were found partially disarticulated prior to burial. The skull was discovered slightly separated from the vertebral column. The skull and anterior presacrals were also exposed at the time of discovery and had been partially been destroyed by erosion. From the material known of the snout, only a small fragment of the right maxilla has been recovered and shows that the interdental plates are fused, but not striated. The known posterior part of the skull is high, with an oval orbit and an enlarged infratemporal fenestra, similar to other ceratosaurs. The skull roof is not notably thickened and no cranial ornamentation is present.

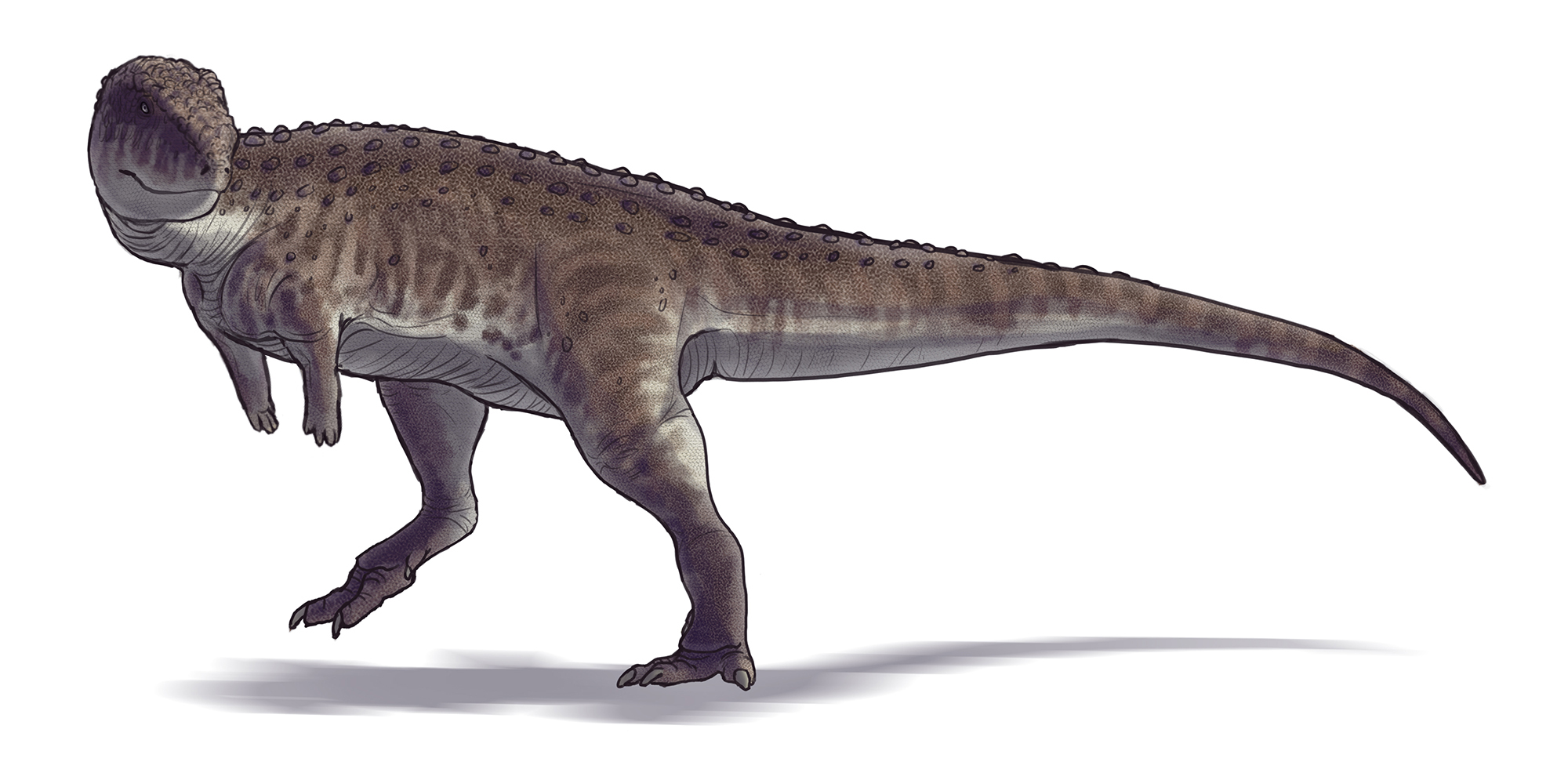
Restoration

Both humeri from the known material are poorly preserved, but show primitive characters. The articular head is slightly rounded, but not a globular shape that is commonly seen in noasaurids and abelisaurids. The radius and ulna are short and the ulna has a large olecranon process. The manus is very foreshortened, retains four digits, and has short metacarpals. Metacarpal I is about half the length of metacarpal II and considerably more slender. The arm also bears a stout phalanx that is slightly longer than the metacarpal. The non-terminal manual phalanges are about as long as wide and lack any constriction between the articular ends, and manual unguals are reduced. It is these reduced limb proportions that demonstrate Eoabelisaurus was indeed a primitive abelisaurid.

The exact number of vertebrae is unknown due to several gaps in the holotype's spine, but its cervical vertebrae are short and have two pneumatic foramina on either side of the centra. The length of vertebral centra remains constant over the preserved portion of the tail, but middle and posterior caudals are considerably lower.

== Classification ==
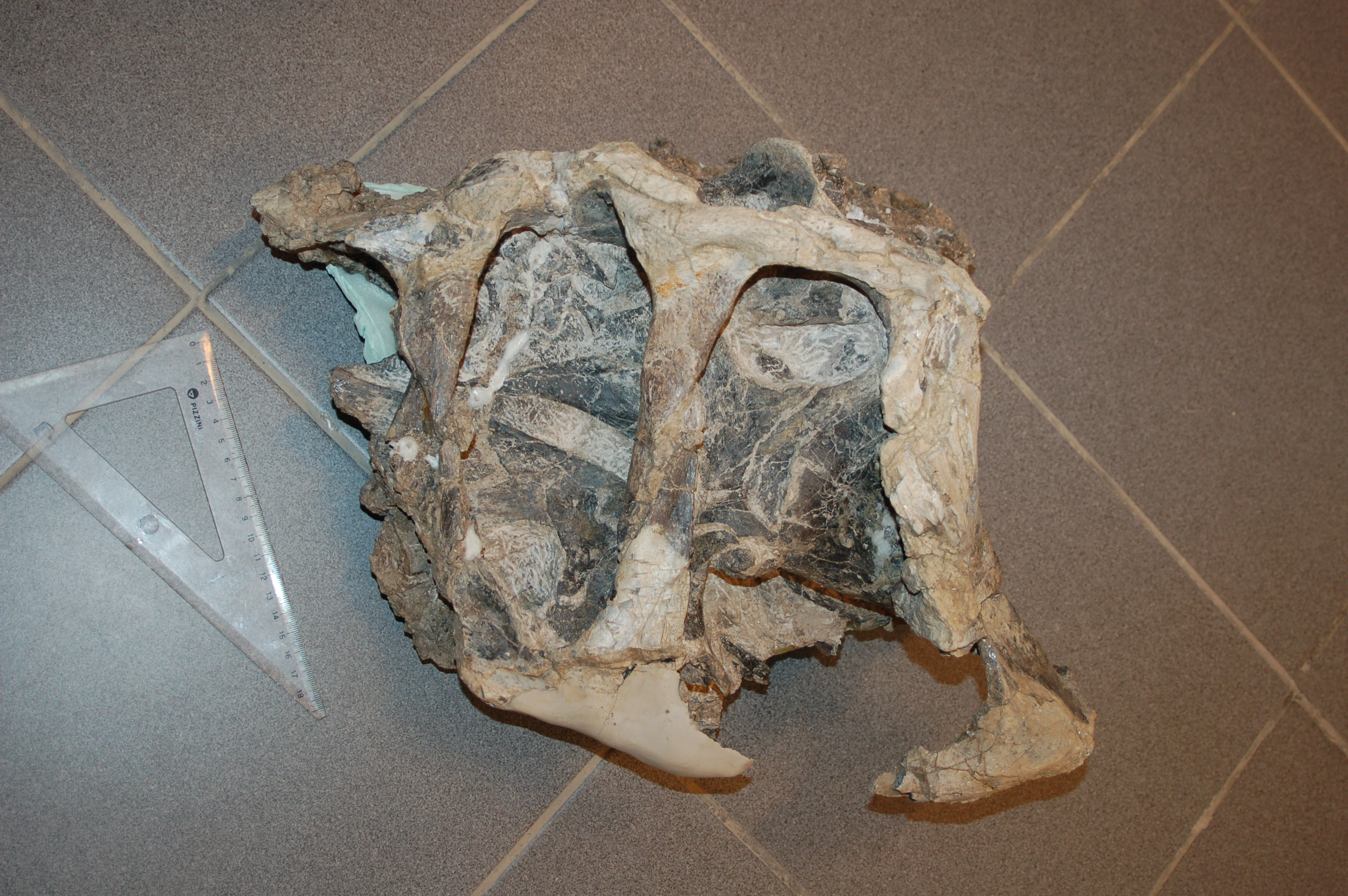
Holotype skull, seen from the left side, with triangle ruler for scale

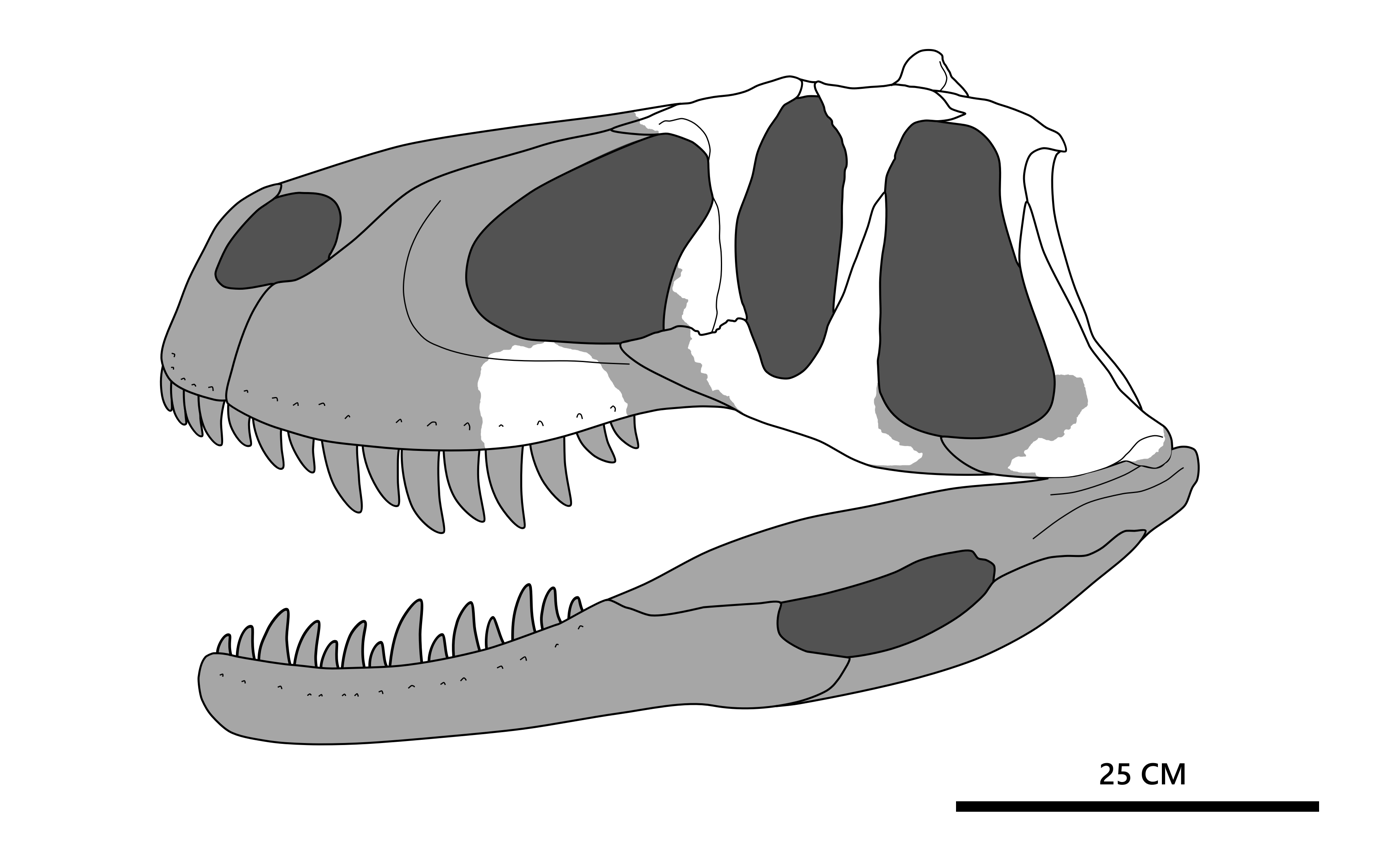
Reconstruction of the holotype skull

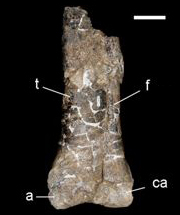
Lower leg bones

Eoabelisaurus was assigned to the basalmost position in Abelisauridae by its describers. It would, then, be the oldest abelisaurid species known by forty (40) million years. The describers indicated that in the cladistic analysis a difference of only a single trait would have resulted in a position lower in the evolutionary tree, basal in the Abelisauroidea. The following cladogram follows their analysis.

- Ceratosauria
  - Berberosaurus
  - Deltadromeus
  - - - Spinostropheus
      - - Limusaurus
        - Elaphrosaurus
    - Neoceratosauria
      - Ceratosauridae
        - Ceratosaurus
        - Genyodectes
      - Abelisauroidea
        - Noasauridae
          - Laevisuchus
          - Masiakasaurus
          - Noasaurus
          - Velocisaurus
        - Abelisauridae
          - Eoabelisaurus
          - - Rugops
            - - Abelisaurus
              - Carnotaurinae
                - - Majungasaurus
                  - Indosaurus
                  - Rajasaurus
                - Brachyrostra
                  - - Ilokelesia
                    - Ekrixinatosaurus
                    - Skorpiovenator
                  - Carnotaurini
                    - Carnotaurus
                    - Aucasaurus

In 2018, Rafael Delcourt placed Eoabelisaurus at the basic position within Ceratosauridae, noting that the topology of this genus is still problematic. The following cladogram demonstrates the relationships of Eoabelisaurus according to latter publication. However, such classification is not well-supported.

- Ceratosauroidea
  - Noasauridae
    - Spinostropheus
    - - Elaphrosaurinae
        - Elaphrosaurus
        - Limusaurus
      - Noasaurinae
        - Deltadromeus
        - Laevisuchus
        - Noasaurus
        - Velocisaurus
        - Masiakasaurus
  - - Berberosaurus
    - Etrigansauria
      - Ceratosauridae
        - Eoabelisaurus
        - - Genyodectes
          - Ceratosaurus
      - Chenanisaurus
      - Abelisauridae
        - Rugops
        - - Abelisaurus
          - - Ilokelesia
            - Carnotaurinae
              - Majungasaurini
                - Arcovenator
                - - Indosaurus
                  - Majungasaurus
                  - Rajasaurus
                - - Dahalokely
                  - Rahiolisaurus
              - Brachyrostra
                - - Ekrixinatosaurus
                  - Skorpiovenator
                - Furileusauria
                  - Viavenator
                  - Pycnonemosaurus
                  - Quilmesaurus
                  - - Carnotaurus
                    - Aucasaurus

Subsequent analyses placed Eoabelisaurus as a basal abelisaurid, a sister taxon of the Abelisauroidea, or an abelisauroid outside the abelisaurid family.

== Paleobiology ==
=== Reduced forelimbs ===
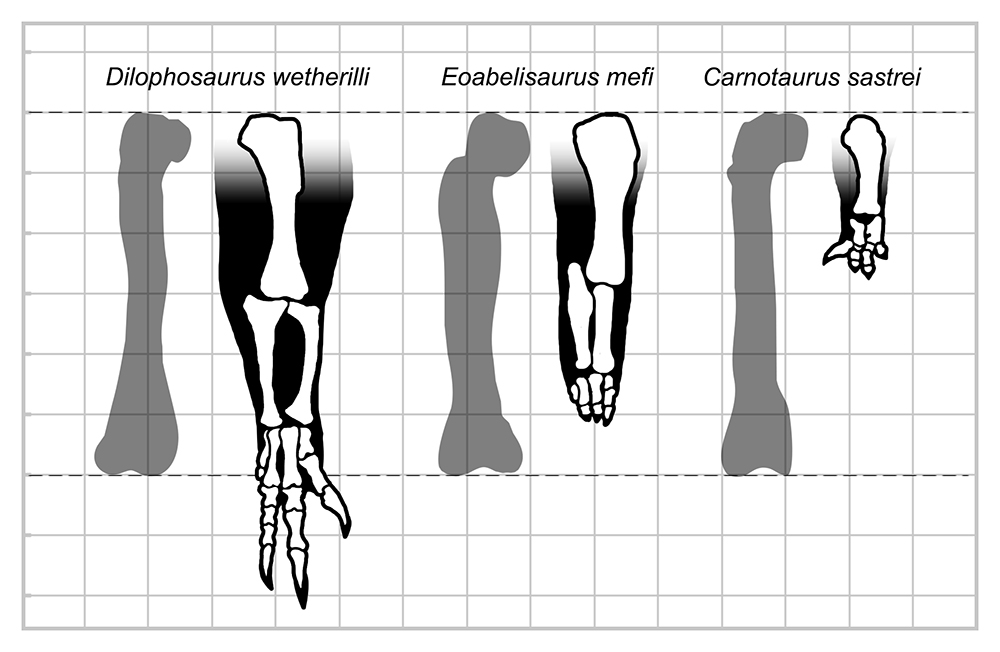
Comparison between Carnotaurus, Dilophosaurus, and Eoabelisaurus forelimbs demonstrating gradual reduction starting at the distal elements

Before the discovery of Eoabelisaurus, abelisaurid anatomy was only known from a handful of Late Cretaceous taxa that were aberrant in their morphology, such as their unusual skull structure and reduction of their forelimbs. Eoabelisaurus shows what was previously an unknown stage in the evolution of abelisaurids, having only some of the cranial modifications and a unique combination of features in its forelimbs. The manus of Eoabelisaurus have a derived morphology, with short and robust metacarpals, non-terminal phalanges, and reduced manual unguals. The humerus is unreduced, and the ulna and radius are shortened but do not differ from more basal ceratosaurs. Therefore, the modification of the forelimbs in the evolution of abelisaurids seems to have occurred in a modular fashion, starting with the distal elements such as the fingers, and only later affecting the more proximal elements. It is with this evidence that Eoabelisaurus confirms a recently proposed evolutionary scenario of abelisaurid limbs based on the incomplete evidence of Cretaceous abelisauroids.

== See also ==
- Timeline of ceratosaur research
