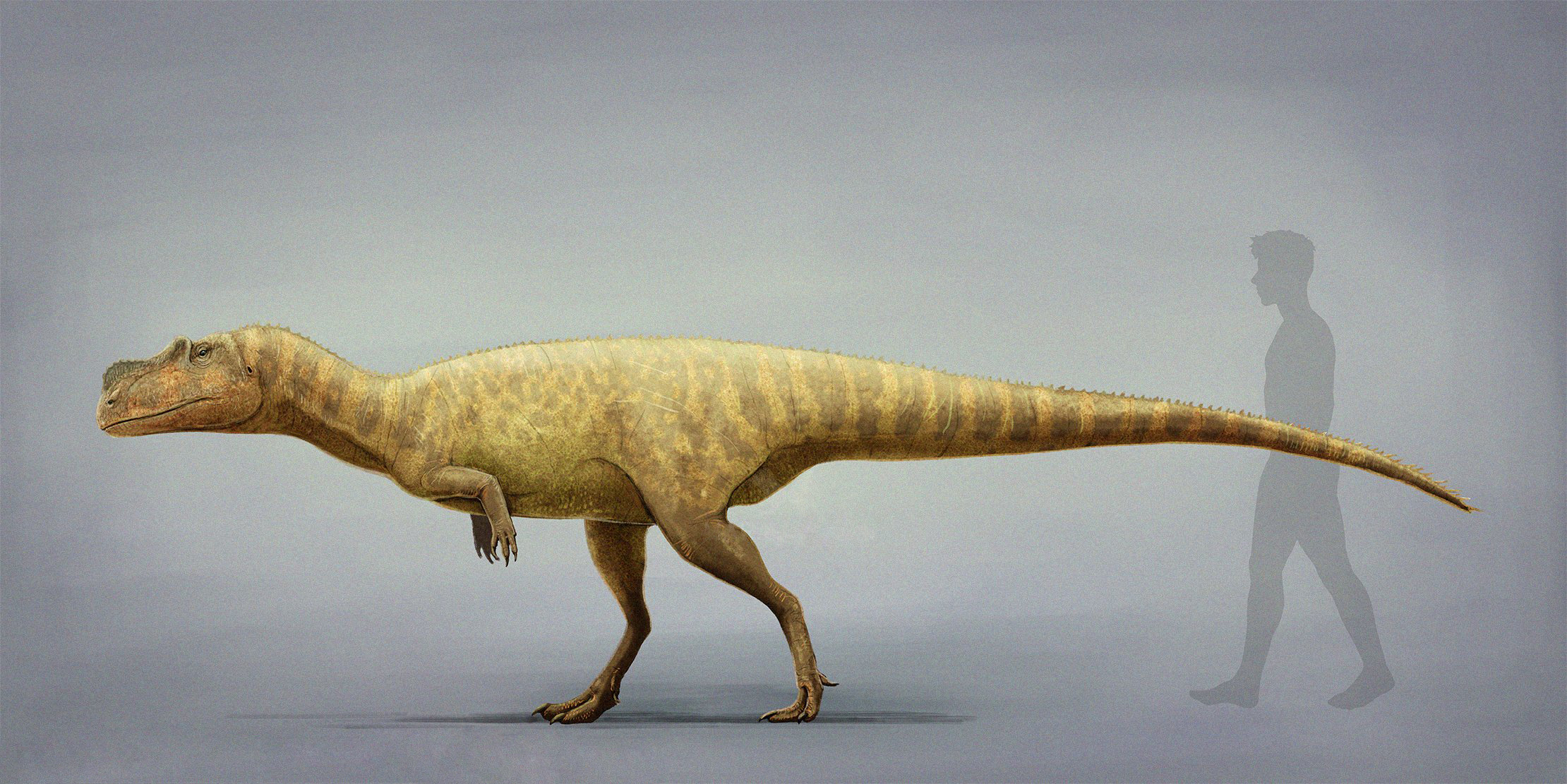
- Life restoration and size comparison

Scientific classification
- Kingdom: Animalia
- Phylum: Chordata
- Class: Reptilia
- Clade: Dinosauria
- Clade: Saurischia
- Clade: Theropoda
- Clade: Averostra
- Clade: †Ceratosauria
- Genus: †Berberosaurus
- Species: †B. liassicus

Binomial name
- †Berberosaurus liassicus Allain et al., 2007

Synonyms
- Berbesaurus Torices et al., 2012 (lapsus calami)

= Berberosaurus =

Berberosaurus Temporal range: Toarcian ~183–174 Ma Uncertain allocation of the layers

Extinct genus of dinosaurs

Berberosaurus (meaning "Berber lizard", in reference to the Berbers of Morocco) is a genus of neotheropod dinosaur, possibly a ceratosaur, from the Toarcian-age (Lower Jurassic) "Toundoute Continental Series" (Azilal Formation) found in the Central High Atlas of Toundoute, Ouarzazate, Morocco. The type species of the genus Berberosaurus is B. liassicus, in reference to the Lias epoch. Berberosaurus might be the oldest known ceratosaur, and is based on partial postcranial remains. This genus represents the oldest formally identified theropod from the North of Africa, as well one of the few from the region in the Early Jurassic.

== Discovery and history ==
The remains of Berberosaurus were discovered during a series of expeditions to the High Atlas beginning in the early 2000s, where over 6 years, they dug in the local redbeds. It is based on an associated partial postcranial skeleton of a subadult individual cataloged in the Muséum d'Histoire Naturelle de Marrakech; bones from this skeleton include MHNM-Pt9 a neck vertebra; MHNM-Pt23, an anterior part of the sacrum; MHNM-Pt22, a metacarpal; MHNM-Pt19, a femur; MHNM-Pt21, proximal end of the left tibia; MHNM-Pt16, distal end of the right tibia; MHNM-Pt20, left fibula; MHNM-To1–218, part of another femur, has been assigned to the genus as well. Its remains were found alongside those of Tazoudasaurus and an indeterminate large-bodied theropod within bone beds in mudflow deposits. Later tectonic activity has affected the bones. Recent papers have quoted that new material of this genus was recovered on the same area, namely the axis, a postorbital, the cranium and teeth, that are currently being studied. Berberosaurus is characterized by the following features: the cervical vertebra is highly pneumatic, with short cervical centra and holes in the neural arch, with low and short neural spine, unlike Elaphrosaurus and Ceratosaurus. It has anteroposteriorly short centra and neural spine; the sacral series markedly arched; the central sacrum narrow transversely; the metacarpal with a very grooved proximal end; anterior femoral trochanter reaches proximally to the midpoint of the femoral head, unlike Ceratosaurus; large femoral trochanteric platform; tibia with subtriangular distal profile; presence of an oblique ridge that covers proximally the medial sulcus of the fibula.

== Classification ==
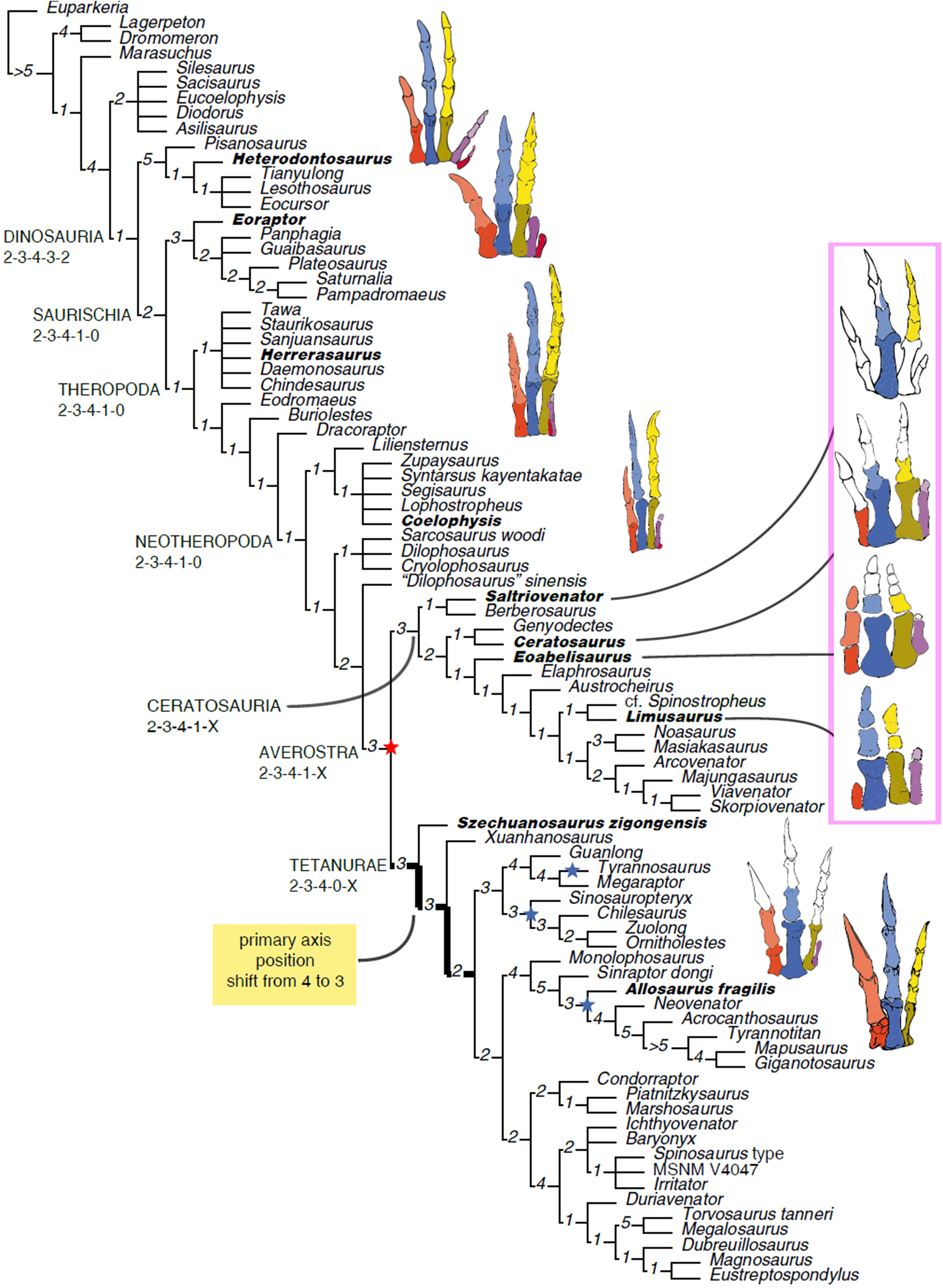
Diagram showing the evolution of the theropod hand, including Berberosaurus, as hypothesized by Dal Sasso and colleagues in 2018

Ronan Allain and colleagues, who described Berberosaurus, performed a phylogenetic analysis and found their new genus to be the most basal known abelisauroid, more derived than Elaphrosaurus, Ceratosaurus, and Spinostropheus, but less so than Xenotarsosaurus and abelisaurians. Berberosaurus is distinguished from other theropods by anatomical details found in its vertebrae, metacarpals, and hindlimb bones. Its assignment as an abelisauroid pushes back the record of this group and shows that it had diversified by the Early Jurassic. However, Carrano and Sampson (2008) found it to be a basal ceratosaur outside Neoceratosauria instead. Subsequently, the analysis of Xu et al. (2009) recovered it as a dilophosaurid in unresolved polytomy with Dilophosaurus wetherilli, "Dilophosaurus" sinensis, Dracovenator and Cryolophosaurus. The phylogenetic analysis performed by Ezcurra, Agnolin and Novas (2010) recovered Berberosaurus in unresolved polytomy with Ceratosaurus and Abelisauroidea, while the 2018 description of the basal ceratosaur Saltriovenator places Berberosaurus as the sister taxon to that genus. Same year, a paper found Berberosaurus in different positions: considered as a basal ceratosaurian, a neoceratosaurian or a basal abelisauroid. The paper which described Berberosaurus was the last one to find a monophyletic Ceratosauria that contained both Coelophysoids and Neoceratosaurs, most papers have since excluded Coelophysoidea from Ceratosauria and instead have favored the idea that Tetanurae and Ceratosauria are both part of a monophyletic group called Averostra, a classification which was already gaining popularity at around that time.

The classification of Berberosaurus based on Delcourt et al. (2018):

- Ceratosauroidea
  - Noasauridae
    - Spinostropheus
    - - Elaphrosaurinae
        - Elaphrosaurus
        - Limusaurus
      - Noasaurinae
        - Deltadromeus
        - Laevisuchus
        - Noasaurus
        - Velocisaurus
        - Masiakasaurus
  - - Berberosaurus
    - Etrigansauria
      - Ceratosauridae
        - Eoabelisaurus
        - - Genyodectes
          - Ceratosaurus
      - Chenanisaurus
      - Abelisauridae
        - Rugops
        - - Abelisaurus
          - - Ilokelesia
            - Carnotaurinae
              - Majungasaurinae
                - Arcovenator
                - - Indosaurus
                  - Majungasaurus
                  - Rajasaurus
                - - Dahalokely
                  - Rahiolisaurus
              - Brachyrostra
                - - Ekrixinatosaurus
                  - Skorpiovenator
                - Furileusauria
                  - Viavenator
                  - Pycnonemosaurus
                  - Quilmesaurus
                  - - Carnotaurus
                    - Aucasaurus

== Paleoecology ==
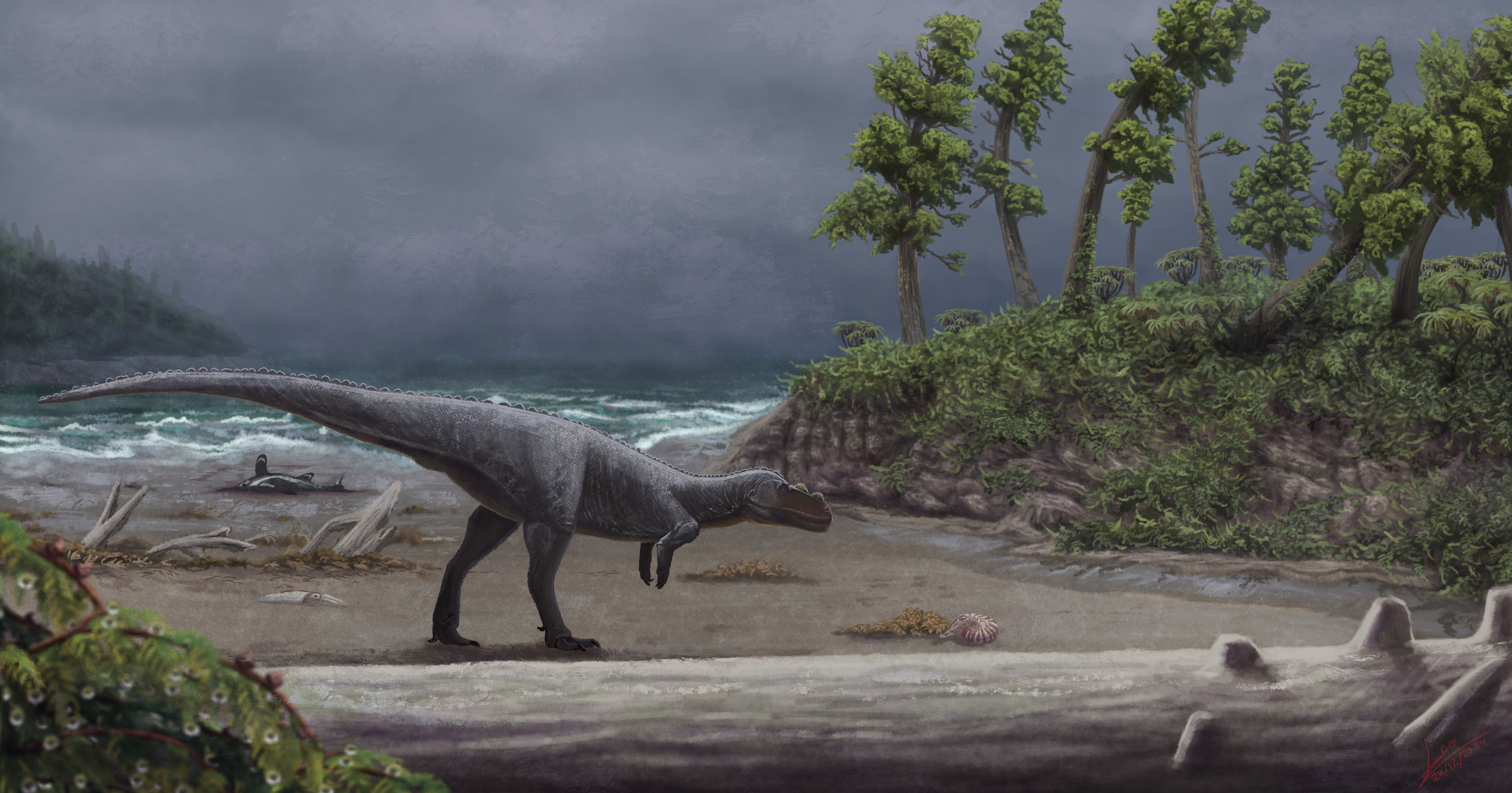
Paleoenvironment reconstruction of the Azilal Formation with Berberosaurus, as a storm-influenced coast. During the Toarcian period, the Tethys bathed the beaches of what is now Morocco. This tropical ocean was often very violent, with recurring storms that especially hit the western beaches.

Berberosaurus is estimated to have been approximately 4.58–5 m (15.0–16.4 ft) long and weighed 300 kg (660 lb). Like other ceratosaurians, it was a bipedal carnivore.

The "Toundoute Continental Series" is unlike other members of the Azilal Formation due to the presence of volcanic material of coeval age. The Azilal Formation recovers a Terrestrial progradation that happened in the Central High Atlas Basin towards the Toarcian, where the older Pliensbachian Carbonate Platform retreated to the east. The lithology of this unit at Tundoute is divided in 5 units from D to H, (A-C represent the units of the underlying marine dolomite, C representing a transition to a terrestrial environment). These layers have been referred to a Pliensbachian-Toarcian age, as the underliying Carbonates belong to the Sinemurian-aged Imi-n-Ifri Formation, with a small transitional layer similar to the Sin-Pliensbachian at Todhra. The section including the bones of Berberosaurus was likely deposited on a channel/floodplain type fluvial system, with sand-filled channels abundant in plant roots (mostly located in fine limestone, probably from the channel margins), developed in the near E-W direction of transit. These layers also recover the presence of thick (up to 6 m) gypsium facies, which suggest the presence of a local Chott, indicating a succession of humid and dry seasons. Based on mesofossils, local vegetation was apparently dominated by ferns, cycads and conifers. Apart from Berberosaurus, Tazoudasaurus and a large-bodied theropod of uncertain affinities, a possible Coelophysidae with juvenile & adult specimens and a small sauropod have been recovered from Acforcid, E of Demnate, as well Gravisaurian (Tazoudasaurus?) remains at the E of Azilal village, Medium-Sized Sauropod remains at Mizaguène Hill (SW Azilal) and indeterminate Dinosaur remains from other locations around Azilal and Demnate.

== See also ==
- Timeline of ceratosaur research
