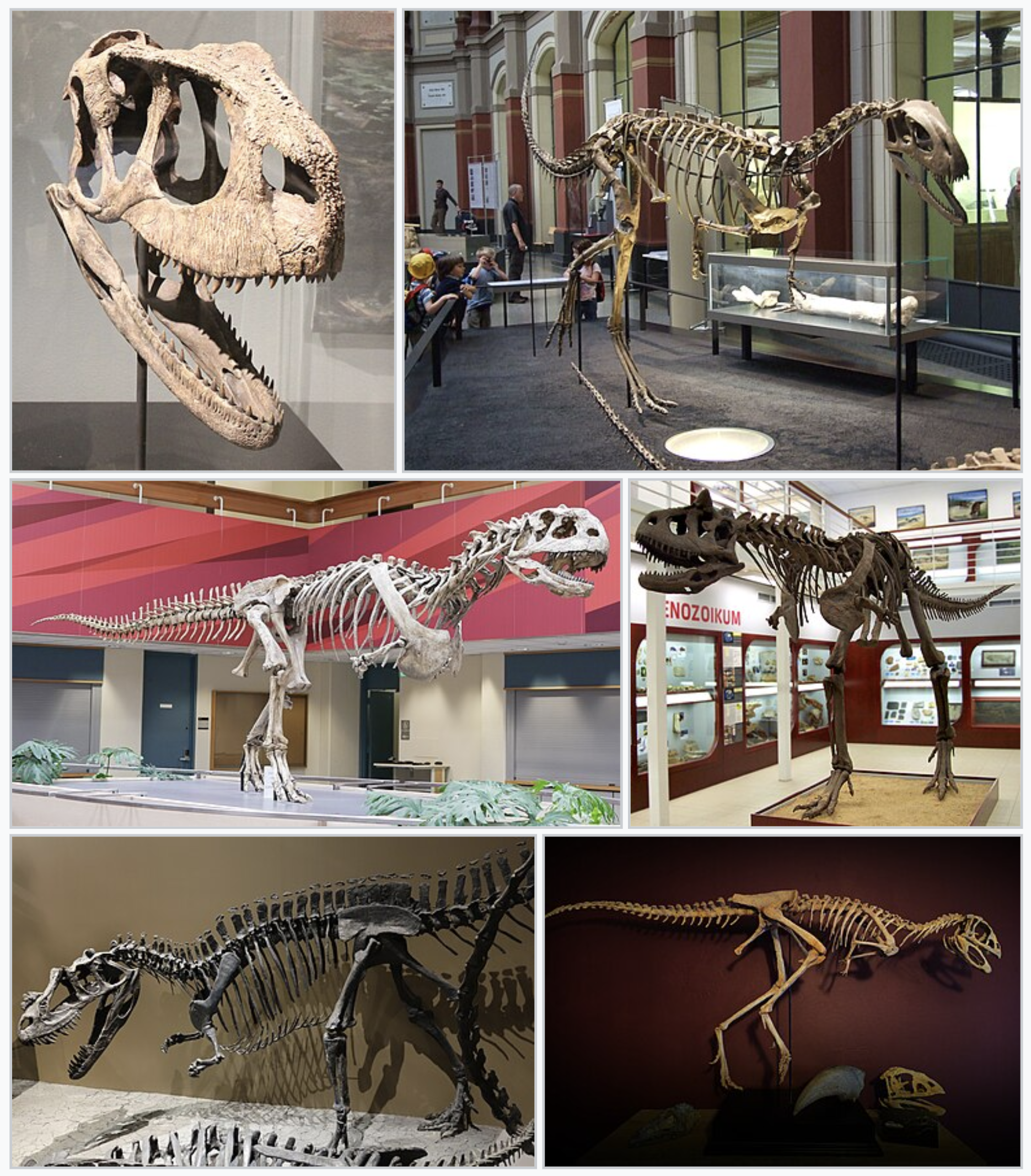
- Six ceratosaurs (top left to bottom right): Rugops, Elaphrosaurus, Majungasaurus, Carnotaurus, Ceratosaurus, Berthasaura

Scientific classification
- Kingdom: Animalia
- Phylum: Chordata
- Class: Reptilia
- Clade: Dinosauria
- Clade: Saurischia
- Clade: Theropoda
- Clade: Averostriformes
- Clade: Averostra
- Clade: †Ceratosauria; Marsh, 1884

Type species
- †Ceratosaurus nasicornis Marsh, 1884

Subgroups
- †Berberosaurus
- †Fosterovenator
- †Saltriovenator
- †Neoceratosauria Novas, 1991
  - †Ceratosauridae Marsh, 1884
    - †Ceratosaurus
    - †Genyodectes
  - †Berthasauridae Hendrickx et al., 2024
    - †Afromimus?
    - †Berthasaura
  - †Abelisauroidea Bonaparte and Novas, 1985
    - †Betasuchus
    - †Dahalokely
    - †Eoabelisaurus
    - †Ligabueino
    - †Abelisauridae
    - †Noasauridae
Possible ceratosaurs
- †Austrocheirus
- †Bahariasaurus
- †Dandakosaurus
- †Deltadromeus
- †Gualicho
- †Ostafrikasaurus
- †Pandoravenator
- †Sarcosaurus
- †Spinostropheus

= Ceratosauria =

Ceratosaurs Temporal range: Sinemurian-Maastrichtian, 199.3–66 Ma

Extinct clade of dinosaurs

Ceratosaurs are members of the clade Ceratosauria, a group of dinosaurs defined as all theropods sharing a more recent common ancestor with Ceratosaurus than with birds. The oldest known ceratosaur, Saltriovenator, dates to the earliest part of the Jurassic, around 199 million years ago. Ceratosauria includes three major clades: Ceratosauridae, Noasauridae, and Abelisauridae, found primarily (though not exclusively) in the Southern Hemisphere. Originally, Ceratosauria included the above dinosaurs plus the Late Triassic to Early Jurassic Coelophysoidea and Dilophosauridae, implying a much earlier divergence of ceratosaurs from other theropods. However, most recent studies have shown that coelophysoids and dilophosaurids do not form a natural group with other ceratosaurs, and are excluded from this group.

Ceratosauria derives its names from the type species, Ceratosaurus nasicornis, described by O.C. Marsh in 1884. A moderately large predator from the Late Jurassic, Ceratosaurus nasicornis, was the first ceratosaur to be discovered. Ceratosaurs are generally moderately large in size, with some exceptions like the larger Carnotaurus and the significantly smaller noasaurs. The major defining characteristics of Ceratosauria include a robust skull with increased ornamentation or height and a shortening of the arms. Both of these characteristics are generally accentuated in later members of the group, such as the abelisaurs, whereas more basal species such as C. nasicornis appear more similar to other basal theropods. The highly fragmented nature of the ceratosaur fossil record means that the characteristics, relationships, and early history of Ceratosauria remain mysterious and highly debated.

== History of study ==
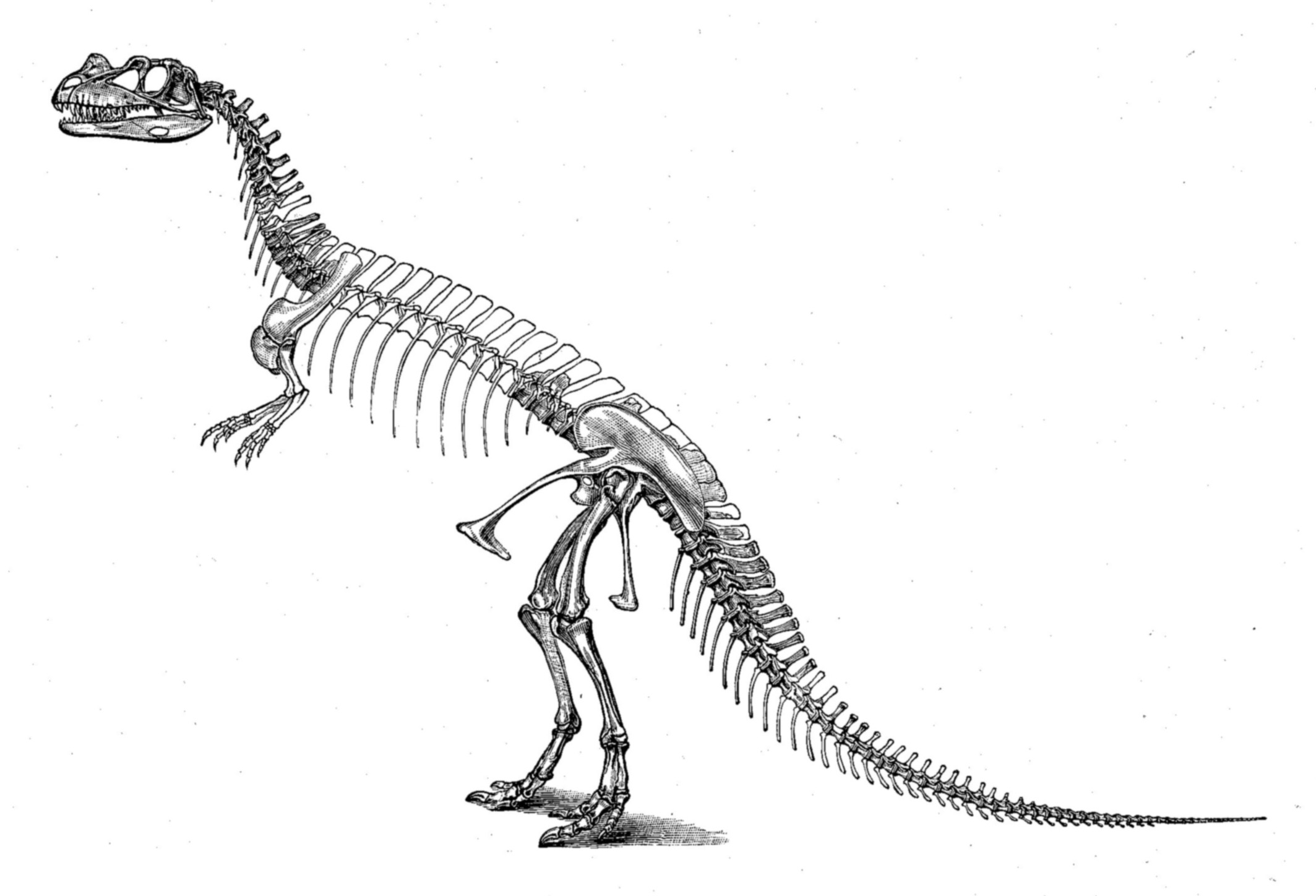
An illustration of the skeleton of Ceratosaurus by O.C. Marsh

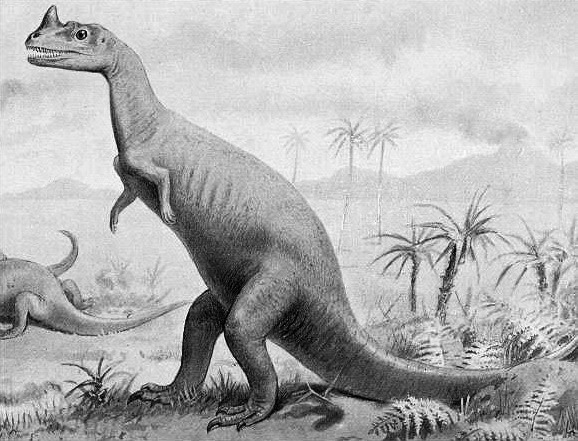
An early life reconstruction of Ceratosaurus

Ceratosauria was first described by O.C. Marsh in the American Journal of Science in 1884. Writing about the newly discovered C. nasicornis, he noted the similarities between the firmly united metatarsals of C. nasicornis and those of Archaeopteryx. Since C. nasicornis was the only other dinosaur discovered at the time to share this trait, Marsh concluded that Ceratosauria must be placed very near Archaeopteryx and its related groups. Marsh also named the family Ceratosauridae in 1884 to contain C. nasicornis. Since then, a number of other species have been referred to this family, mainly from the genus Ceratosaurus.

The idea of the Ceratosauria would be contested by Marsh's rival, Edward Drinker Cope. Cope argued that the taxon was invalid. The idea of the Ceratosauria would regain some support more than thirty years later when Gilmore argued in its favor in 1920. Despite Gilmore's support, few species were added to the group following World War I, and little emphasis was placed on it. In fact, the scientific community's most common interaction with Ceratosauria throughout much of the 20th century was the disputation of its existence, performed by the likes of Romer, Lapparent, Lavocat, Colbert, and Charig amongst others.

Ceratosauria's fortune changed in 1986 when Jacques Gauthier, in an attempt to clarify the evolution of birds, grouped the majority of theropods into either Ceratosauria or Tetanurae. In Ceratosauria, he placed the ceratosaurs and coelophysoids. Gauthier's paper brought Ceratosauria's use back in vogue, and by the early 1990s, Abelisauridae had also been included under Ceratosauria. The triumvirate model of ceratosaurs, coelophysoids, and abelisaurids would go unchallenged until the early 2000s. Beginning at the turn of the millennium, a large number of paleontologists began excluding coelophysoids from Ceratosauria. This view is now widely held thanks to several similarities between Ceratosauria and Tetanurae not found in coelophysoids.

== Phylogeny ==
Size comparison of several abelisaurids

Most paleontologists have postulated that Ceratosauria split off from other theropods in the Late Triassic or earliest Jurassic. Despite this, no ceratosaurs have been discovered prior to the Early Jurassic, and even in the Middle Jurassic, species are sparse. Many scientists, such as Carrano and Sampson, have postulated the lack of specimens is due to a poor fossil record, rather than an indictment on the abundance of ceratosaurs at the time. A similarly large gap of specimens exist in the lower Cretaceous, particularly for Abelisauridae. More recent discoveries have resulted in varying phylogenetic results concerning the relationships between Elaphrosaurus and the derived Cretaceous noasaurids. The precise relationship between Ceratosaurus and the abelisaurids is also not clearly resolved.

Currently, most paleontologists agree that Ceratosauria contains a slightly more exclusive clade, Neoceratosauria, which contains the groups Ceratosauridae and Abelisauroidea, with some variance as to which taxa are placed into basal polytomy. Abelisauroidea is further divided into the Abelisauridae and Noasauridae, with Abelisauridae, including Carnotaurinae. Recently, Rauhut and Carrano have placed Elaphrosaurinae inside Noasauridae while simultaneously moving the previous noasaurs into Noasaurinae. Into their new Noasauridae, they have uniquely included Deltadromeus and Limusaurus.

It is difficult to discern possible synapomorphies of Ceratosauridae from autapomorphies of Ceratosaurus because the remains of the related Genyodectes are so fragmentary; e.g. Ceratosaurus is different from other ceratosaurians by the very prominent horn on its snout; Genyodectes, however, was not found with a complete skull; whether it had a horn is unknown, so it cannot establish that the horn was a shared derived feature of the group. However, due to the shared similarities between the teeth of the two genera, synapomorphies have been recognized in the teeth. The synapomorphies that do exist include: overlap of the second and third premaxillary alveoli in palatal view, largest crown in subadults/adults higher than six centimeters, subquadrangular mesial denticles at two-thirds of the crown in lateral teeth. Currently the only generally-recognized ceratosaurid species outside the genus Ceratosaurus is Genyodectes from the Cretaceous or Patagonia. The taxa Eoabelisaurus and Ostafrikasaurus are also probable ceratosaurs, but it is unknown if they belong to Ceratosauridae. Delcourt (2018) defined Ceratosauridae as "the most inclusive clade containing Ceratosaurus nasicornis but not Carnotaurus sastrei".

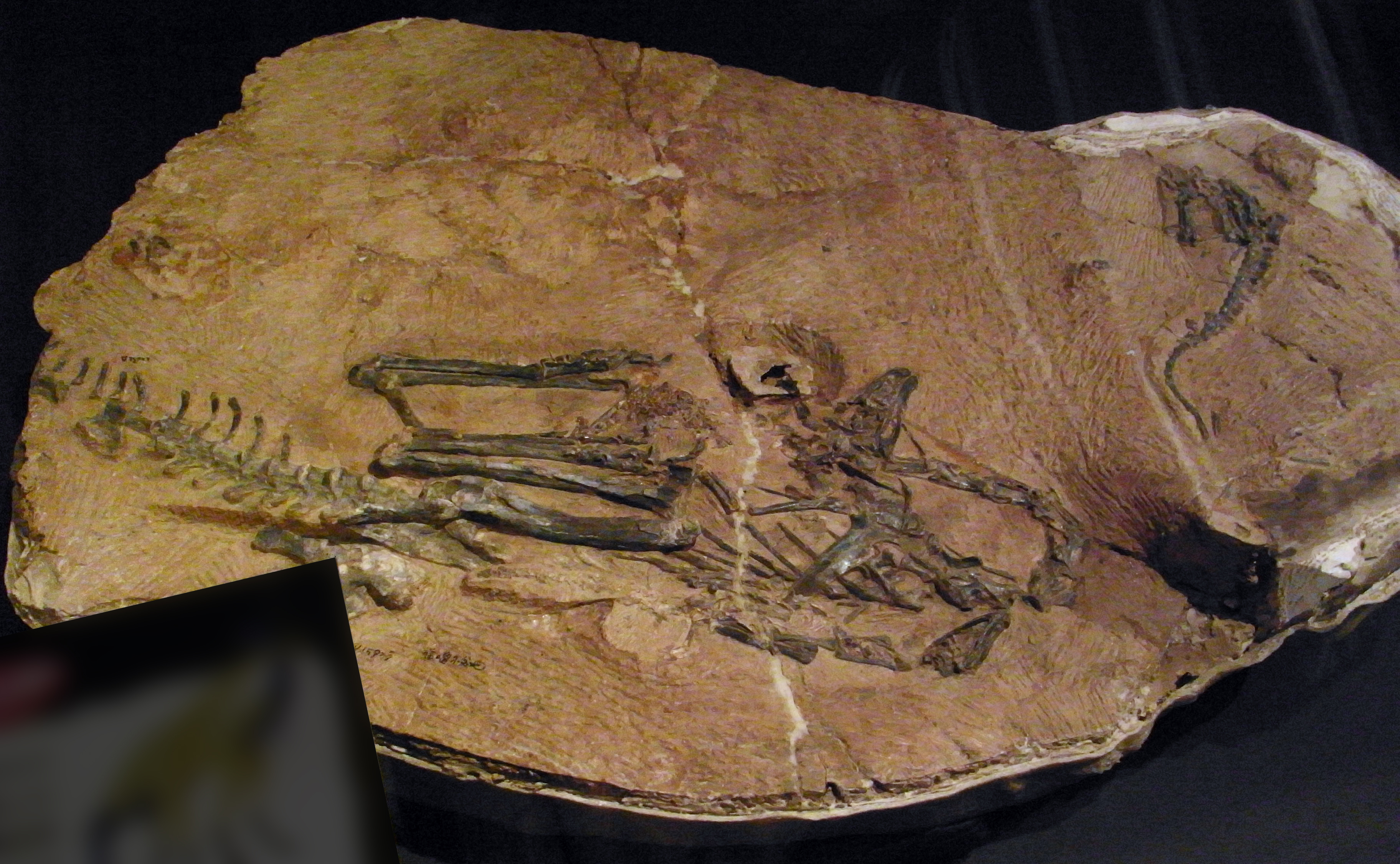
The holotype of Limusaurus, one of the most well-known ceratosaurs

Abelisauroidea is a diverse superfamily of ceratosaurians and the sister taxon of Ceratosauridae. It is typically regarded as a Cretaceous group, though the earliest abelisaurid remains are known from the Middle Jurassic of Argentina (classified as the species Eoabelisaurus mefi) and possibly Madagascar (fragmentary remains of an unnamed species). Possible abelisaurid remains (an isolated left tibia, right femur, and right tibia) were also discovered in Late Jurassic Tendaguru Beds in Tanzania.

Abelisauroids flourished in the Southern Hemisphere during the Cretaceous period, but their origins can be traced back to at least the Middle Jurassic, when they had a more global distribution (the earliest known abelisauroid remains come from Australian and South American deposits dated to about 170 million years ago). By the Cretaceous period, abelisauroids had apparently become extinct in Asia and North America, possibly due to competition from tyrannosauroids. However, advanced abelisauroids of the family Abelisauridae persisted in the southern continents until the Cretaceous–Paleogene extinction event 66 million years ago.

In an assessment of the phylogenetic position of Eoabelisaurus, the analysis found it as the most basal member of the Abelisauridae. Abelisaurid synapomorphies include the laterally covered lacrimal antorbital fossa, broad cervical prespinal fossae, anteroposteriorly short anterior caudal neural spines, absence of a ventral groove in the anterior caudals, presence of rudimentary centrodiapophyseal laminae in the anterior mid-caudals, reduced distal ginglymus in the manual phalanges, and the presence of a flexor depression in the pedal unguals. Alternative phylogenetic placements of Eoabelisaurus are significantly suboptimal, except for a slightly more basal position. Noasaurids had longer arms than their relatives the abelisaurids, whose arms were tiny and diminished. Although by no means as large or specialized as the arms of advanced bird-like theropods, noasaurid arms were nevertheless capable of movement and use, possibly even for hunting in large-clawed genera such as Noasaurus. Some genera such as Limusaurus did have somewhat reduced arms and hands, but far from the extent that abelisaurids acquired. Noasaurids were also nimble and lightly built, with feet showing adaptations for running such as a long central foot bone. Noasaurids varied in size, from the small Velocisaurus under 5 feet (1.5 meters) long, to much larger genera such as Elaphrosaurus and Deltadromeus, which were more than 20 feet (6.1 meters) in length.

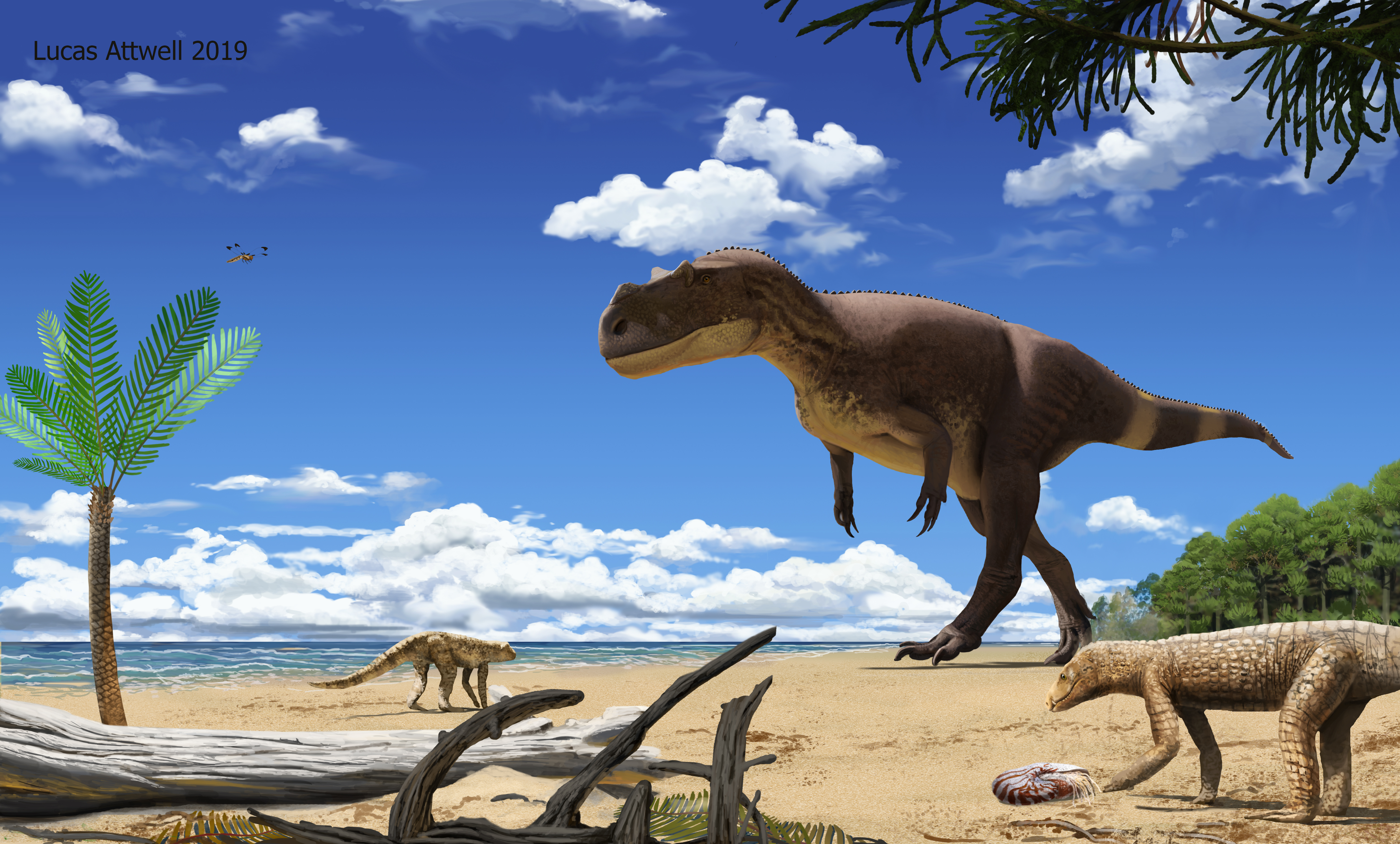
One of the earliest ceratosaurs, Saltriovenator, in its environment

The oldest known ceratosaur currently described is Saltriovenator zanellai which is dated to the Early Sinemurian, 199-197 Ma. The origin of Ceratosauria could have been in Northern Pangea where Saltriovenator, its close relative Berberosaurus, and Carmelopodus footprints have been found.

The following family tree illustrates a synthesis of the relationships of the major theropod groups based on various studies conducted in the 2010s and demonstrates the position of Ceratosauria within theropods.

- Theropoda
  - †Herrerasauridae
  - - †Eoraptor
    - - †Eodromaeus
      - - †Daemonosaurus
        - - †Tawa
          - Neotheropoda
            - †Coelophysoidea
            - - †Dilophosauridae
              - Averostra
                - †Ceratosauria
                - Tetanurae
                  - †Megalosauroidea
                  - Avetheropoda
                    - †Allosauroidea
                    - Coelurosauria

A diagram of the hand bones of Carnotaurus, illustrating the four-fingered condition of ceratosaurs, unlike more derived theropods, which only have three fingers

The following cladogram shows the internal relationships within Ceratosauria following an analysis by Diego Pol and Oliver W. M. Rauhut, 2012.

- Ceratosauria
  - Berberosaurus
  - Deltadromeus
  - - - Spinostropheus
      - - Limusaurus
        - Elaphrosaurus
    - Neoceratosauria
      - Ceratosauridae
        - Ceratosaurus
        - Genyodectes
      - Abelisauroidea
        - Noasauridae
          - Laevisuchus
          - Masiakasaurus
          - Noasaurus
          - Velocisaurus
        - Abelisauridae
          - Eoabelisaurus
          - - Rugops
            - - Abelisaurus
              - Carnotaurinae
                - - Majungasaurus
                  - Indosaurus
                  - Rajasaurus
                - Brachyrostra
                  - - Ilokelesia
                    - Ekrixinatosaurus
                    - Skorpiovenator
                  - Carnotaurini
                    - Carnotaurus
                    - Aucasaurus

A different conclusion was reached in a 2017 paper on Limusaurus ontogeny. Unlike other analyses, Noasauridae was placed more basal than Ceratosaurus, with the latter being within Abelisauridae by definition. This was later expanded on in a 2018 paper on ceratosaur paleobiology, which named a new clade Etrigansauria, which contained the families Abelisauridae and Ceratosauridae. The following cladogram is a consensus tree of the latest phylogenies shown in the paper.

- Ceratosauroidea
  - Noasauridae
    - Spinostropheus
    - - Elaphrosaurinae
        - Elaphrosaurus
        - Limusaurus
      - Noasaurinae
        - Deltadromeus
        - Laevisuchus
        - Noasaurus
        - Velocisaurus
        - Masiakasaurus
  - - Berberosaurus
    - Etrigansauria
      - Ceratosauridae
        - Eoabelisaurus
        - - Genyodectes
          - Ceratosaurus
      - Chenanisaurus
      - Abelisauridae
        - Rugops
        - - Abelisaurus
          - - Ilokelesia
            - Carnotaurinae
              - Majungasaurinae
                - Arcovenator
                - - Indosaurus
                  - Majungasaurus
                  - Rajasaurus
                - - Dahalokely
                  - Rahiolisaurus
              - Brachyrostra
                - - Ekrixinatosaurus
                  - Skorpiovenator
                - Furileusauria
                  - Viavenator
                  - Pycnonemosaurus
                  - Quilmesaurus
                  - - Carnotaurus
                    - Aucasaurus

== Paleobiology ==
=== Anatomy ===
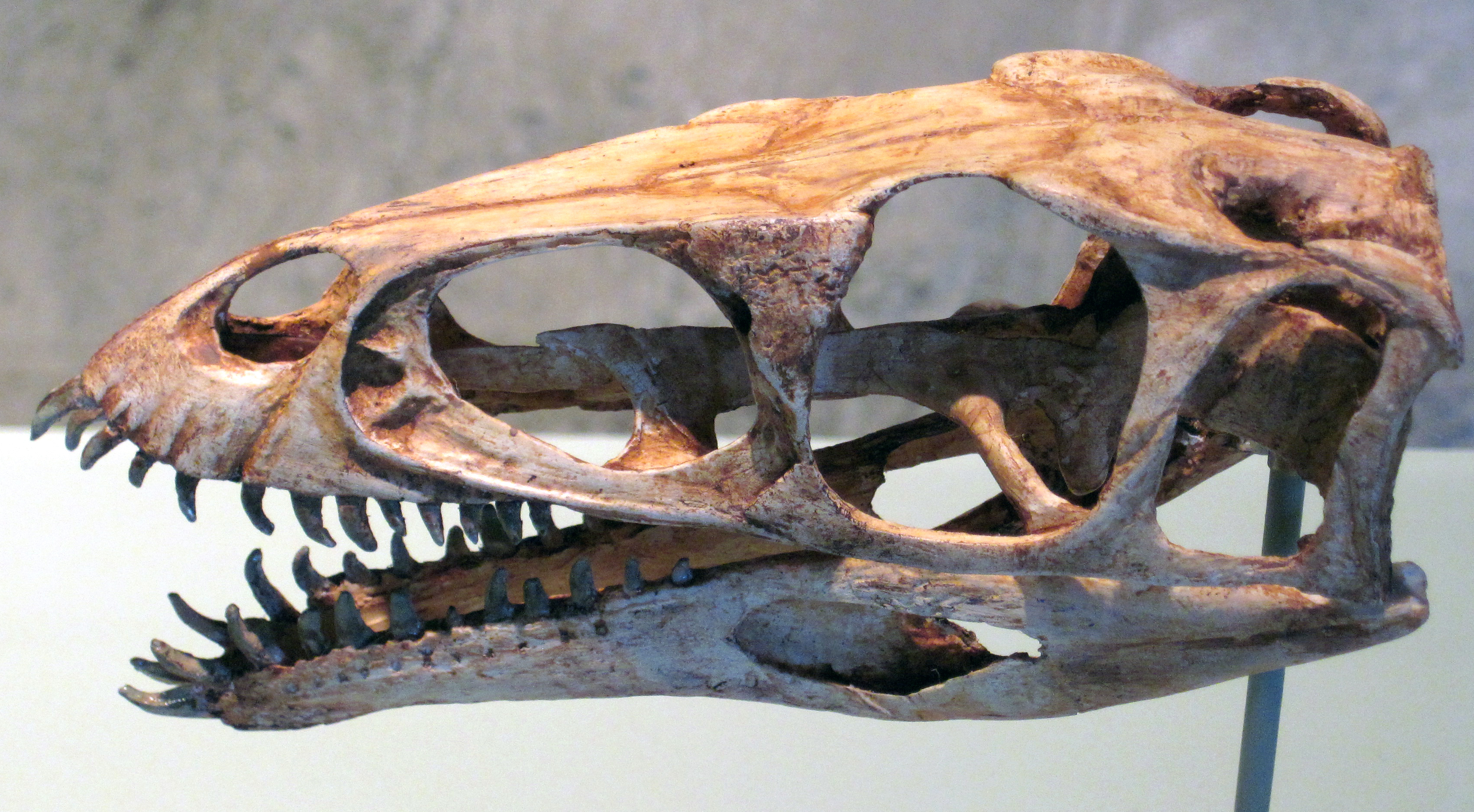
The skull of Masiakasaurus, exemplifying the unusual tooth structure of some noasaurids

Some of the defining characteristics of Ceratosauria include an increase in height and ornamentation of the skull, as well as a shortening of the forelimbs. Likewise, ceratosaurs fused their ilium, ischium, and pubis together, as well as the astragalus and calcaneum. For less derived members of the group, such as C. nasicornis, traits such as raising of the skull and shortening of the forelimbs were not as noticeable. The skull of C. nasicornis was rather similar to the basal theropod mold, with a distinguishing nasal crest to go along with lacrimal crests similar to the contemporary Allosaurus. C. nasicornis had larger teeth than Allosaurus, and some paleontologists postulate that it would have had a difficult time attacking larger prey. Abelisaurids, however, carried many of these defining traits to their extremes. Most abelisaurids had largely shortened forelimbs, with Carnotaurus having shrunk them further than any large theropod. After analyzing the features of the newly discovered Rugops primus, Paul Sereno has postulated that many of these abelisaurid features may lend themselves to scavenging. Despite the huge reduction in size, no taxa in Ceratosauria ever lost a digit or any critical elements of the forelimb. Some joint variation has also been observed in Ceratosauria, and it has been postulated that they may have had better shoulder mobility than other large theropods.

There are two known types of Ceratosaurus teeth: one with longitudinal ridges and the other with veined enamel. Both types of teeth have crowns with a teardrop-shaped cross section and carinae running up the middle. The cross section of the tooth's base depends on the position of the tooth in the mouth with front teeth having less symmetric cross sections.

Complete skeletons have been described only for the most advanced abelisaurids (such as Carnotaurus and Aucasaurus), making the establishment of defining features of the skeleton for the family as a whole more difficult. However, most are known from at least some skull bones, so known shared features come mainly from the skull. Many abelisaurid skull features are shared with carcharodontosaurids. These shared features, along with the fact that Abelisauridae seem to have replaced Carcharodontosauridae in South America, has led to suggestions that the two groups were related. Noasaurids were considered to be distinctive abelisauroids with a peculiar "sickle claw" on the second toe of the foot, convergently developed with that of deinonychosaurians. Among noasaurids, the Argentinean genera Noasaurus (Later Cretaceous) and Ligabueino (Early Cretaceous) are known from incomplete specimens, including disarticulated non-ungual phalanges and in Noasaurus, a claw. A detailed overview of these elements indicates that the supposed raptorial claw of the second pedal digit actually belongs to the first or second finger of the manus, and the putative pedal non-ungual phalanges or both genera also pertain to the manus.

== Paleoecology ==
=== Geography ===
Ceratosaurs appeared to have had a global population that diverged by the early Jurassic. However, they appear to have largely disappeared from Laurasia in the Cretaceous, with those few specimens that have been discovered having been possibly reintroduced from Gondwana. No confirmed specimens of ceratosaurs in North America during the Cretaceous have been found.

Abelisaurids in particular had great success in Gondwana, particularly in the Cretaceous. Some Gondwanan and Laurasian specimens have recently been found and dated to Late Jurassic, and possibly even the Middle Jurassic, greatly extending the abelisaurid timeline. Some paleontologists have postulated that a large desert may have kept abelisaurids locked in southern Gondwana until the late Jurassic. Whether correlation or causation, it has been largely observed that late Cretaceous ceratosaurs were found less in areas dominated by basal tetanurans (Africa) or coelurosaurs (North America and Asia).

=== Diet ===
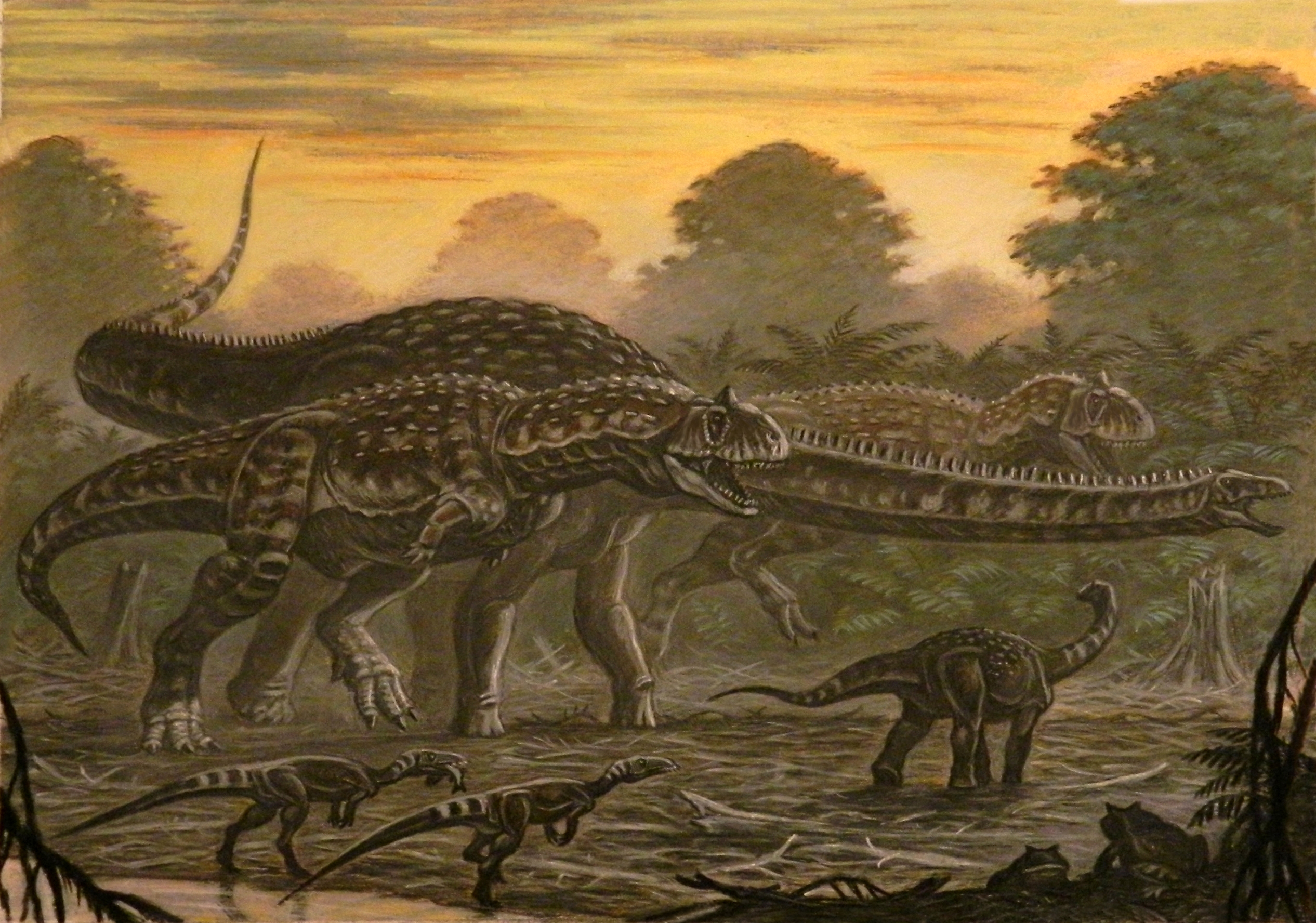
Two Majungasaurus (abelisaurids) hunting a sauropod with two Masiakasaurus (noasaurids) in the foreground

As with most theropods, ceratosaurs were carnivores—except for some noasaurs like Limusaurus and Berthasaura, which were omnivores or herbivores with toothless beaks. Ceratosaurus has been argued to have eaten a large amount of fish and other aquatic creatures, though this has been disputed by many paleontologists. Tooth marks on large animals such as Allosaurus indicate that Ceratosaurus likely utilized scavenging often. The interesting jaws of the abelisaurids have drawn mixed dietary predictions. One study on Carnotaurus found that its bite, thanks to its shortened skull, was suited for hunting small prey, thanks to a quick, but relatively weak bite. On the other hand, other groups of paleontologists have found that the bite of Carnotaurus was relatively powerful, and more adept at hunting and wounding large prey.

Others have postulated its skull was built for scavenging. The debate over the eating habits of ceratosaurs is quite active, particularly recently with the increase in abelisaur discoveries. Using three methods, namely a cladistic analysis performed on a dentition-based data matrix, and discriminant and cluster analyses conducted on a large dataset of theropod teeth measurements, three dental morphotypes which are confidently referred to abelisaurid theropods are identifiable. Whether the morphotypes represent different abelisaurid subclades or different positional entities within the jaw of the same abelisaurid species, is unknown. Such an identification, nevertheless, provides additional evidence of abelisaurids feeding on sauropod carcasses.

Studies of Majungasaurus indicate that it was a much slower-growing dinosaur than other theropods, taking nearly 20 years to reach adult size. Similar studies on other abelisaurid genera indicate that this slow maturation may have been a common trait to the whole of Abelisauridae. Noasaurines are Late Cretaceous noasaurids known exclusively from southern continents and islands such as South America, Madagascar, and India. Elaphrosaurines were lightly built theropods, with small skulls and long necks and legs. If Limusaurus is any indication, adult elaphrosaurines were completely toothless, and their mouths were probably edged with a horny beak. It is likely that Limusaurus and other elaphrosaurines were primarily herbivorous as adults, due to mature Limusaurus specimens preserving gastroliths and chemical signatures resembling those of herbivorous dinosaurs.

=== Paleoenvironment ===
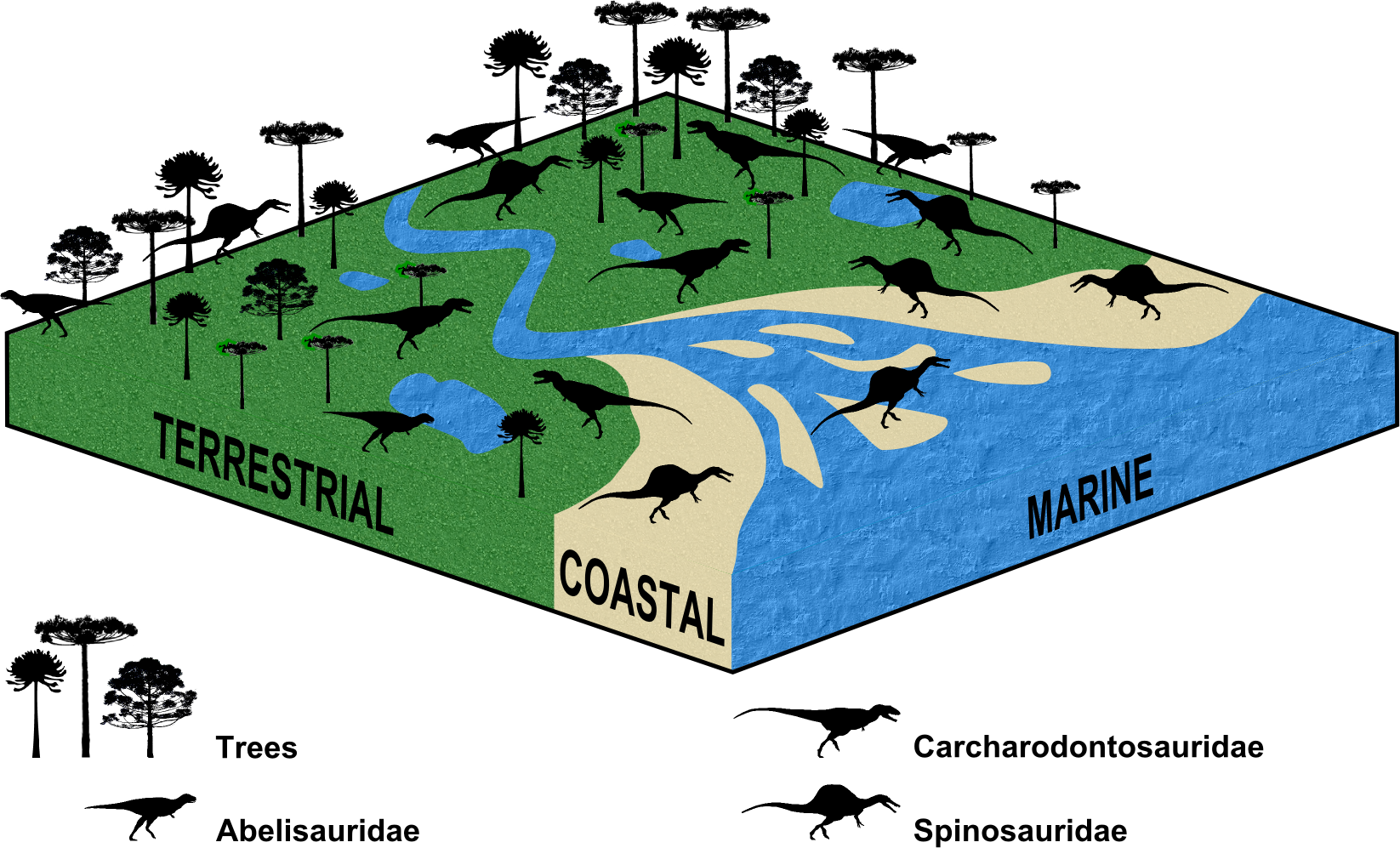
A diagram of hypothesized theropod ecologies in Gondwana during the Cretaceous, with ceratosaurian abelisaurs featuring prominently

Being found in the Morrison and Tendaguru put the family Ceratosauridae in the presence of other large predators. In North America, it is likely that members of the family such as C. nasicornis competed with allosaurids (A. fragilis) for food, such as sauropods common to the region at the time. In Africa and Europe members also competed with other large predators for similar food sources. The presence of C. nasicornis at the Cleveland-Lloyd Dinosaur Quarry along with the remains of several allosaurids is a good indication of just how close members of this family and other predators coexisted.

Most abelisauroid ceratosaurs were found in Madagascar, Asia, or sometimes in Africa. Abelisauridae thrived during the Cretaceous period on the ancient southern supercontinent of Gondwana, and today their fossil remains are found on the modern continents of Africa and South America, as well as on the Indian subcontinent and the island of Madagascar. In Madagascar, Majungasaurus was discovered by French paleontologist Charles Depéret. Majungasaurus was the most common abelisauroid which we know. In South America, many abelisauroids such as Skorpiovenator, Quilmesaurus, Aucasarus, Ilokelesia, and Pyconemosaurus are known. Kurupi itaata represents the first formally named vertebrate of the Marília Formation (Bauru Group, Bauru Basin) and one of the few theropod records for the Maastrichtian of the Bauru Basin. Its abelisaurid affinities are well established based on the anatomy of the pelvis and anterior caudal vertebrae; however, closer relationships with other abelisaurids are still unclear. The specimens provide new information on abelisauroids, which are still poorly known in the Brazilian fossil record, and on the distribution of this group of theropod dinosaurs in South America. These discoveries indicate that abelisauroids were the most common large predatory dinosaurs where they lived.

== See also ==
- Gondwana
- Timeline of ceratosaur research
