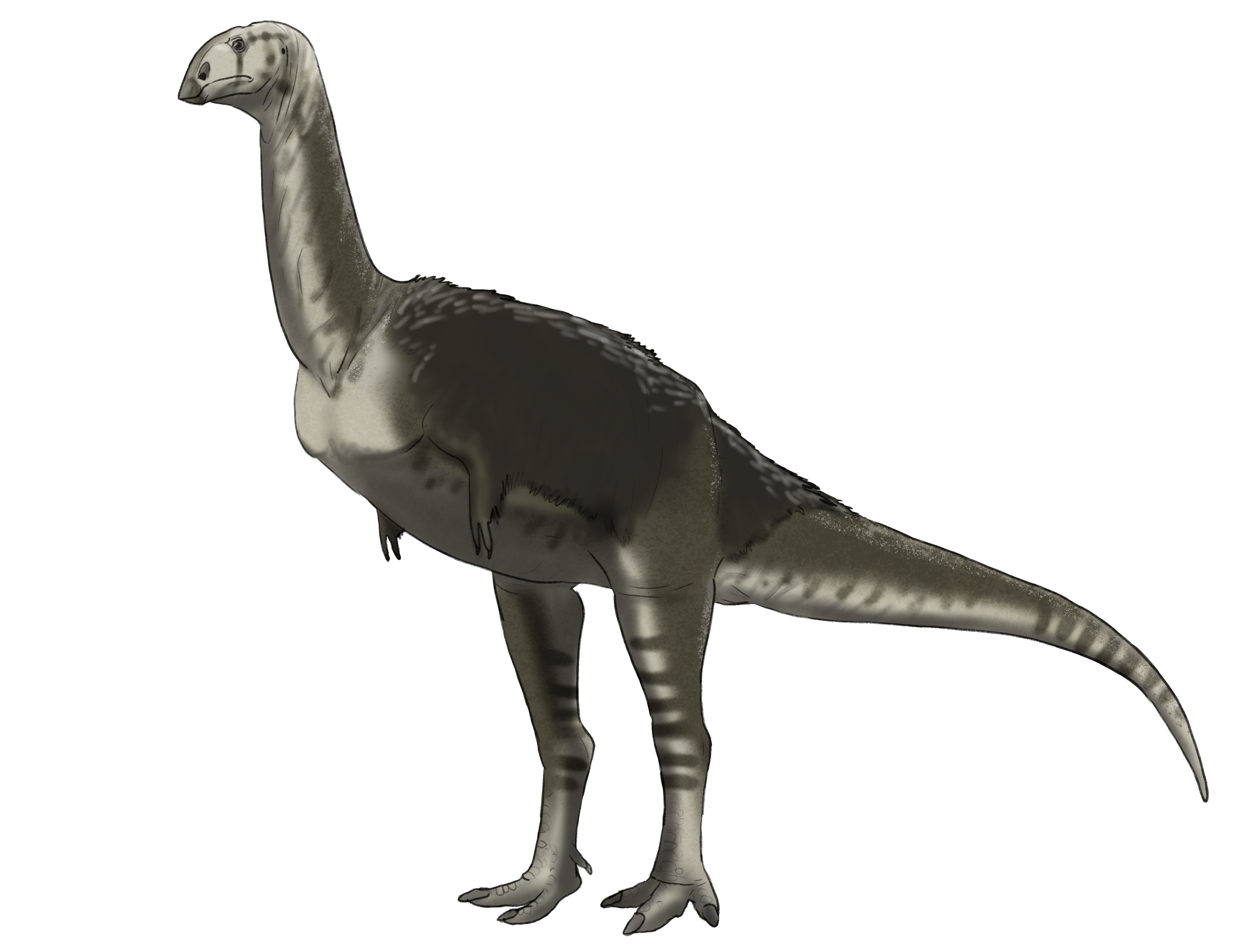
- Speculative reconstruction of Spinostropheus as a noasaurid

Scientific classification
- Kingdom: Animalia
- Phylum: Chordata
- Class: Reptilia
- Clade: Dinosauria
- Clade: Saurischia
- Clade: Theropoda
- Clade: Averostriformes
- Genus: †Spinostropheus; Sereno et al., 2004

Type species
- †Spinostropheus gautieri Lapparent, 1960 (originally Elaphrosaurus gautieri)

= Spinostropheus =

Spinostropheus Temporal range: Middle Jurassic, 167–164 Ma

Extinct genus of dinosaurs

Spinostropheus is a genus of theropod dinosaur that lived in the Middle Jurassic period and has been found in the Tiourarén Formation, Niger. The type and only species is S. gautieri.

== History of discovery ==
In 1959, Albert-Félix de Lapparent excavated fossils near Oued Timmersöi, west of In Tedreft in the Agadez desert. Among the finds were the remains of a theropod. In 1960, de Lapparent, based on these, named a second species of the genus Elaphrosaurus, E. gautieri. The specific name honours François Gautier, the discoverer of the type locality.

In 2004, Paul Sereno, Jeffrey A. Wilson and John Conrad named a separate genus: Spinostropheus. The generic name is derived from Latin spina, "spine", and Greek στροφεύς, stropheus, "vertebra", and refers to the epipophyseal processes of the cervical vertebrae, which are prominent and dorso-ventrally flattened.

The holotype, MNHN 1961-28, was found in a layer of the Tiouraren Formation dating from the Bathonian-Oxfordian. De Lapparent had presumed that the strata dated from the Early Cretaceous. It consists of a cervical vertebra, seven pieces of the dorsals, three pieces of the sacrum, five tail vertebrae, a humerus, the lower end of a pubic bone, the lower end of a thighbone, a piece of a shinbone, a piece of a fibula, a metatarsal, four additional pieces of the metatarsus and a phalanx of a toe. The paratypes were an ulna, a metatarsal and a second partial skeleton consisting of vertebrae and limb elements. In 2004, Sereno et al. referred a third skeleton, specimen MNN TIG6 consisting of a series of cervical and dorsal vertebrae with some ribs. However, this specimen differs from Spinostropheus and likely belongs to a different noasaurid taxon. Other material referred to it includes cervical, dorsal, and caudal vertebra, partial left humerus, ulna, distal pubis, distal femur, incomplete tibia, fibulae, metatarsals, pedal phalangeal fragments, and manual unguals.

== Description ==
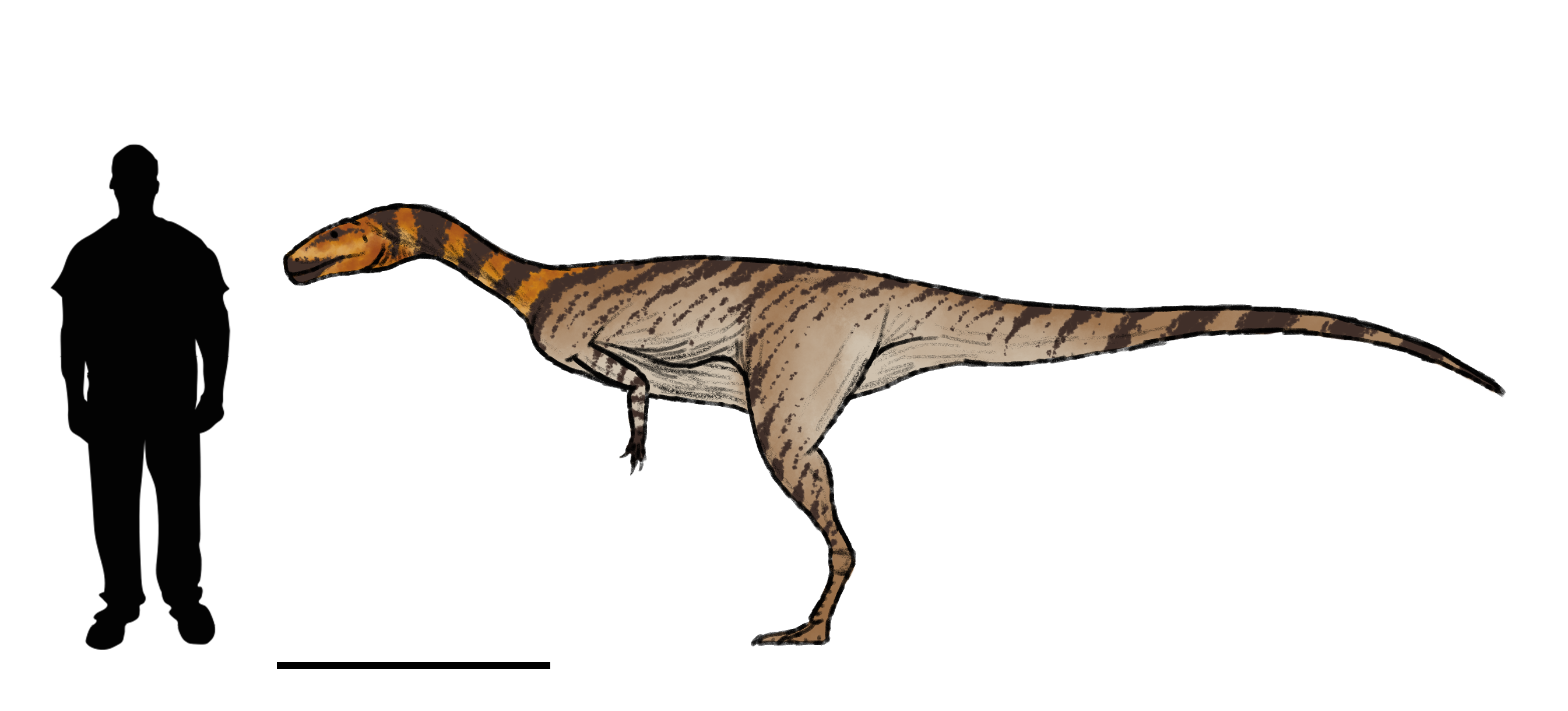
Size comparison

Spinostropheus was a relatively small theropod. In 2010, Gregory S. Paul estimated its length at 4 metres (13 feet), and its weight at 200 kg (441 lbs). In 2012 Thomas R. Holtz Jr gave a length of 6.2 meters (20.3 feet).

== Classification ==
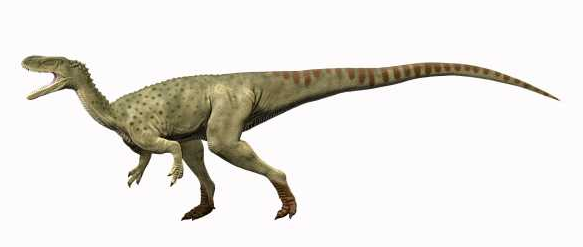
Speculative life restoration of Spinostropheus as a generalized theropod

In 2002, a cladistic analysis by Sereno et al found Spinostropheus to be the sister taxon of the Abelisauria. In this study only the data from specimen MNN TIG6 were considered. Subsequent studies have recovered it as a basal ceratosaur based on the specimen MNN TIG6, outside of Neoceratosauria, more closely in the evolutionary tree to Elaphrosaurus. According to Carrano et al. (2012), this taxon is a basal Tetanuran. Spinostro Rauhut and Carrano (2016) believe that the holotype and paratype specimens of Spinostropheus lack ceratosaurian features, unlike the specimen MNN TIG6 which they consider ceratosaurian, and suggest that Spinostropheus might be a basal tetanuran.

In their 2020 description of the abelisaurid Spectrovenator, Zaher et al. recovered the Spinostropheus holotype as the sister taxon to the Averostra. The referred specimen, MNN TIG6, was found in a clade with Camarillasaurus as the basalmost noasaurids:

- Neotheropoda
  - Syntarsus
  - - Dilophosaurus
    - - - Spinostropheus
        - Averostra
          - Tetanurae
          - Ceratosauria
            - Ceratosauridae
              - Berberosaurus
              - Genyodectes
              - Ceratosaurus
            - Abelisauroidea
              - - Noasauridae
                  - - MNN TIG6 (referred to Spinostropheus)
                    - Camarillasaurus
                  - - Deltadromeus
                    - - Noasaurinae
                      - Elaphrosaurinae
                - Abelisauridae

== See also ==
- Timeline of ceratosaur research
