= Ligabueino =

Ligabueino Temporal range: Early Cretaceous, 125 Ma

Scientific classification
- Kingdom: Animalia
- Phylum: Chordata
- Class: Reptilia
- Clade: Dinosauria
- Clade: Saurischia
- Clade: Theropoda
- Genus: †Ligabueino; Bonaparte, 1996
- Species: †L. andesi

Binomial name
- †Ligabueino andesi Bonaparte, 1996

Extinct genus of dinosaurs

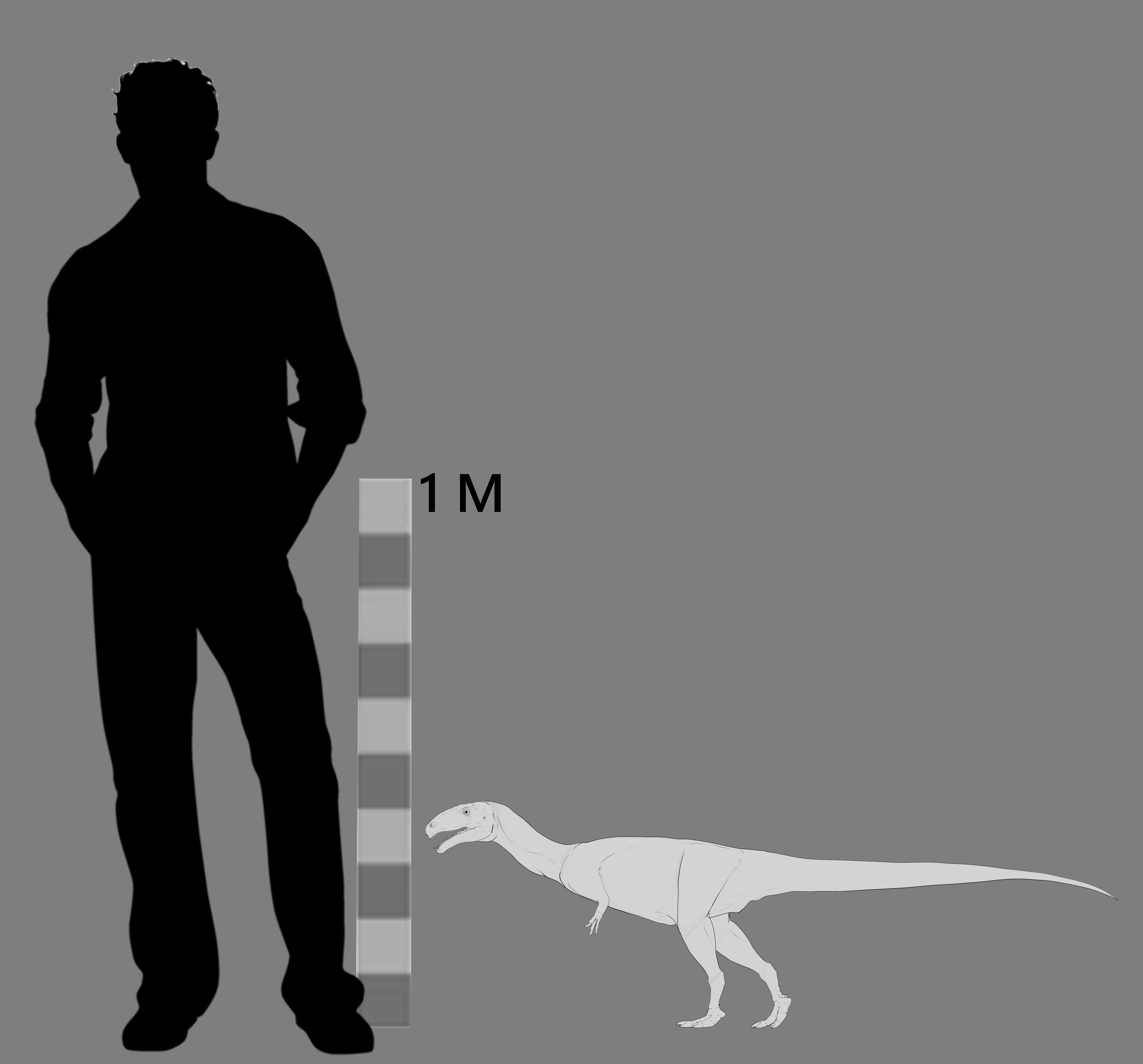
Size compared to a human; anatomical details are speculative

Ligabueino (meaning "Ligabue's little one") is a genus of abelisauroid theropod dinosaur named after its discoverer, Italian doctor Giancarlo Ligabue. It is known only from an extremely fragmentary specimen, measuring 79 cm (2.6 ft) long, found in the La Amarga Formation. In spite of initial reports that it was an adult, the unfused vertebrae indicate that the specimen was a juvenile. It was a theropod and lived during the Early Cretaceous Period (Barremian to early Aptian), in what is now Patagonia. Contrary to initial classifications that placed it as a member of the Noasauridae, Carrano and colleagues found in 2011 that it could only be placed with any confidence in the group Abelisauroidea. In 2024, Ligabueino was recovered as a sister taxon of Berthasauridae and Abelisauroidea.

== See also ==
- Timeline of ceratosaur research
