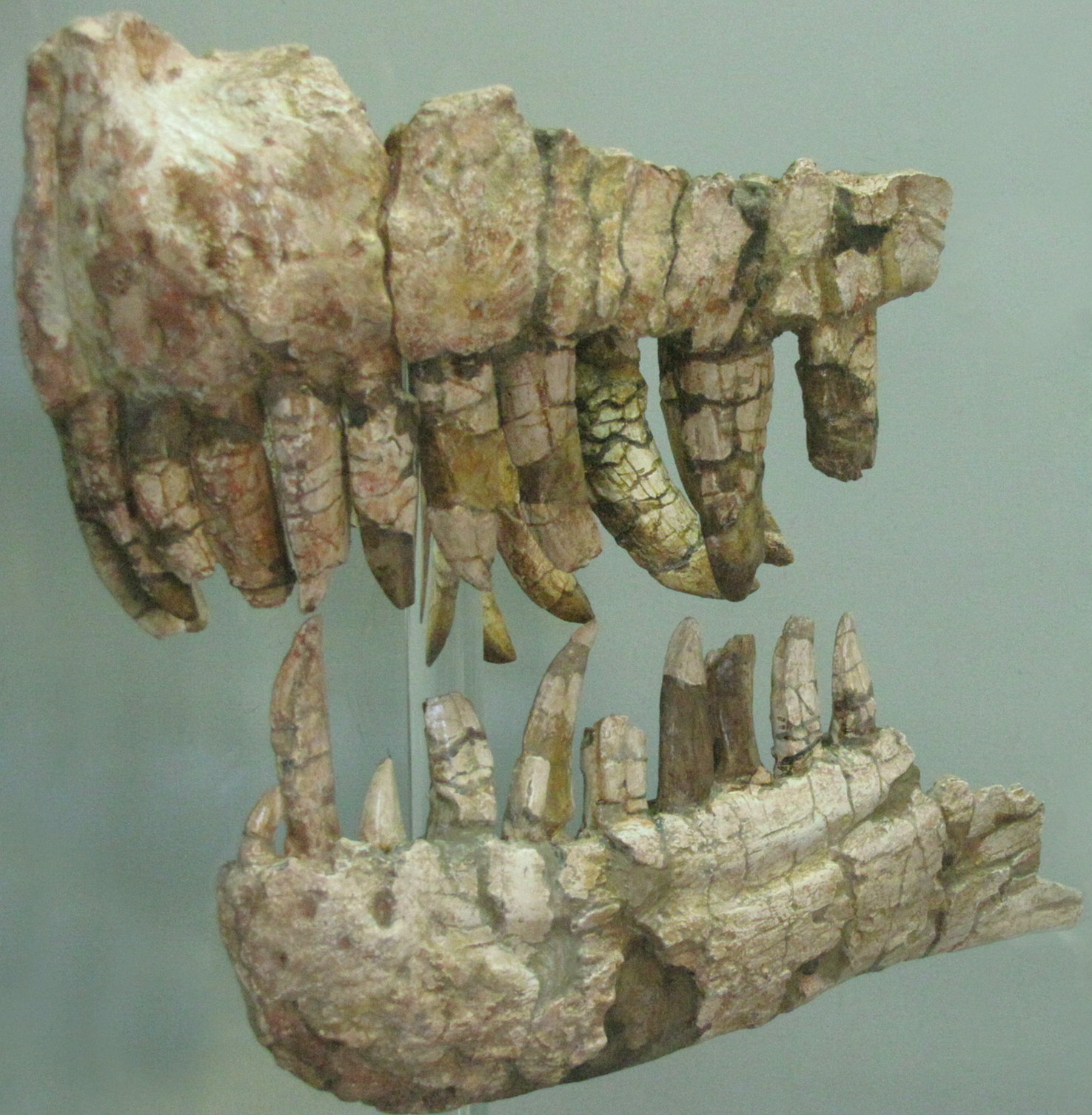
- Genyodectes holotype
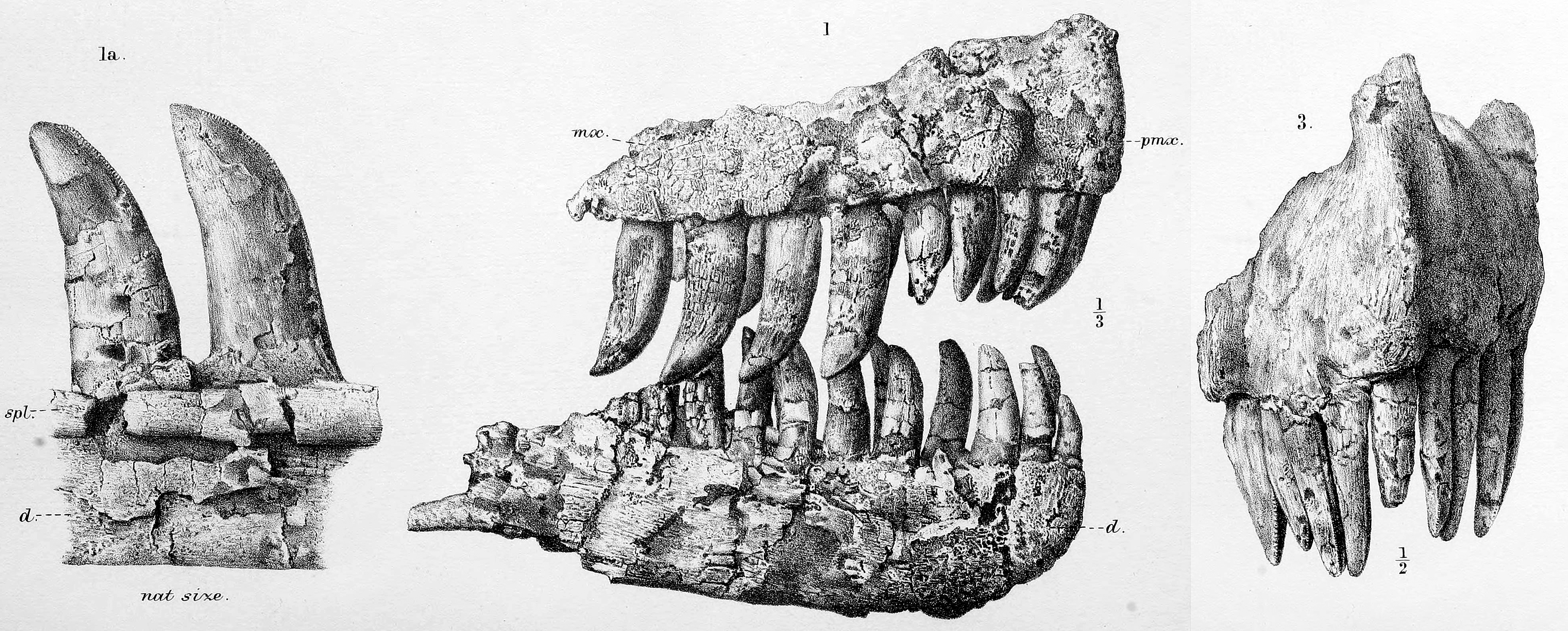
- Illustration from original description

Scientific classification
- Kingdom: Animalia
- Phylum: Chordata
- Class: Reptilia
- Clade: Dinosauria
- Clade: Saurischia
- Clade: Theropoda
- Family: †Ceratosauridae
- Genus: †Genyodectes; Woodward 1901
- Species: †G. serus

Binomial name
- †Genyodectes serus Woodward, 1901

= Genyodectes =

Genyodectes Temporal range: Early Cretaceous, 112 Ma

Extinct genus of dinosaurs

Genyodectes ("jaw bite", from the Greek words genys ("jaw") and dektes ("bite")) is a genus of ceratosaurian theropod dinosaur from the Lower Cretaceous (Aptian) of South America. The holotype material (MLP 26–39, Museo de La Plata, La Plata, Argentina) was collected from the Cerro Barcino Formation, Cañadón Grande, Departamento Paso de Indios in the Chubut Province of Argentina and consists of an incomplete snout, including the premaxillae, portions of both maxillas, the right and left dentary, many teeth, a fragment of the left splenial, and parts of the supradentaries. These elements are generally poorly preserved and some are in articulation. The premaxilla of Genyodectes possesses relatively large and protruding teeth, similar to those of Ceratosaurus. The specific name, serus, means "late". In 2016 it was estimated to be 6.25 meters (20.5 ft) in length and 790 kg (1,740 lb) in weight.

== Taxonomy and phylogeny ==
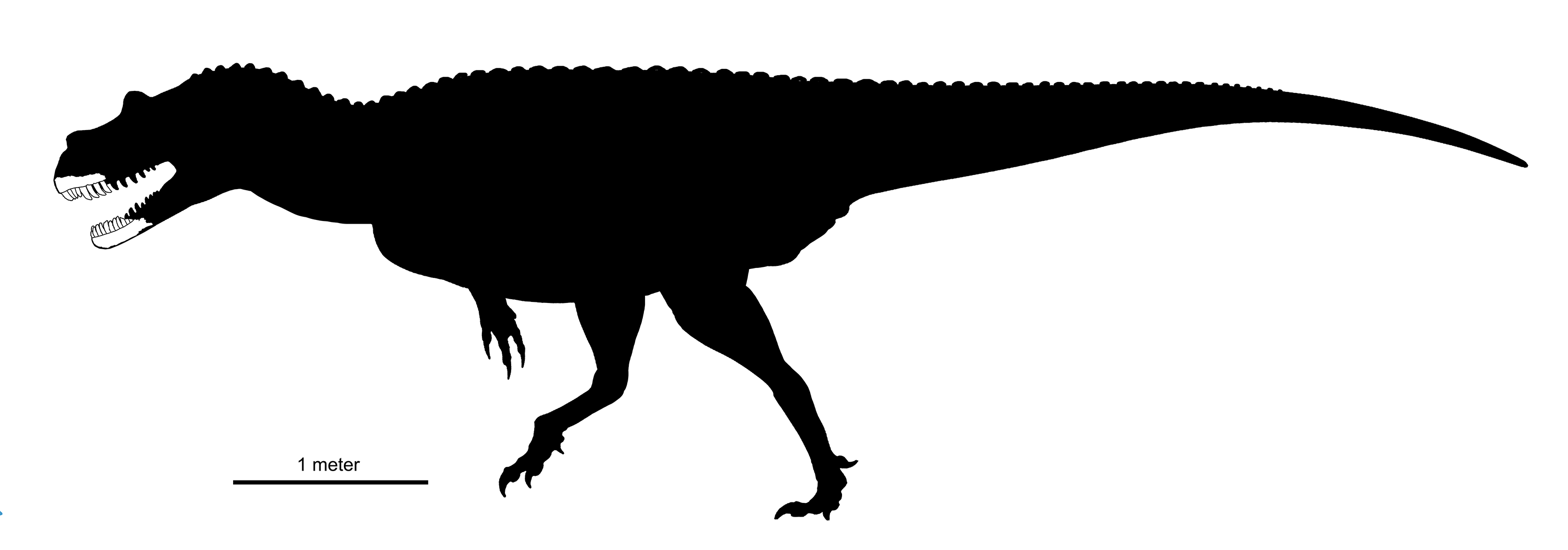
Known material of Genyodectes

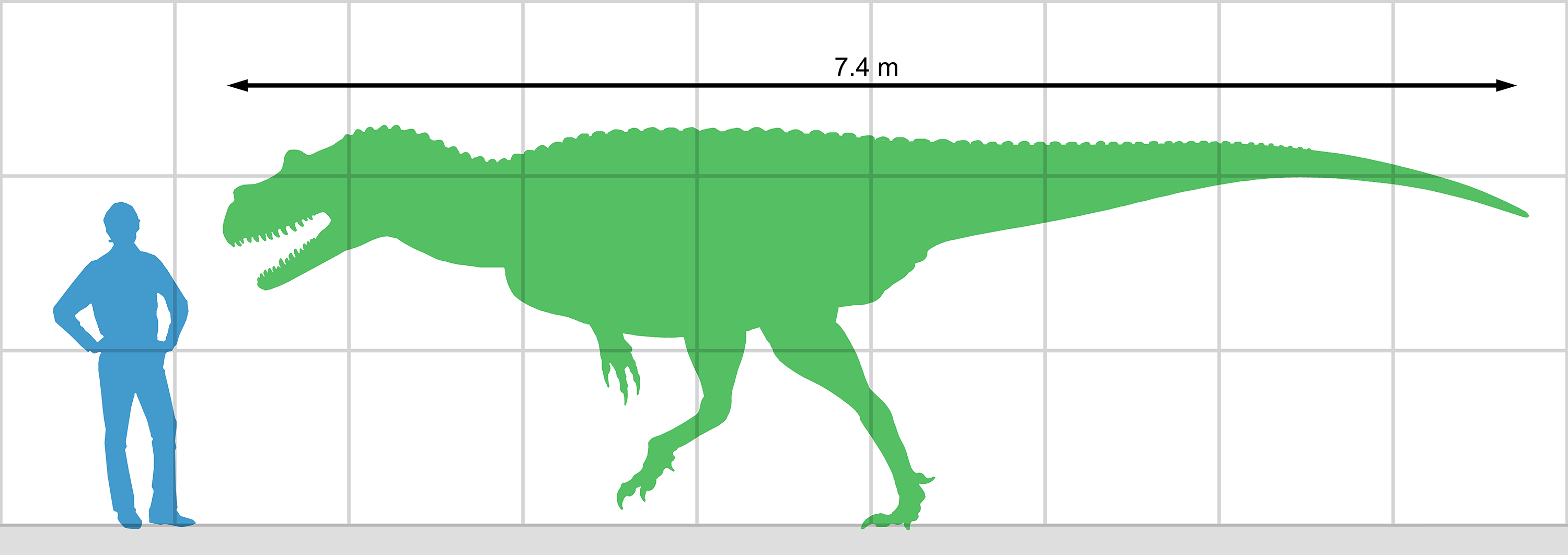
Size comparison with a human

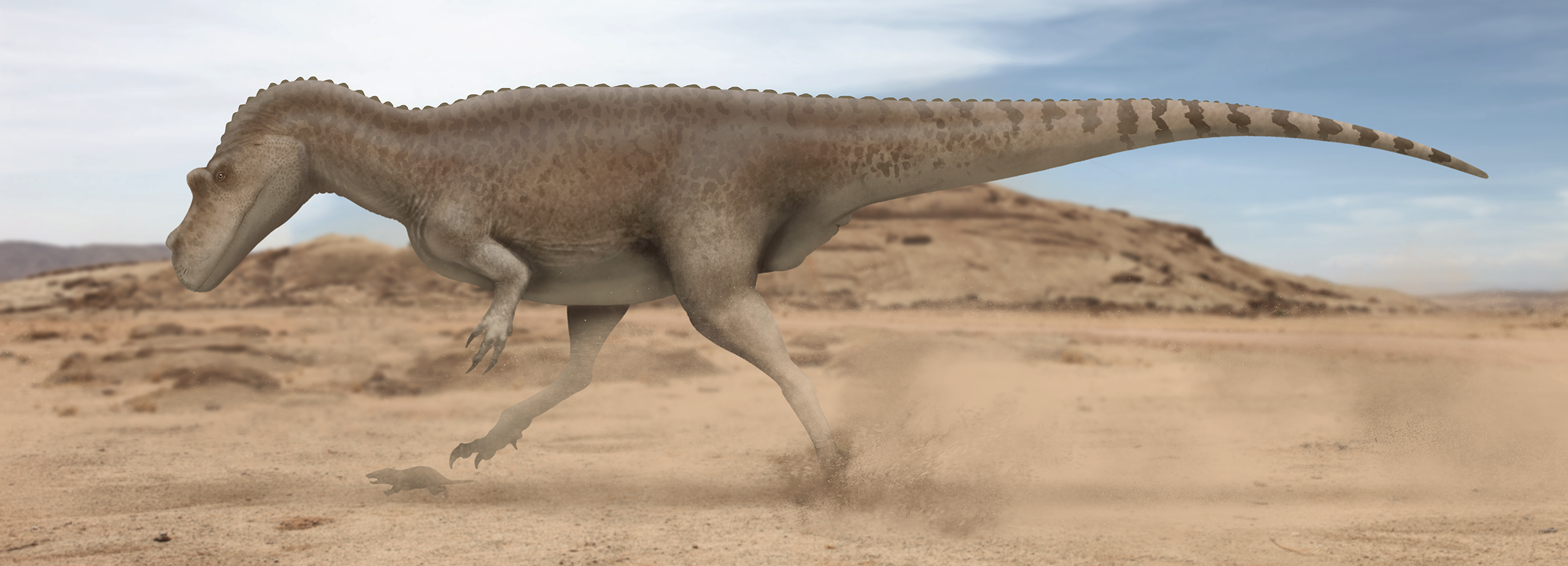
Depicted chasing an early mammal

The taxon has long been considered a nomen dubium, owing to its fragmentary nature and some doubt as to its precise geographic and stratigraphic origins (see Tykoski et Rowe, 2004, p. 50). However, a redescription of the type material by Rauhut (2004) has shed some light on these questions and seems to establish the taxonomic validity of Genyodectes serus, the only species referred to the genus.

English paleontologist Sir Arthur S. Woodward described Genyodectes in 1901, and, after Loncosaurus (Ameghino, 1899; nomen dubium), it is the second non-avian dinosaur described from the South American continent, and it remained the most completely known South American theropod until the 1970s.

Over the last decade, the holotype has been variously referred to as a megalosaurid, a tyrannosaurid, Theropoda incertae sedis, and a possible abelisaurid (perhaps even a senior synonym of Abelisaurus). However, the removal of the holotype from the "artificial matrix" in which it had long been displayed has permitted a reevaluation of the specimen. Rauhut (2004, p. 900) concluded that the specimen lacks important abelisaurid and tyrannosaurid synapomorphies, but found many neoceratosaurian traits. This would seem to imply Genyodectes was closer to Ceratosaurus than the more derived abelisaurs (that also descended from animals like Ceratosaurus). Also, by studying historical records and preservation of the bones, Rauhut (2004, p. 894) concluded that the specimen was likely collected from the Cerro Castaño Member of the Cerro Barcino Formation (Aptian-Albian).

== Diagnosis ==
Rauhut diagnoses Genyodectes serus as follows: "Differs from all theropods with the possible exception of Ceratosaurus in that the premaxillary teeth are arranged in an overlapping en-echelon pattern and the longest maxillary tooth crowns are longer apicobasally than the minimal dorsoventral depth of the mandible. Differs from Ceratosaurus in the presence of four, as opposed to three, premaxillary teeth."
