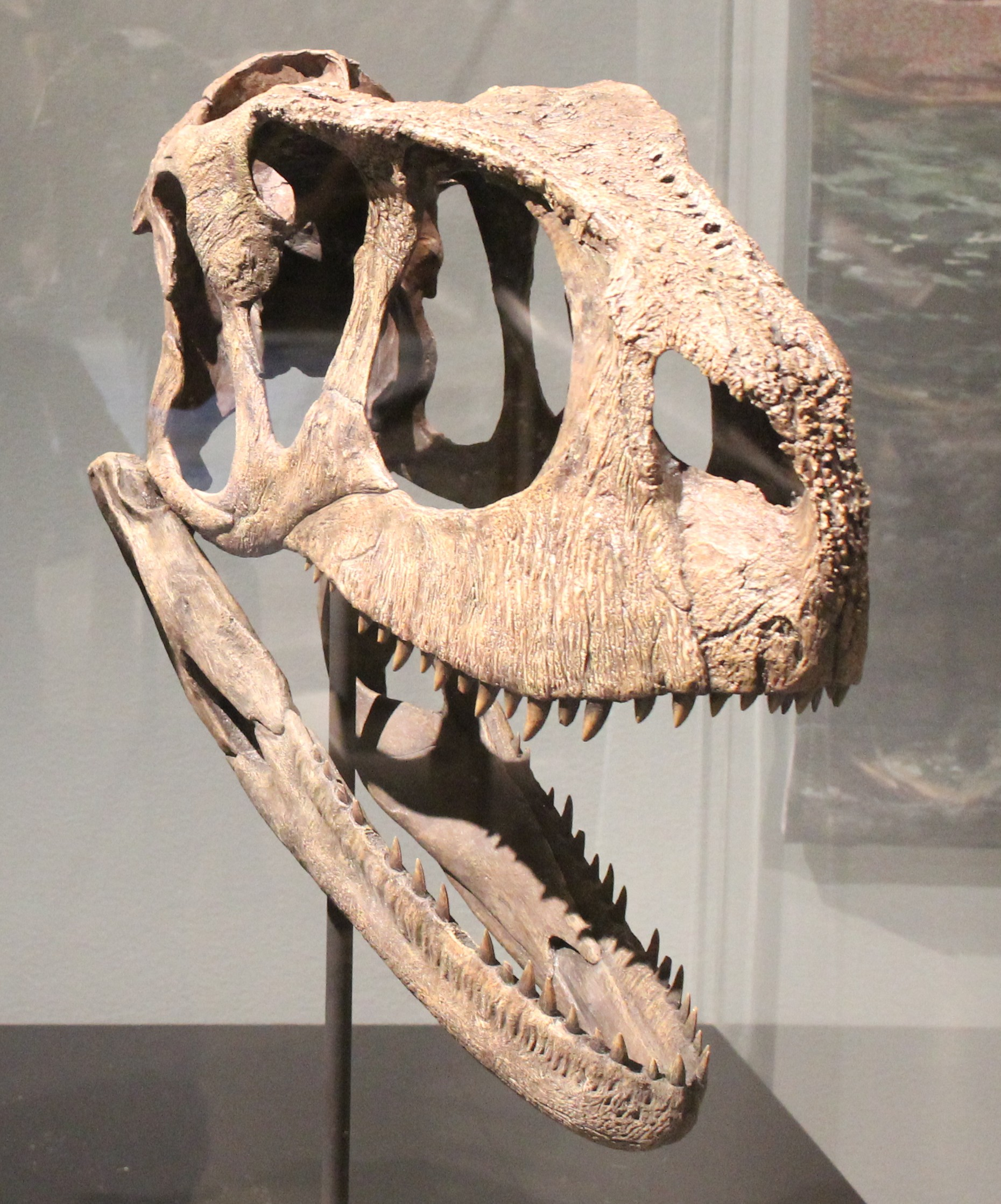
- Restored skull

Scientific classification
- Kingdom: Animalia
- Phylum: Chordata
- Class: Reptilia
- Clade: Dinosauria
- Clade: Saurischia
- Clade: Theropoda
- Family: †Abelisauridae
- Genus: †Rugops; Sereno et al. 2004
- Species: †R. primus

Binomial name
- †Rugops primus Sereno et al. 2004

= Rugops =

Rugops Temporal range: Late Cretaceous, 95 Ma

Extinct genus of theropod dinosaurs

Rugops (meaning 'wrinkle face') is a monospecific genus of basal abelisaurid theropod dinosaur that lived during the Late Cretaceous period (Cenomanian stage, approximately 95 million years ago) in what is now the Echkar Formation in Niger. The type and only species, Rugops primus, is known only from a partial skull. It was named and described in 2004 by Paul Sereno, Jeffery Wilson and Jack Conrad. Rugops has an estimated length of 4.4–5.3 metres (14–17 ft) and weight of 410 kilograms (900 lb). The top of its skull bears several pits which correlates with overlaying scale and the front of the snout would have had an armour-like dermis.

== Discovery and naming ==
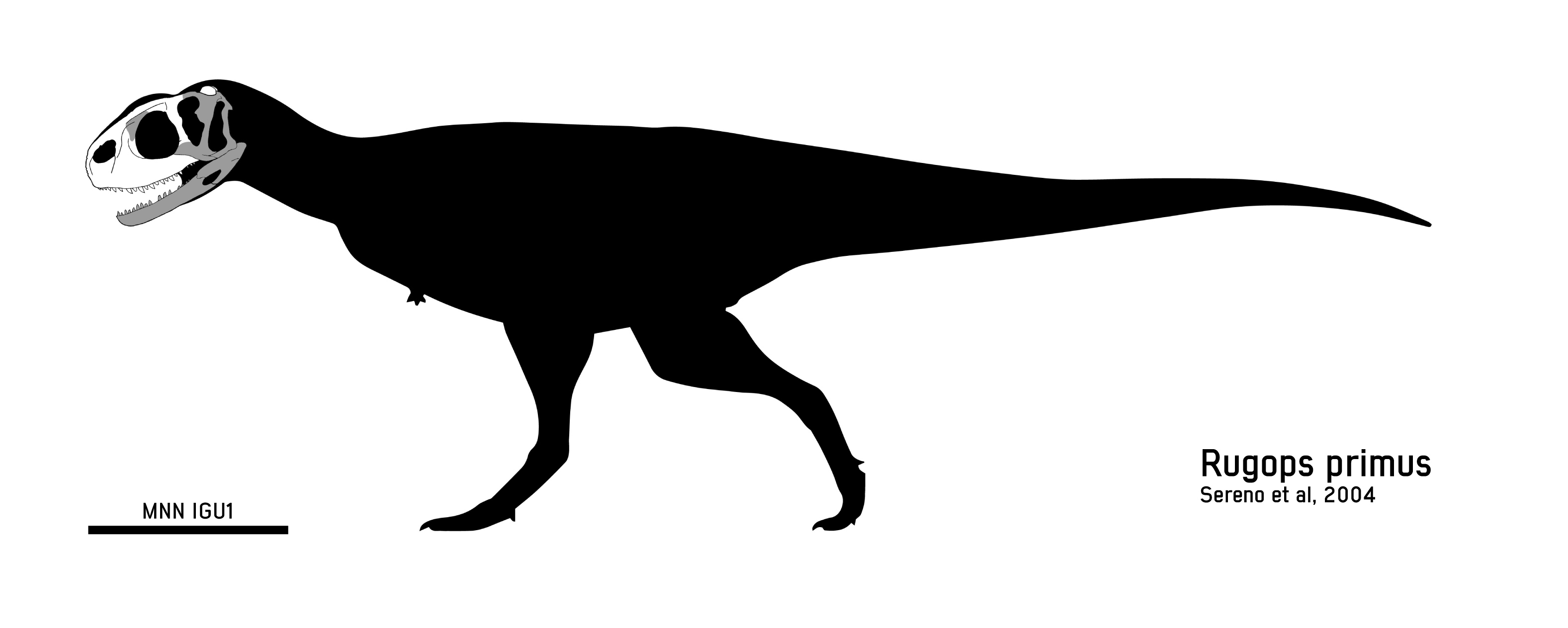
Skeletal diagram of the holotype and only known specimen: MNN IGU1

In 2000, an expedition conducted by the University of Chicago led by American paleontologist Paul Sereno and funded by the National Geographic Society explored fossiliferous sandstone outcrops in a site near In-Abangharit on the western edge of the Ténéré Desert of Niger. These layers belong to the Echkar Formation, which dates to the Cenomanian age of the Late Cretaceous period, around 96 million years ago. During the expedition, a partial skull of a theropod was collected. This skull was then transported to the University of Chicago for study and preparation before being returned to the Musee National du Niger and deposited under the catalog number MNN IGU1. The specimen consists of a partial skull which lacks portions of the palate and skull roof. The type specimen may represent a subadult individual based on its small size, the lack of fusion between the nasals and the presence of the fenestra between the prefrontal, frontal, postorbital and lacrimal bones.

In 2004, this skull was described by American researchers Paul Sereno, Jeffrey Wilson, and Jack Conrad as the holotype (name-bearing) specimen of a new genus and species of abelisaurid, named Rugops primus. The generic name, Rugops, is derived from the Latin word "ruga" (wrinkle) and the Greek word "opsi" (face). The specific name is derived from the Latin word "primus" (first). Both the generic and specific name refer to Rugops as being one of the earliest abelisaurids with a textured skull.

In 2005, a partial right maxilla of an abelisaurid was described from the Kem Kem Group of Morocco. The maxilla shares some similarities with Rugops such as with the morphology of the teeth, the shape of the alveolar, the rugose texture on the lateral sides, the straight border with the premaxilla, and the position of the palatal shelf. However, the maxilla cannot be referred to Rugops as the diagnostic features of the genus are located on different parts of the skull.

== Description ==
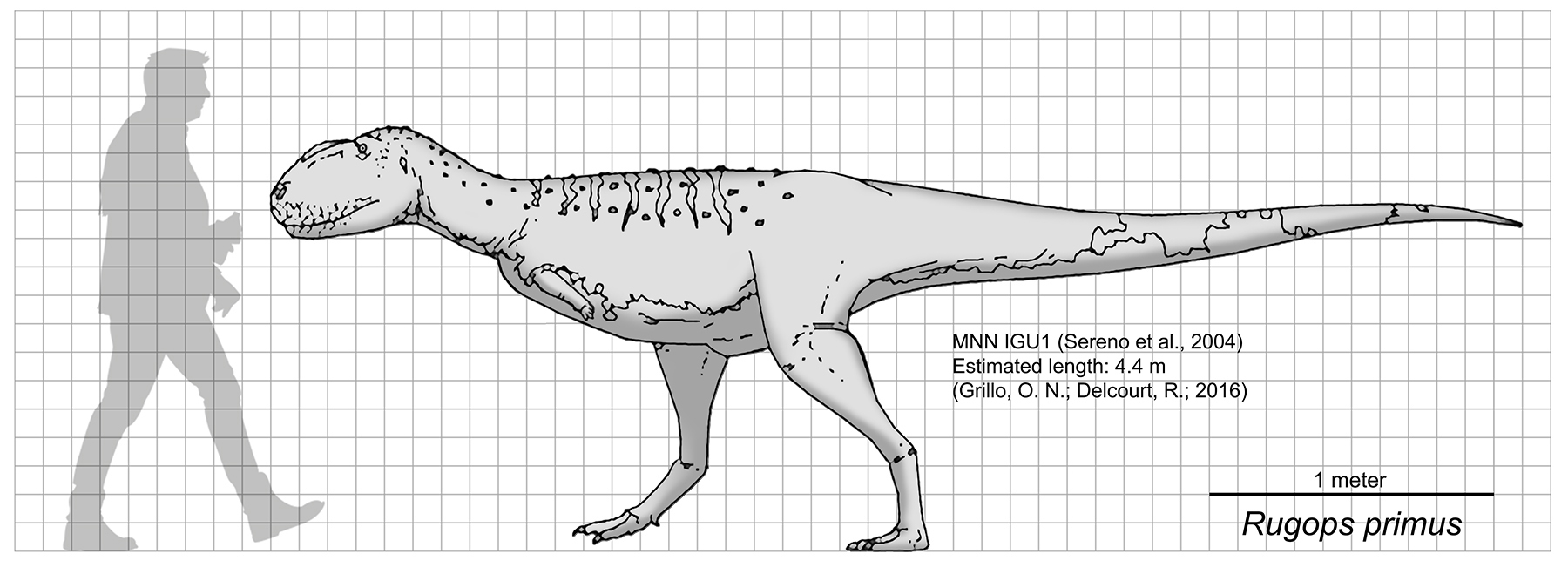
Size compared to a human

In 2010, Paul gave Rugops an estimated length of 6 metres (20 ft) and weight of 750 kilograms (1,650 lb). However, Grillo & Delcourt (2016) gave a lower estimate of 4.4 metres (14 ft) long while Molina-Pérez & Larramendi (2016) gave an estimate of 5.3 metres (17 ft) long and 410 kilograms (900 lb) in weight.

=== Skull ===
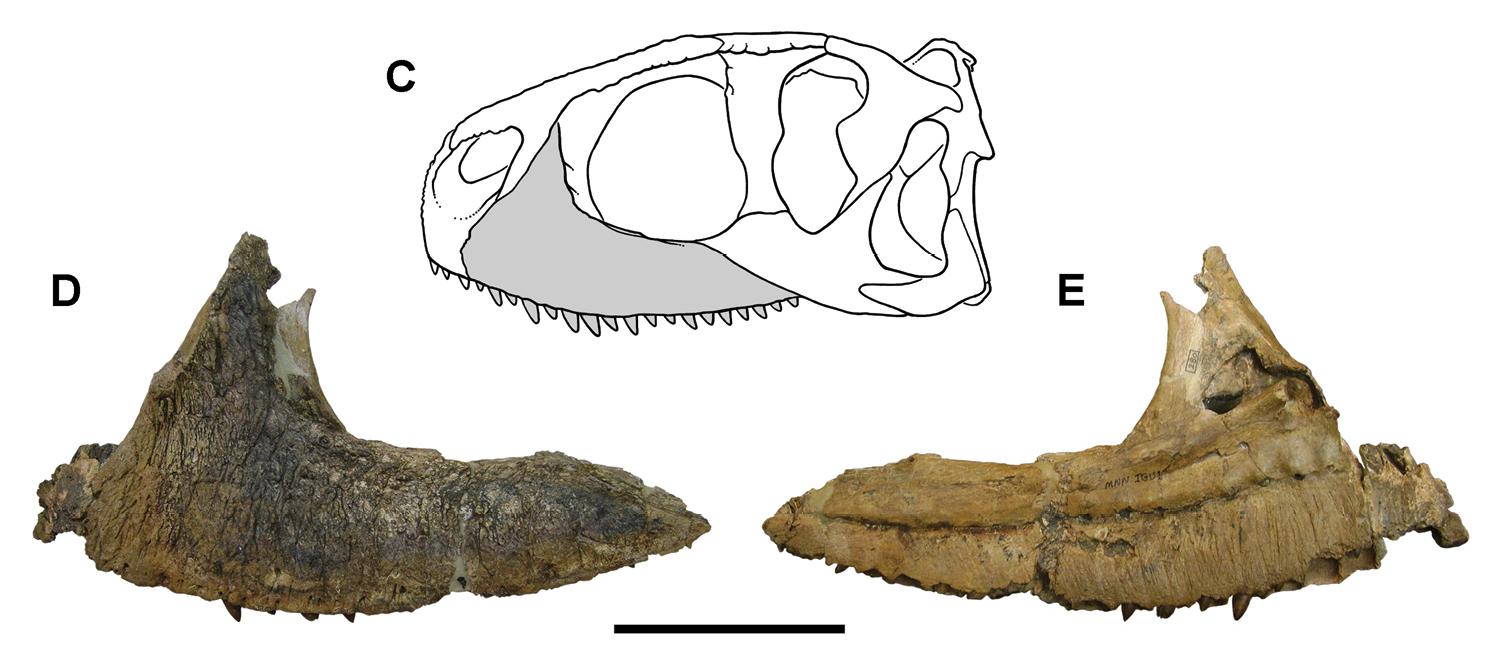
Skull diagram and holotype maxilla

The skull length of Rugops was about 31.5 centimetres (12.4 in). As in other abelisaurids, the skull of Rugops has an external surface that is textured, a dental arcade that is U-shaped, maxillary-jugal contact that is broad, the presence of a socket on the maxilla and alveoli that are subrectangular in shape. The orbital brow is present on the skull, although it is not fully formed. Many of the bones that make up the skull have slender proportions. In addition, the skull also has relatively thin nasals and skull fenestrae that are proportionally large. The upper surface of each nasal bone has a row of several depressions with grooves for vascular supply going into them. A similar condition is seen in Carnotaurus, although the upper surface of the nasals is convex unlike Rugops, as it is concave. Sereno et al. (2004) suggested that the depressions on the dorsal surface of each nasal anchored either sensory structures or soft tissues for display. Delcourt (2018), however, interpreted that they correlate with overlying scales, as seen in extant reptiles such as crocodiles and lizards. The anterior-most snout has a papillate texture which indicates the presence of an armour-like dermis. The author suggested that, based on the type specimen probably being a subadult individual, the armour-like dermis may have reached a larger surface as it grew to which it developed a more papillate texture. Delcourt (2018) also proposed that the armour-like dermis may correlate with a low-motion headbutting behaviour, as seen in marine iguanas.

A maxilla (NPSJB-PV247) from Patagonia shows similarities with Rugops as the pattern of external ornamentation is nearly identical and the internal details are also have a close similarity. In Rugops, the interdenticular sulci of the denticles, the presence of which might possible be a synapomorphic characteristic of Abelisauridae, is absent and has a higher dental formulae than in any other abelisaurid. The nasal sculpturing of Rugops is similar to the ornamentation seen in Skorpiovenator as the surface of the nasals show hummocky-like rugosities and has grooves that lead into each foramen. However, unlike Skorpiovenator, Rugops lacks extra foramina on the skull roof that could represent homologues. The external morphology of the nasals are similar to that of Skorpiovenator as they share a similar foramina pattern. The ventral surface of the nasals have a series of foramina, which has been suggested to connect to an internal system.

The describing authors indicated two distinguishing traits. Both of these are autapomorphies, unique derived characters. The skull roof has small fenestra that are present between the prefrontal, frontal, post-orbital and lacrimal. The dorsal surface of each nasal has a row of seven small depressions.

== Classification ==
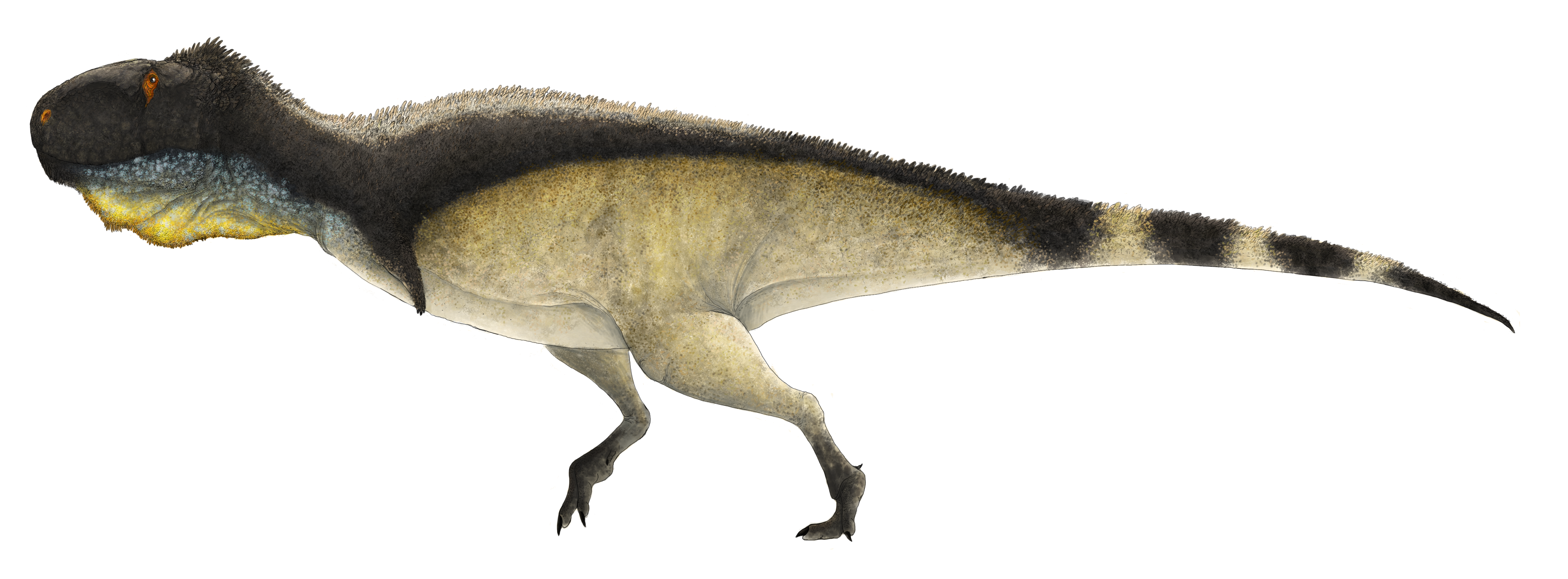
Speculative life restoration

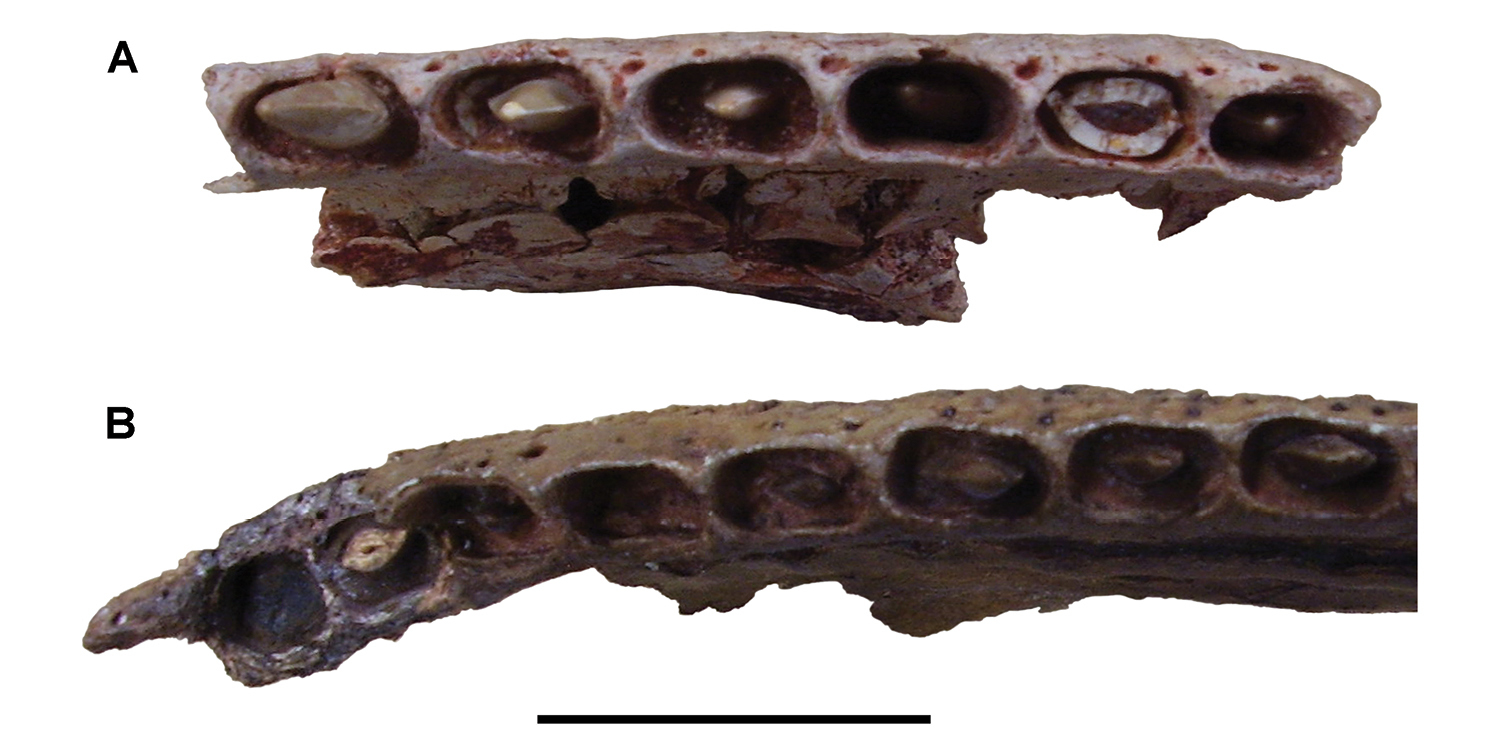
Maxilla of Rugops (B) compared to that of a similar but indeterminate abelisaurid from Morocco (A)

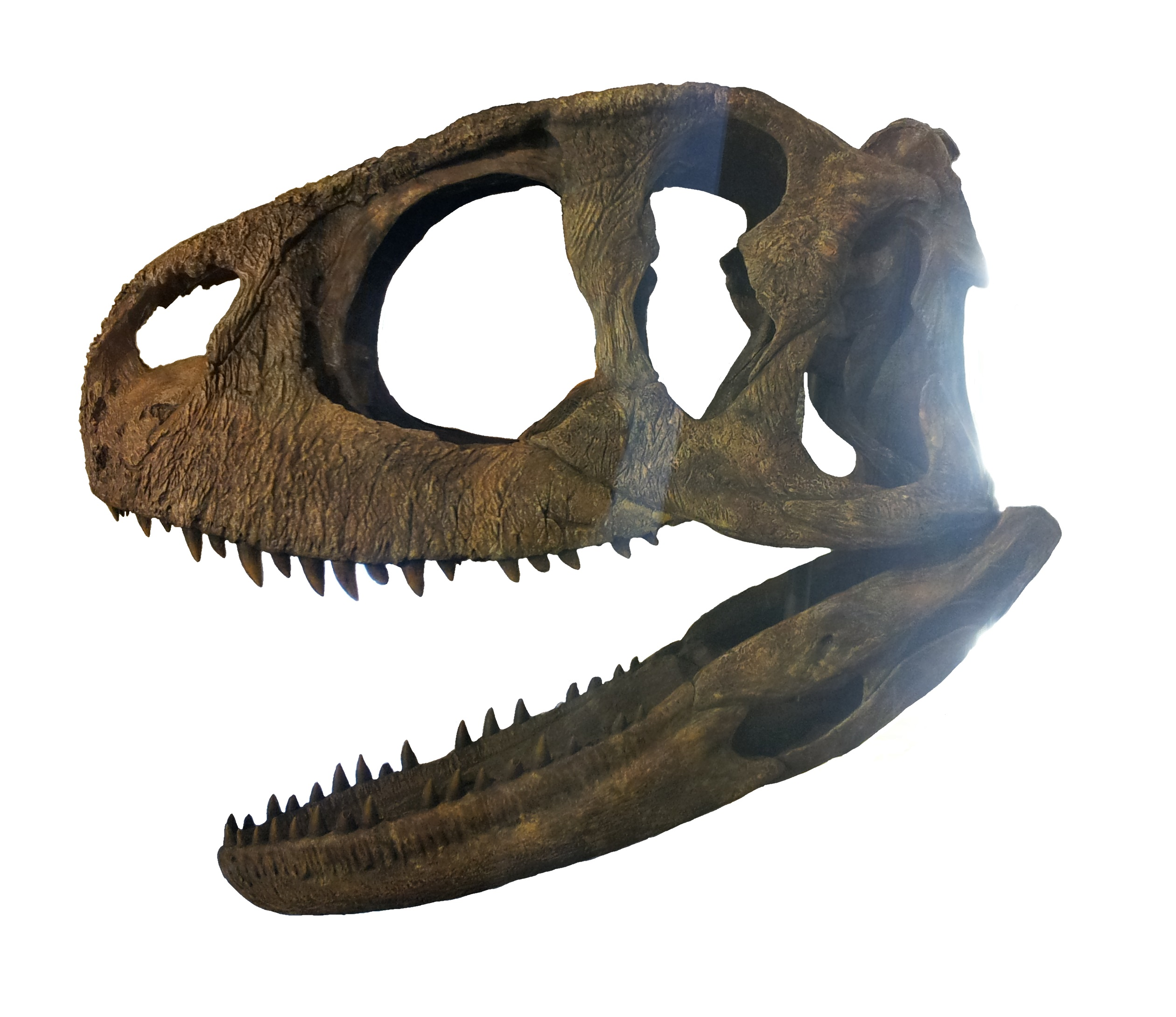
Reconstructed skull

Sereno et al. (2004) initially found Rugops to be the basalmost abelisaurid, a position also recovered by various analyses by Egli et al. (2016), Delcourt (2018), Cerroni et al. (2020) and Rolando et al. (2020). However, Rugops has also been recovered as being more derived than Rahiolisaurus and/or Eoabelisaurus but more basal than other abelisaurids by Pol & Rauhut (2012), Rauhut & Carrano (2016), and Iori et al. (2021). Other alternative positions include Rugops being more derived than Kryptops, Chenanisaurus and/or Spectrovenator as recovered by Sereno & Brusatte (2008), Zaher et al. (2020), Gianechini et al. (2021) and Agnolín et al. (2022), and within a polytomy with other abelisaurids such as Xenotarsosaurus, Tarascosaurus, Ilokelesia and Genusaurus which has been recovered by Tortosa et al. (2014), Baiano et al. (2020) and Salem et al. (2022).

A phylogenetic analysis conducted by Zaher et al. (2020) is reproduced below.

- Abelisauridae
  - Eoabelisaurus
  - - Spectrovenator
    - - Rugops
      - - Arcovenator
        - Rajasaurus
        - Majungasaurus
        - Indosaurus
        - Abelisaurus
        - Brachyrostra
          - - Skorpiovenator
            - - Ekrixinatosaurus
              - Ilokelesia
          - Carnotaurini
            - Dahalokely
            - Carnotaurus
            - Aucasaurus
            - Rahiolisaurus

The results of an earlier analysis by Pol & Rauhut (2012) are reproduced below.

- Ceratosauria
  - Berberosaurus
  - Deltadromeus
  - - - Spinostropheus
      - - Limusaurus
        - Elaphrosaurus
    - Neoceratosauria
      - Ceratosauridae
        - Ceratosaurus
        - Genyodectes
      - Abelisauroidea
        - Noasauridae
          - Laevisuchus
          - Masiakasaurus
          - Noasaurus
          - Velocisaurus
        - Abelisauridae
          - Eoabelisaurus
          - - Rugops
            - - Abelisaurus
              - Carnotaurinae
                - - Majungasaurus
                  - Indosaurus
                  - Rajasaurus
                - Brachyrostra
                  - - Ilokelesia
                    - Ekrixinatosaurus
                    - Skorpiovenator
                  - Carnotaurini
                    - Carnotaurus
                    - Aucasaurus

== Paleoecology ==
Rugops is known from the Echkar Formation, the uppermost lithostratigraphic unit of the Tegama Group. The Tegama Group includes two other fossils formations; the Elrhaz Formation and the Farak Formation. The Echkar Formation outcrops themselves are located south of Mount Echkar, the namesake of the formation, in Iguidi in the western Sahara Desert. The Echkar Formation consists of sandstone outcrops, some of which are red, exposed between migrating sand dunes. The sediments of these sandstones are largely sandy with some clayey or calcareous intercalations. As for the environment itself, the Echkar Formation is a fluvial and lacustrine deposit which occurred in a humid or semi-arid conditions. The exact age of the Echkar Formation is debated, with some authors arguing that it is lower Cenomanian in age, which would place it around 95 million years old, or upper Albian in age, which would place it around 100 million years old.

Rugops lived alongside several other dinosaurs. These included other theropods, such as the carcharodontosaurid Carcharodontosaurus iguidensis (which may be from another genus) and the spinosaurid Spinosaurus. As for sauropods, an unnamed rebbachisaurid and an unnamed titanosaur are known from the formation.

== See also ==
- Timeline of ceratosaur research
- 2004 in paleontology
