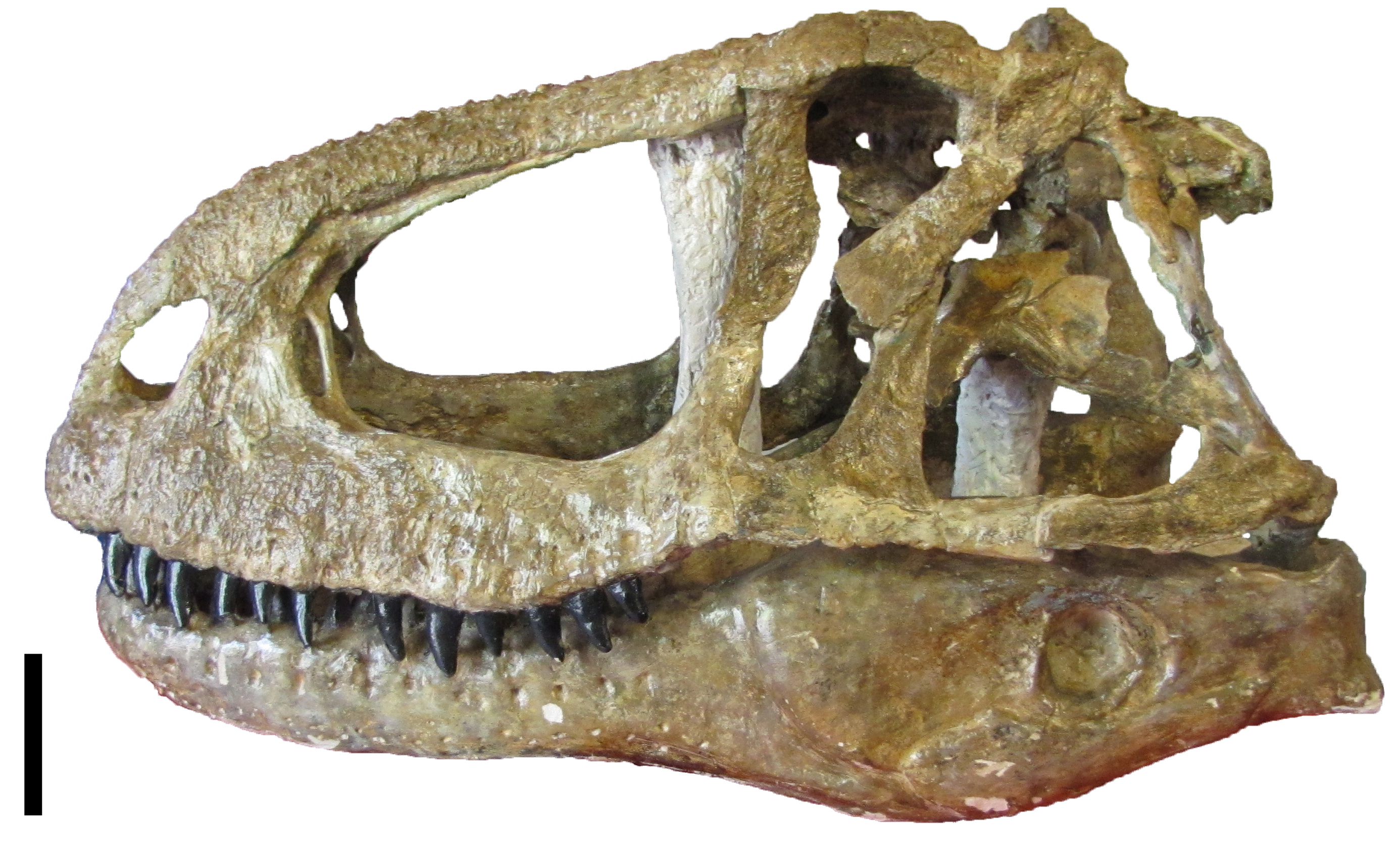
- Reconstruction of the Abelisaurus skull with original bones of the holotype. Scale = 10 cm

Scientific classification
- Kingdom: Animalia
- Phylum: Chordata
- Clade: Dinosauria
- Clade: Saurischia
- Clade: Theropoda
- Family: †Abelisauridae
- Clade: †Furileusauria
- Tribe: †Carnotaurini
- Genus: †Abelisaurus; Bonaparte & Novas, 1985

Type species
- †Abelisaurus comahuensis Bonaparte & Novas, 1985

Synonyms
- Aucasaurus garridoi? Coria et al., 2002

= Abelisaurus =

Abelisaurus Temporal range: Campanian, 80 Ma

Extinct genus of dinosaurs

Abelisaurus (/əˌbɛlɪˈsɔːrəs/; "Abel's lizard") is a genus of predatory abelisaurid theropod dinosaur which lived during the Late Cretaceous Period (Campanian) of what is now South America. It was a bipedal carnivore that probably reached about 7.4 metres (24 ft 3 in) in length, although this is uncertain as it is known from only one partial skull.

== Discovery and naming ==
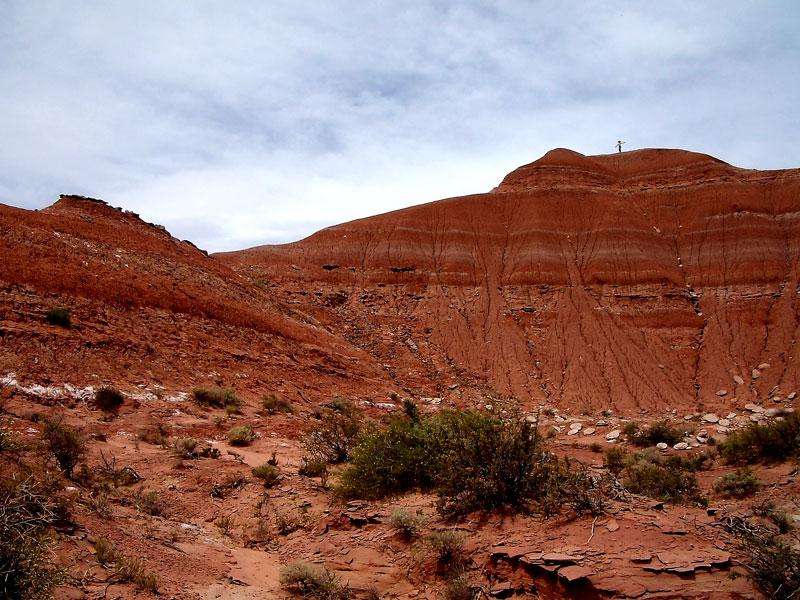
The Anacleto Formation where Abelisaurus remains have been found

Coining the type species Abelisaurus comahuensis, both genus and species were named and described by Argentine paleontologists José Bonaparte and Fernando Emilio Novas in 1985. The generic name recognizes Roberto Abel as the discoverer of the type specimen, and also as the former director of the provincial Museum of Cipolletti in Argentina, where the specimen is housed. It also incorporates the Greek σαυρος (sauros), meaning 'lizard'. The specific name comahuensis honors the Comahue region of Argentina, where the fossil was found.

The holotype, MC 11098, was in 1983 uncovered at the "Cantera de la Pala Mécanica"-site in the Lago Pellegrini quarries exploited by Abel since 1975. This single known fossil of Abelisaurus consists of a skull, lacking the lower jaws, that is incomplete, especially on the right side. Most of the connections between the snout and the back of the skull are absent. It is also missing most of the palate (roof of the mouth). Despite the missing pieces, it could be estimated at over 85 centimetres (33 in) long.

Abelisaurus is one of the many dinosaurs that have been discovered in Patagonia. It was originally described as coming from the Allen Formation but subsequent research proved the remains were actually found in the older Anacleto Formation (part of the Neuquén Group) of Río Negro Province, Argentina. However, locally Abelisaurus is known to have come from the Sr. Fernandez field, which is in the Campanian Allen Formation, which makes its stratigraphic position unclear. The Anacleto is a geologic formation in South America, dating from the early Campanian stage of the Late Cretaceous Period, between 83 and 80 million years ago.

In 2009, Novas suggested that Aucasaurus garridoi might be a junior synonym of Abelisaurus comahuensis. In 2010, Gregory S. Paul renamed Aucasaurus garridoi into Abelisaurus garridoi. This has found no acceptance.

== Description ==
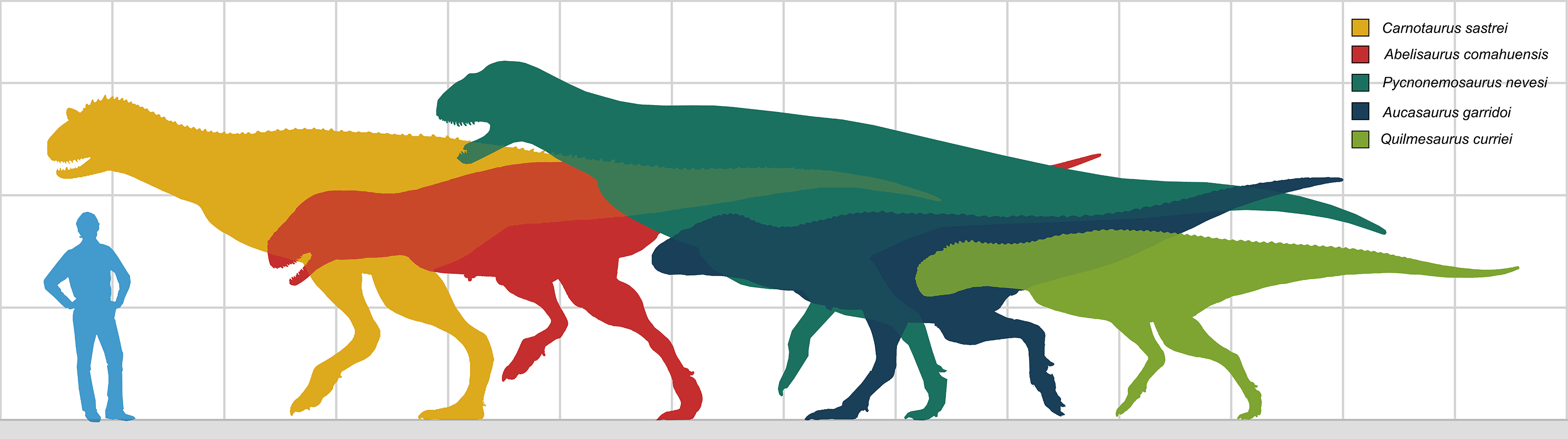
Size comparison of Abelisaurus (red) with other carnotaurins

As only the skull is known, it has proven difficult to provide a reliable size estimate of Abelisaurus. It has transpired that abelisaurids have relatively short heads. In 2010, Gregory S. Paul estimated its body length at ten metres (32 ft 10 in), its weight at 3 tonnes (3 long tons; 3 short tons). In 2012 Thomas Holtz gave a possible length of 11 metres (36.3 feet). In 2016, its length was estimated to be 7.4 metres (24 ft 3 in) in a comprehensive analysis of abelisaur size. Others authors gave a similar size at 7.2 metres (23.6 feet) and 1.65 tonnes (1.82 short tons).

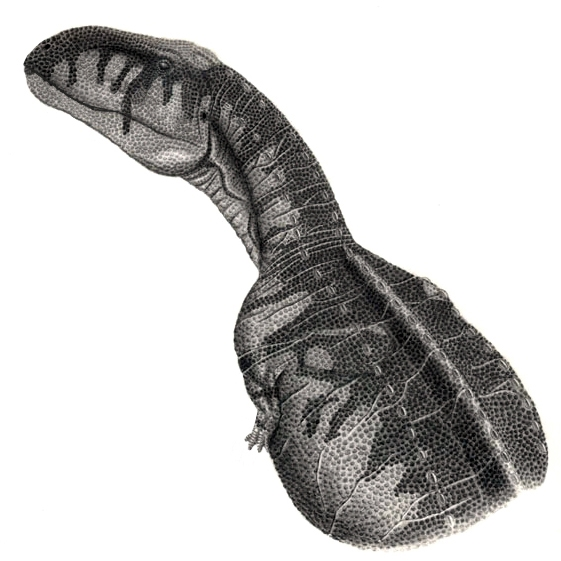
Life restoration

Skull length was estimated at 85 centimetres (33 1/2 in) in 1985. The skull is relatively deep. Although there are no bony crests or horns, like those found in some other abelisaurids, such as Carnotaurus, rough ridges on the snout and above the eyes might have supported some kind of crest made out of keratin, which would not have become fossilized. The skull roof is thickened. There are also very large fenestrae (window-like openings) in the skull, which are found in many dinosaurs and reduce skull weight. One of these is a large triangular antorbital fenestra in the side of the snout. The eye socket behind it is rather high. It is constricted in the middle by bony projections of the lacrimal bone in the front and the postorbital bone at the rear. The eye was located above the constriction. Behind the eye socket a large triangular infratemporal fenestra is present. Its form reflects a strong forward inclination of the back of the skull.

The front snout bone, the premaxilla, bore four relatively small teeth. The maxilla behind it had at least seven, but perhaps as many as thirteen, larger teeth.

== Classification ==
Bonaparte and Novas placed Abelisaurus in the newly created family Abelisauridae in 1985. They thought it was a member of the Carnosauria. Abelisaurus was the first abelisaurid named.

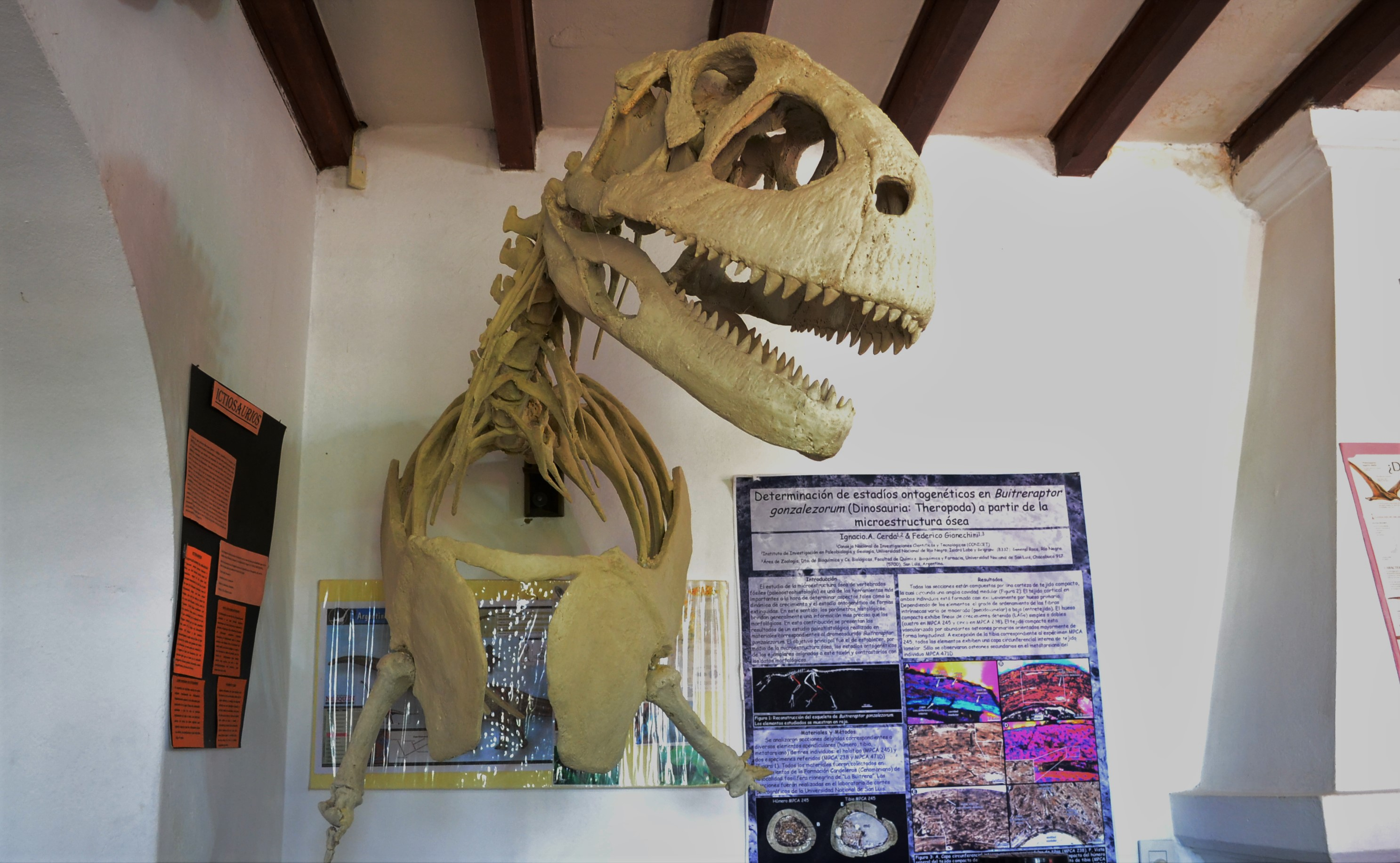
Reconstructed upper-body skeleton, Museo Provincial Carlos Ameghino

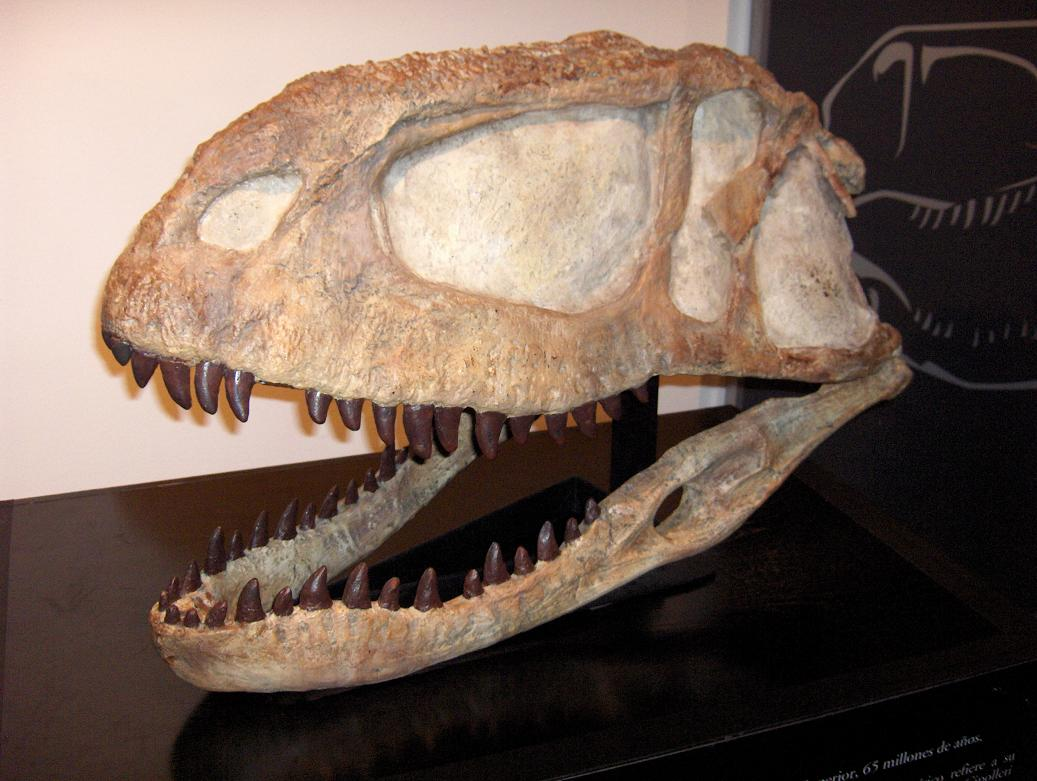
Reconstructed skull in semi-profile

Many other abelisaurids have since been discovered, including much more complete specimens of Aucasaurus, Carnotaurus and Majungasaurus. They showed that abelisaurids were not carnosaurs in the modern sense, but belonged to the Neoceratosauria instead. Some scientists place Abelisaurus as a basal abelisaurid, outside the subfamily Carnotaurinae. Others are less certain of its position. Abelisaurus shares some skull features, such as a relative elongation, with the carcharodontosaurids, a group unrelated to other species assigned to the Abelisauridae, and, since it is known only from a skull, it has been suggested that future discoveries may show that Abelisaurus was in fact a carcharodontosaurid. However, this is thought unlikely.

In their description of the abelisaurid Llukalkan, Federico Gianechini and colleagues performed a phylogenetic analysis to test the affinities of the new taxon. The simplified strict consensus tree of the analysis is shown below.

- Abelisauridae
  - Kryptops
  - - Rugops
    - - Majungasaurinae
        - - Genusaurus
          - Arcovenator
        - - Rajasaurus
          - Indosaurus
          - Majungasaurus
      - Brachyrostra
        - Xenotarsosaurus
        - - - Dahalokely
            - Rahiolisaurus
          - - - Ilokelesia
              - - Ekrixinatosaurus
                - Skorpiovenator
            - Furileusauria
              - Llukalkan
              - Pycnonemosaurus
              - Quilmesaurus
              - Viavenator
              - Carnotaurini
                - Carnotaurus
                - - Aucasaurus
                  - Abelisaurus

== Paleobiology ==
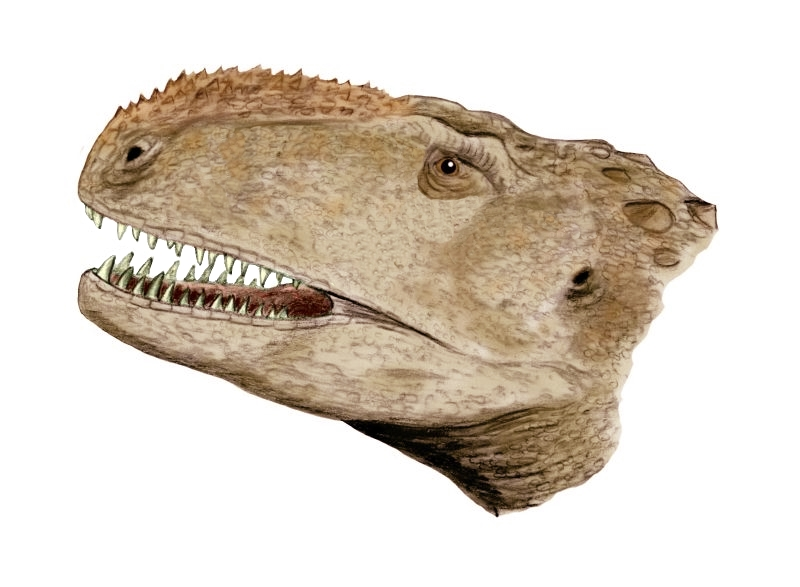
Restoration of the head

As the skull of Abelisaurus was relatively broad at the back, Bonaparte and Novas drew a comparison between the newly described species and the also wide-skulled Tyrannosauridae. They assumed that, just as tyrannosaurids, Abelisaurus were the apex predators of their ecosystem.

In 2010, Paul proposed that Abelisaurus hunted titanosaurian sauropods, such as Antarctosaurus, Pellegrinisaurus, Barrosasaurus and Neuquensaurus.

== See also ==
- Timeline of ceratosaur research
