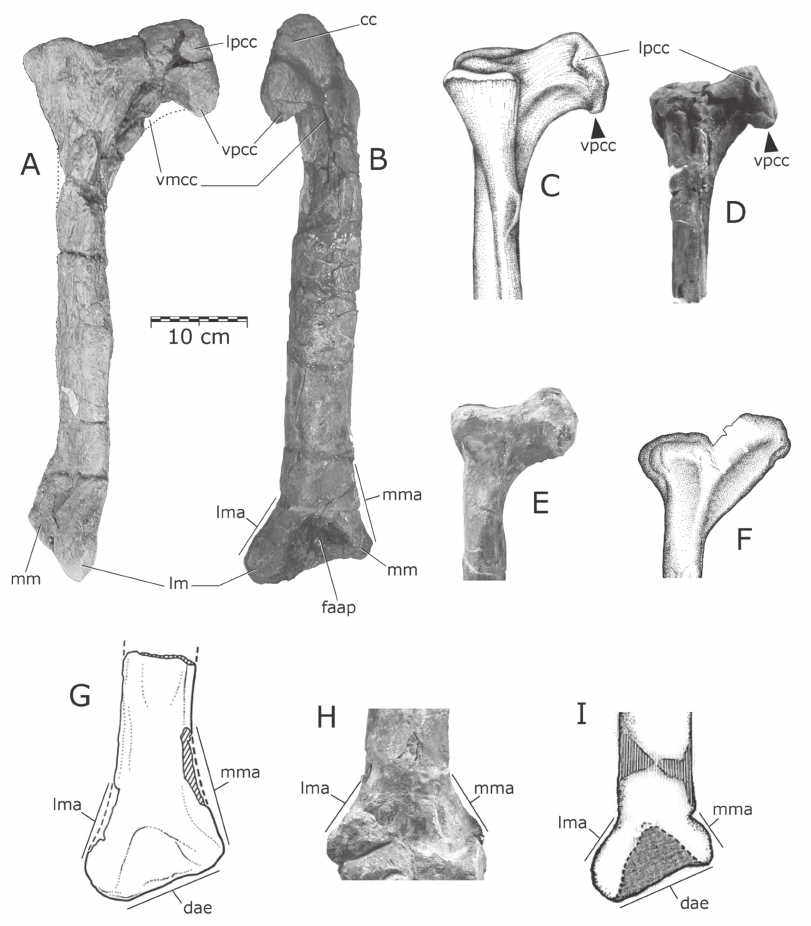
- The tibia of Quilmesaurus (A-B) compared to that of other abelisaurids

Scientific classification
- Kingdom: Animalia
- Phylum: Chordata
- Class: Reptilia
- Clade: Dinosauria
- Clade: Saurischia
- Clade: Theropoda
- Family: †Abelisauridae
- Clade: †Furileusauria
- Tribe: †Carnotaurini
- Genus: †Quilmesaurus; Coria, 2001

Type species
- †Quilmesaurus curriei Coria, 2001

= Quilmesaurus =

Quilmesaurus Temporal range: Late Cretaceous, 75–66 Ma

Extinct genus of dinosaurs

Quilmesaurus is a genus of carnivorous theropod dinosaur from the Upper Cretaceous (Campanian to Maastrichtian stages) Allen Formation of Argentina. It was a member of Abelisauridae, closely related to genera such as Carnotaurus. The only known remains of this genus are leg bones which share certain similarities to a variety of abelisaurids. However, these bones lack unique features, which may render Quilmesaurus a nomen vanum (more commonly known as a nomen dubium, or "dubious name").

== Discovery and naming ==
Skeletal diagram

During the late 1980s, a field crew from the Universidad Nacional Tucumán, led by Jaime Powell, uncovered forty kilometres south of Roca City, in Río Negro province, southern Argentina, the remains of a theropod near the Salitral Ojo de Agua. In 2001, Rodolfo Aníbal Coria named and described the type species Quilmesaurus curriei. The genus name is derived from the Quilmes, a Native American people, and the specific name honours Dr. Philip John Currie, a Canadian theropod specialist.

The holotype and currently only specimen was designated the collection number MPCA-PV-100, in the Museo Provincial "Carlos Ameghino". It consists of the distal (lower or outermost) half of the right femur (thighbone), and a complete right tibia (inner shinbone), collected from the Allen Formation of the Malargüe Group in the Neuquén Basin. These deposits date from the Campanian to Maastrichtian. The specimen came from the fluvial sandstones at the bottom of the Allen Formation. The taxon is notable as it represents one of the youngest records of a non-avian theropod from Patagonia.

== Description ==
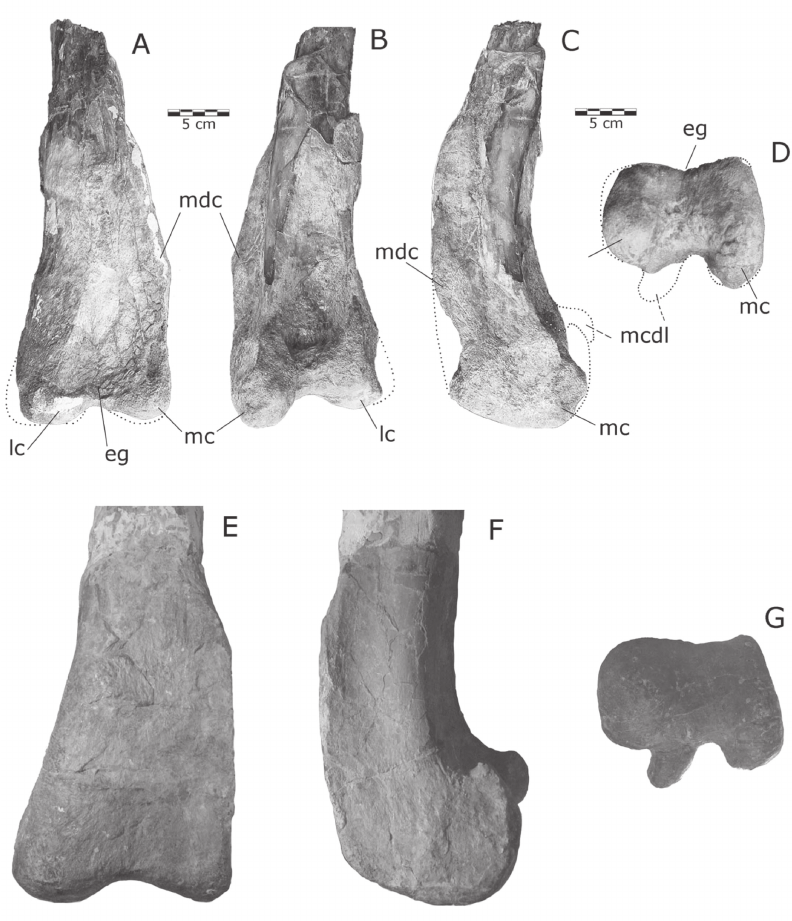
The partial femur of Quilmesaurus (A-D) compared to that of Carnotaurus (E-G)

The preserved portion of femur is robust and boxy in shape. The rear face of the tip of the bone possessed prominent condyles (joint bumps) for connecting to the tibia (on the inner face of the leg) and fibula (on the outer face of the leg). The lateral condyle (which connected to the fibula) is slightly lower from front-to-back compared to the medial condyle (which connected to the tibia), but it is also wider from side-to-side. An additional finger-like bone spur (an epicondyle) would have also been present on the lateral condyle, although this spur is broken off in the only known Quilmesaurus femur. Just above the medial condyle is a low yet noticeable ridge which juts away from the rest of the bone, towards the midline of the animal's body. This ridge is known as a mesiodistal crest. The area immediately above the condyles possesses a shallow yet wide lowered area known as an extensor groove. Overall the femur is almost identical to that of other abelisaurids.

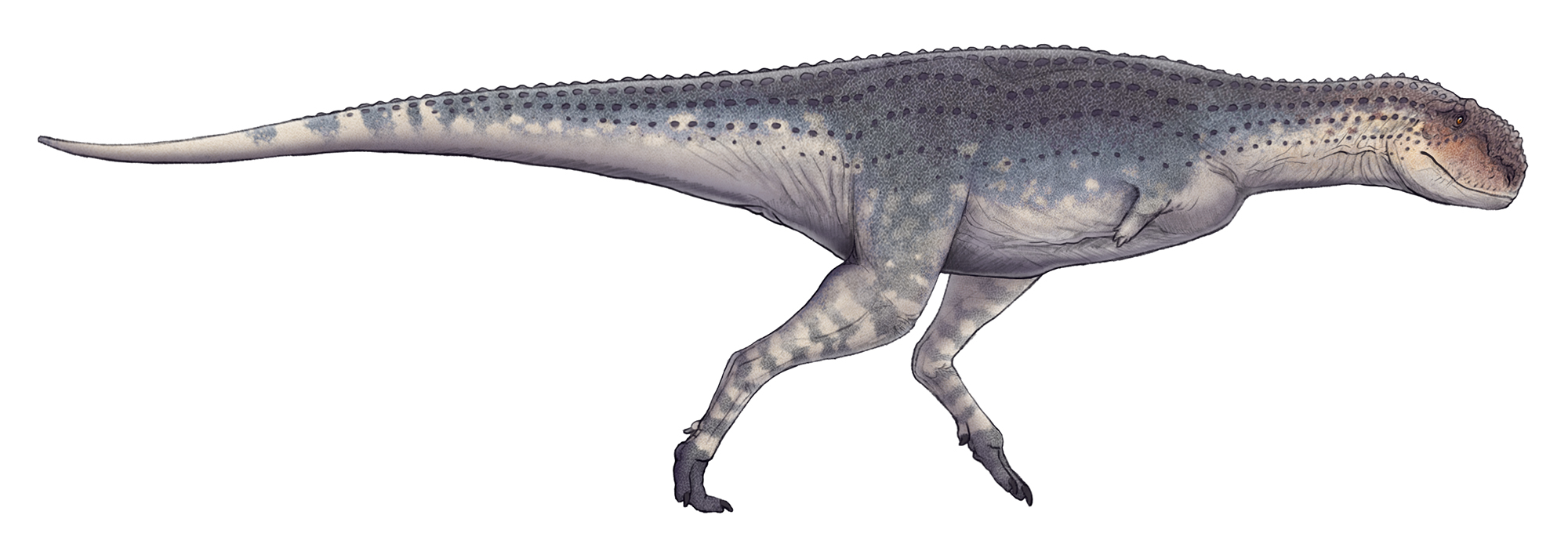
Life restoration

The proximal (upper or innermost) part of the tibia possesses a myriad of complex features. A large and hatchet-shaped structure known as a cnemial crest points forwards at the proximal portion of the tibia. The tip of the cnemial crest is hooked due to the presence of a downward pointing spur, known as a ventral process. Although Coria (2001) considered a hooked cnemial crest to be unique to Quilmesaurus, Valieri et al. (2007) noted that this structure was also possessed by Aucasaurus and Majungasaurus, as well as the ambiguous abelisaurid Genusaurus. The distal part of the tibia possesses its own projections for connecting to ankle bones, known as malleoli. This part has the form of an asymmetrical triangle when seen from the front, with the massive lateral malleolus projecting further distally than the smaller medial malleolus. This combination of distal tibia features was also once presumed to have been unique to Quilmesaurus. However, Valieri et al. (2007) note that the distal tibia of Rajasaurus was very similar to that of Quilmesaurus.

In 2016, Quilmesaurus was estimated to have measured 5.3 metres (17 ft) in length. This would have made it among the smallest derived abelisaurids, although its legs were proportionally robust like those of Pycnonemosaurus, one of the largest members of the family.

=== Pathology ===
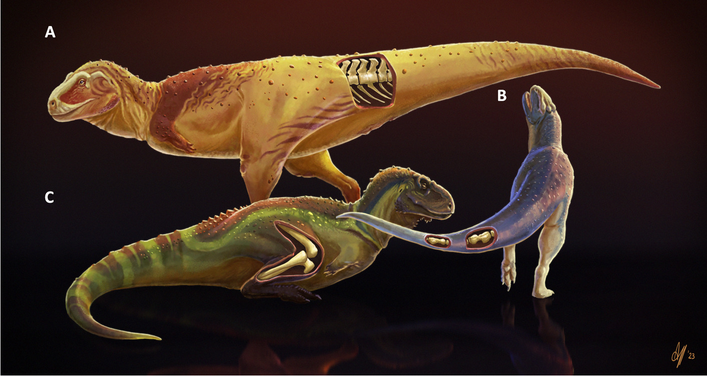
Life restoration of abelisaurids from which pathological bones have been described. Quilmesaurus is C.

The holotype tibia of Quilmesaurus seems to demonstrate some form of pathology. The exact cause is unclear, but it may have been related to disease or a physiological response to an external force.

== Classification ==
When originally described, Coria could not find a more precise placement for Quilmesaurus than Theropoda. The presence of a notch in the distal articular surface of the tibia was cited by him as evidence of a possible relationship with basal Tetanurae, which would be surprising as Quilmesaurus lived during a time when South American theropod assemblages were dominated by abelisaurids and carcharodontosaurs. Other theropod material has been recovered from within these same strata and has in 2005 also provisionally been referred to the Tetanurae. However, in a 2004 abstract (and later a 2007 full paper), Rubén Juárez Valieri et al. concluded that Quilmesaurus, in view of the hatchet-shaped cnemial crest, was a member of the Abelisauridae.

Unlike members of Megalosauroidea, the tibia of Quilmesaurus does not possess a noticeable anteromedial buttress, and instead it includes a large cnemial crest. Quilmesaurus is also not a coelurosaur due to the distal part of the tibia being asymmetrical in shape as well as having a socket for the astragalus which is lower than that of coelurosaurs. Finally, the shallow and wide (rather than deep and thin) extensor groove excludes Quilmesaurus from Carnosauria, as does the possession of parallel upper and lower edges of the cnemial crest.

However, some features do support its placement within Ceratosauria. These include a pronounced cnemial crest of the tibia and large mesiodistal crest of the femur. The asymmetrical distal part of the tibia and small socket for the astragalus specifically place it within the family Abelisauridae. The preserved bones share features with various abelisaurid taxa throughout the family, although such similarities are widespread and seemingly pop up at random among the taxa, thus making more specific placement difficult. The hook-like shape of the cnemial crest suggests that Quilmesaurus was a member of the subfamily Carnotaurinae, which Sereno (1998) defined to include all abelisaurids closer to Carnotaurus than to Abelisaurus.

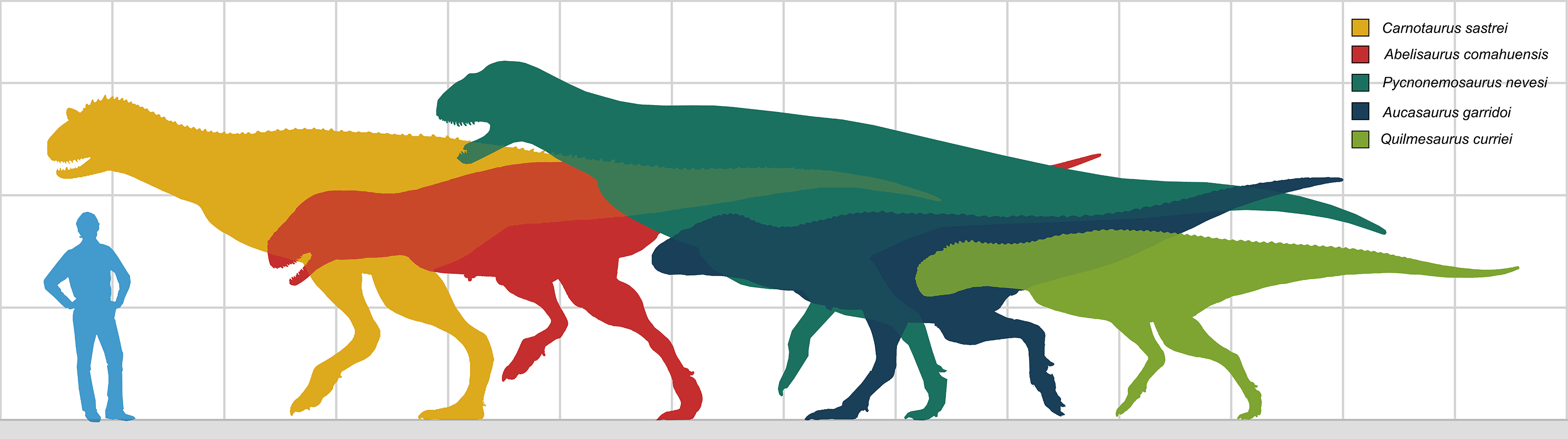
Size comparison of Quilmesaurus (far right) with other "carnotaurins"

However, the validity of Carnotaurinae has been debated. Although Valieri et al. (2007) considered the subfamily to include taxa such as Majungasaurus, Carnotaurus, Aucasaurus, and Rajasaurus, other studies have found different results. Tortosa et al. (2014) found that Carnotaurinae was an invalid group, as very few abelisaurids could actually apply to the definition set forth by Sereno. According to their analysis, Aucasaurus and Carnotaurus were actually closer to Abelisaurus than they were to Majungasaurus and Rajasaurus, thus forcing the latter two taxa to be excluded from the subfamily. Quilmesaurus was retained as close to Aucasaurus and Carnotaurus, although Sereno's name and definition of Carnotaurinae was completely demolished. In its place the tribe Carnotaurini was used, which includes all abelisaurids descended from the last common ancestor of Aucasaurus and Carnotaurus. Tortosa et al. (2014)'s result has largely been supported over that of Valieri et al. (2007). Filippi et al. (2016) created a new clade, Furileusauria, to include abelisaurids more closely related to Carnotaurus than to Ilokelesia, Skorpiovenator, or Majungasaurus. They included Quilmesaurus among the furileusaurians.

Valieri et al. (2007) were unable to establish a single autapomorphy (distinctive or unique trait) of the taxon, concluding that Quilmesaurus were a nomen vanum.

== Paleoecology ==
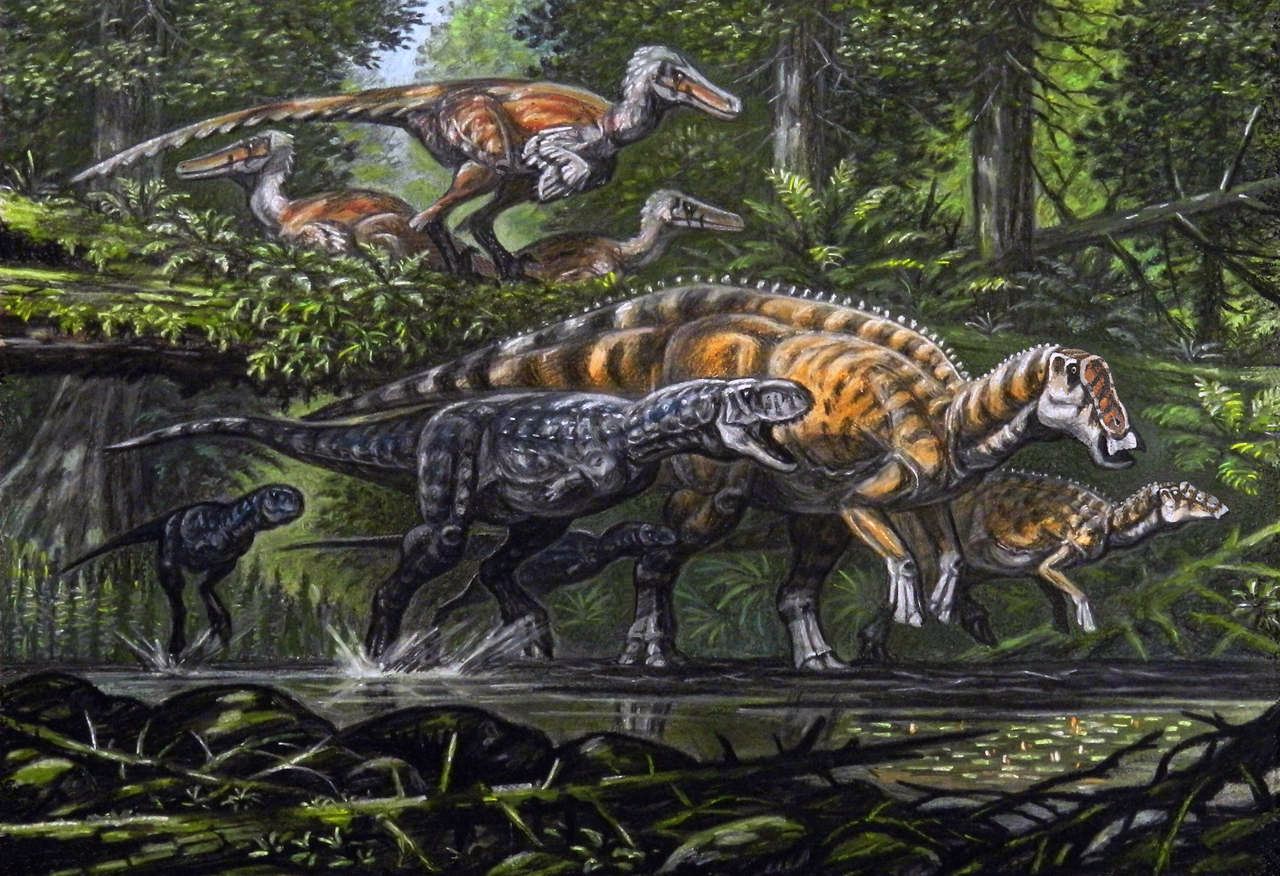
Quilmesaurus chasing Bonapartesaurus, while an Austroraptor group watches

The Allen Formation is believed to have been a humid coastal environment which gradually transitioned from a freshwater floodplain to marshy estuaries and then shallow lagoons as sea levels rose. A diverse assemblage of aquatic life inhabited the area, including various fish, frogs, and turtles. More recent intervals of the formation even include a few marine reptiles, such as various plesiosaurs including elasmosaurids and polycotylids. Plant life includes palm trees and conifers of the family Podocarpeaceae ("plum pines"), which formed dense forests and wetlands.

Remains of land animals were also common in this formation. An indeterminate rhynchocephalian is known, as well as numerous snake taxa including the madtsoiids Patagoniophis and Alamitophis. Other non-dinosaur animals in the area include the pterosaur Aerotitan and a variety of mammals.

Dinosaur remains recovered from the Allen Formation include a diverse and abundant assortment of titanosaurs (Saltasaurus, Aeolosaurus, Laplatasaurus, Rocasaurus, etc.) and a hadrosaurid of dubious validity (Willinakaqe). Theropods other than Quilmesaurus were also present; they include the large unenlagiine dromaeosaurid Austroraptor, a basal ornithuran bird (Limenavis), and a cimolopterygid bird (Lamarqueavis). A tooth has been referred to the family Carcharodontosauridae; this tooth is one of the most recent carcharodontosaurid fossils found as more well known members of this family (Giganotosaurus, Mapusaurus) lived millions of years earlier in the Cretaceous. Indeterminate nodosaurid remains have also been found at this formation, consisting of vertebrae, osteoderms, a femur, and a tooth.

The Allen Formation is also notable for the high amount of sauropod eggs discovered there. Nesting grounds have been discovered in the bajo de Santa Rosa area of the upper Allen Formation. Some (but not all) of these eggs were designated as the oogenus Sphaerovum. The structure of their eggshells indicate that they were laid in a very damp environment.

== See also ==
- Timeline of ceratosaur research
