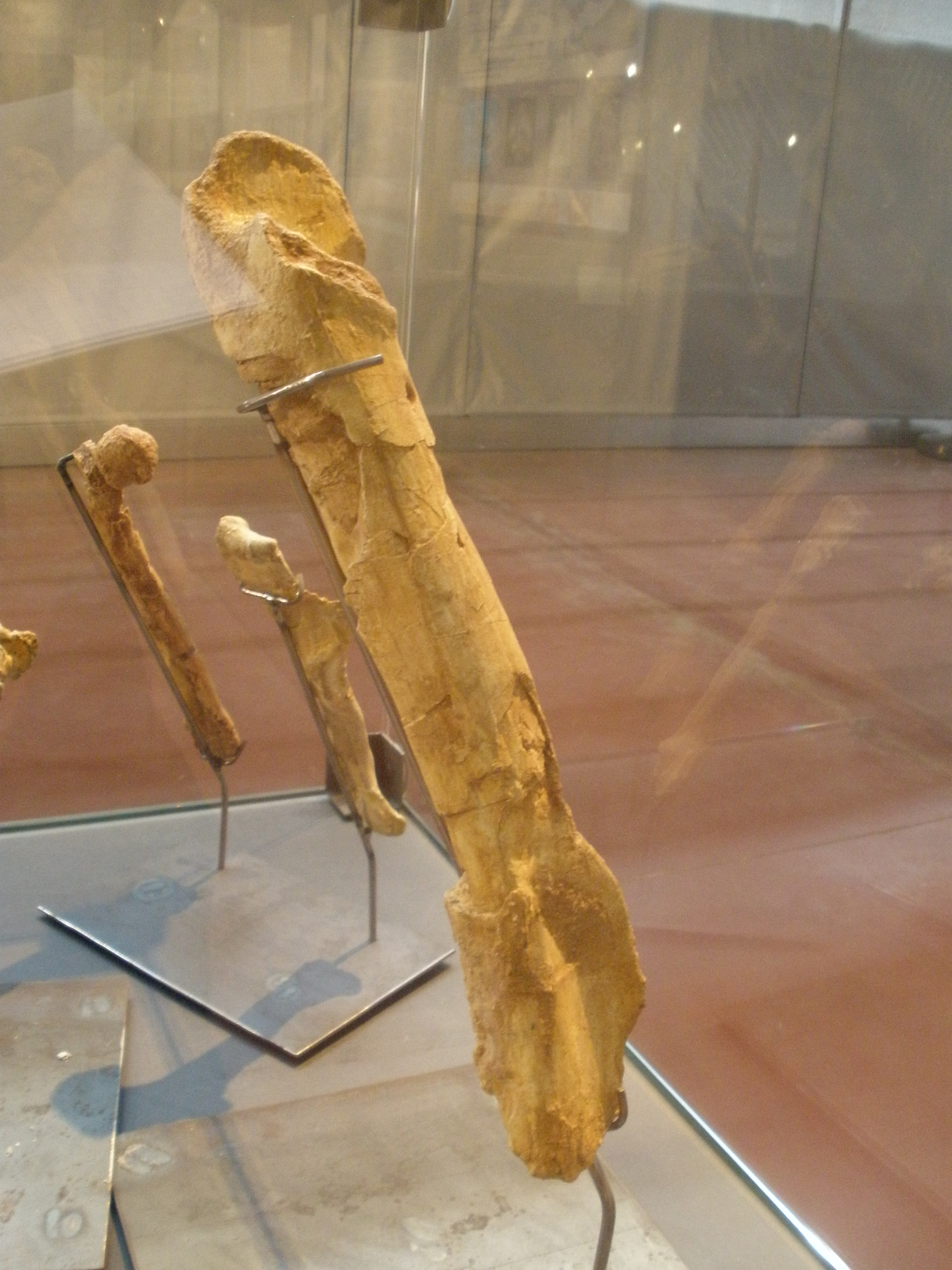
- Tarascosaurus salluvicus femur
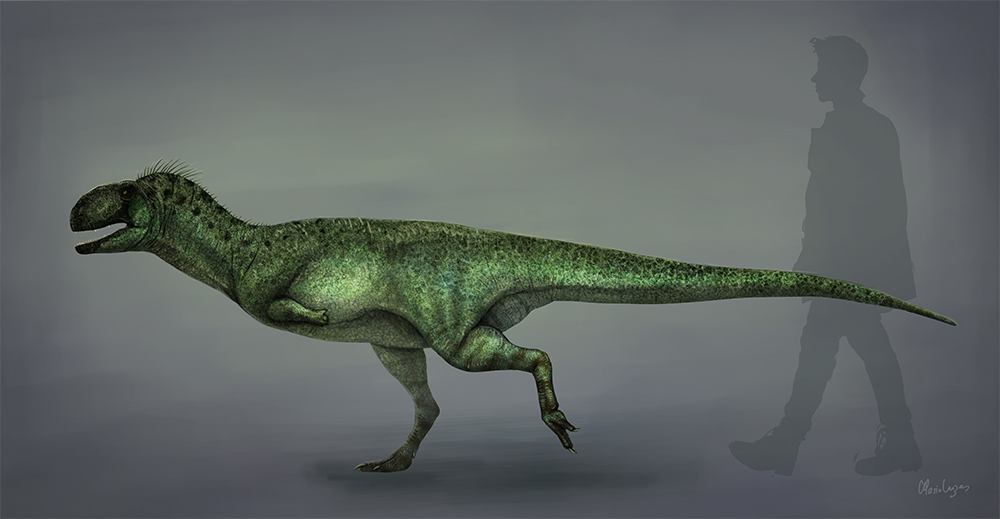
- Life reconstruction of Tarascosaurus compared to a human

Scientific classification
- Kingdom: Animalia
- Phylum: Chordata
- Class: Reptilia
- Clade: Dinosauria
- Clade: Saurischia
- Clade: Theropoda
- Family: †Abelisauridae
- Genus: †Tarascosaurus; Le Loeuff & Buffetaut, 1991
- Species: †T. salluvicus

Binomial name
- †Tarascosaurus salluvicus Le Loeuff & Buffetaut, 1991

= Tarascosaurus =

Tarascosaurus Temporal range: Late Cretaceous, 80–66 Ma

Theropod dinosaur genus from Late Cretaceous

Tarascosaurus ("Tarasque lizard") is a genus of abelisaurid theropod dinosaur from Late Cretaceous of France. It was a relatively small theropod measuring 2.5–3 metres (8.2–9.8 ft) long.

== Discovery ==
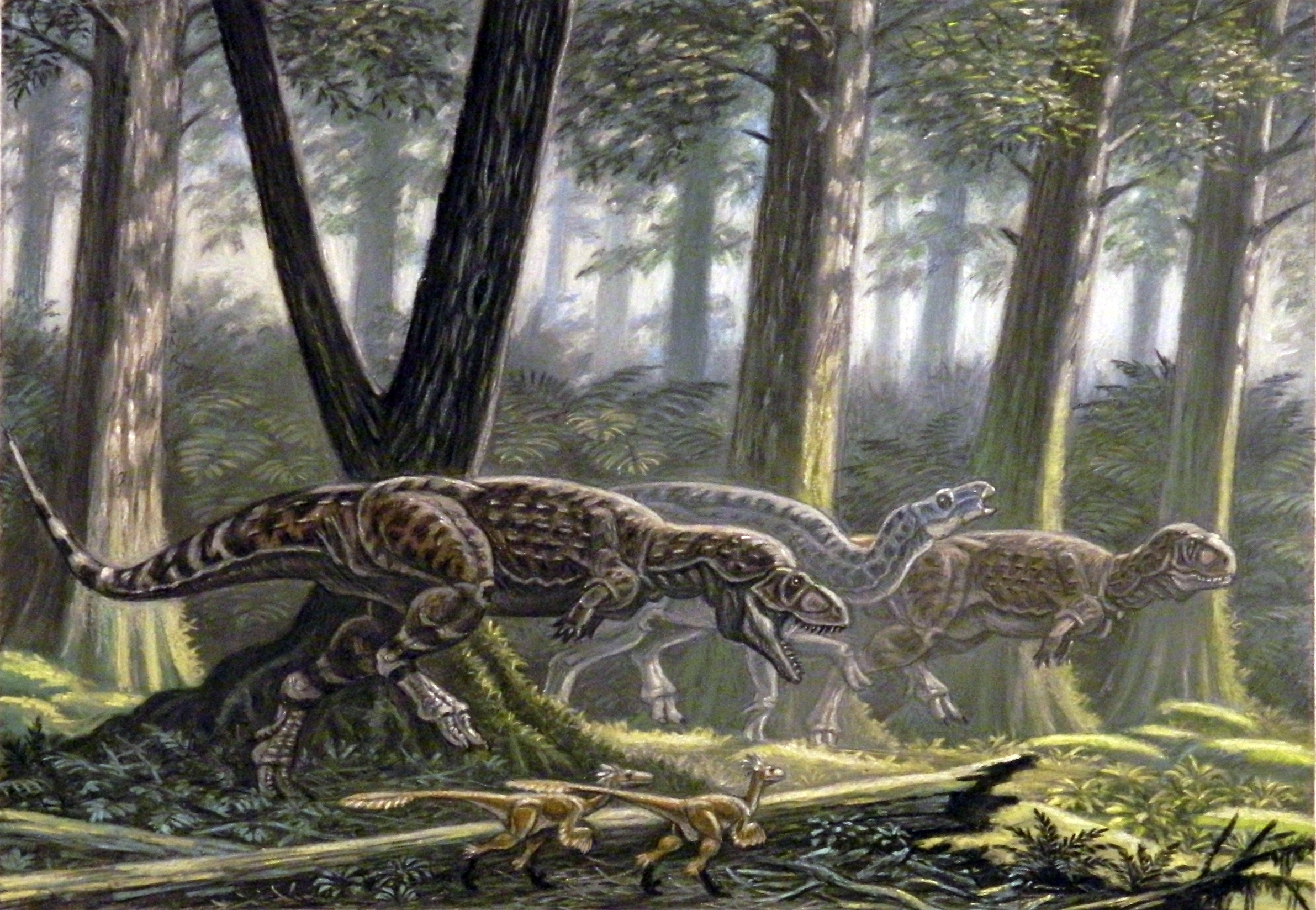
Restoration of two Tarascosaurus chasing an iguanodont

After having in 1988 identified an upper jaw bone found near Pourcieux as belonging to a member of the Abelisauridae, French paleontologist Éric Buffetaut reviewed the known remains of larger theropods found in the Late Cretaceous of Europe concluding they all were of abelisaurid affinity. Most of these fossils, earlier named as Megalosaurus pannoniensis, Megalosaurus hungaricus and Megalosaurus lonzeensis, he considered to be nomina dubia because of the paucity of the material. However, when in the collection of the University of Lyon he discovered some theropod bones once excavated by an unknown collector at an escarpment of a place named Lambeau du Beausset, in the "syncline of Le Beausset" (in French: synclinal du Beausset), Buffetaut and Jean Le Loeuff named and described these in 1991 as the type species Tarascosaurus salluvicus. The generic name is derived from the Tarasque or Tarasca, a devouring monster from Occitan and Spanish folklore. The specific name refers to the Salluvii, a Gallic tribe in Antiquity inhabiting the area near Marseille.

The holotype PSL 330201 was found in the Fuvelian Beds, dating from the lower Campanian. It consists of the upper part of a thigh bone, 22 centimetres (8.7 in) long. PSL 330202, consisting of two dorsal vertebrae, was made a paratype; these bones may belong to the same individual. Referred was PSL 330203, a damaged tail vertebra. The femur, with an undamaged length estimated at 35 centimetres (14 in), indicates a body length of 2.5–3 metres (8.2–9.8 ft).

Tarascosaurus was placed in the Abelisauridae in 1991. It was then seen as the only known abelisaurid from the Northern Hemisphere apart from Betasuchus of the Maastrichtian of the Netherlands but since then more species of abelisaurids have been found in the northern hemisphere. However, in 2003, Ronan Allain and Xabier Pereda-Suberbiola concluded that the type lacked any uniquely abelisaurid traits and that it should be considered a nomen dubium. In 2003, Oliver Rauhut concluded that Tarascosaurus itself was also a nomen dubium because the material was not diagnostic. In 2014, Tortosa and colleagues considered Tarascosaurus as a distinct abelisaurid from related taxa like Genusaurus and Arcovenator based on its femoral morphologies and its ontogenetic features. Phylogenetic analyses in the 2020s also support that it is an abelisaurid.

== See also ==
- Timeline of ceratosaur research
