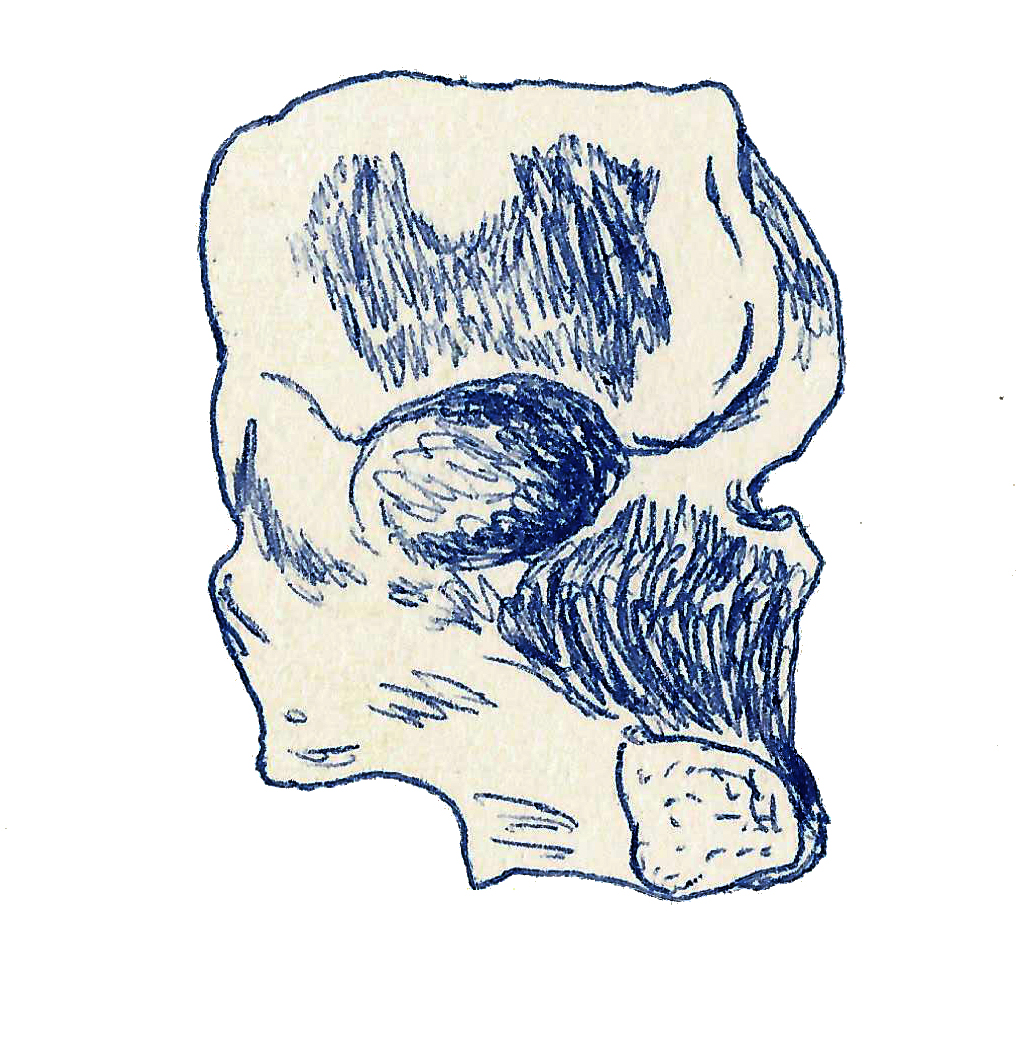
- Vertebra

Scientific classification
- Kingdom: Animalia
- Phylum: Chordata
- Class: Reptilia
- Clade: Dinosauria
- Clade: Saurischia
- Clade: Theropoda
- Genus: †Compsosuchus; Huene & Matley, 1933
- Species: †C. solus

Binomial name
- †Compsosuchus solus Matley & Huene, 1933

= Compsosuchus =

Compsosuchus Temporal range: Late Cretaceous, 69–66 Ma

Extinct genus of dinosaurs

Compsosuchus (meaning "elegant crocodile") is a dubious genus of abelisauroid theropod dinosaur from the Late Cretaceous Lameta Formation of India.

== Discovery and naming ==
Compsosuchus was described in 1933 by von Huene and Matley based on remains discovered between 1917 and 1919. The type species is C. solus, and the type and only specimen is GSI K27/578, an axis with an articulated axial intersection. The genus is often considered a nomen dubium.

== Classification ==
Although classified as an allosaurid by von Huene and Matley (1933) and Molnar et al. (1990) because of superficial similarities with the axis vertebrae of Allosaurus, a 2004 review of Lameta Formation theropods found it to be similar to members of the Abelisauridae, including Carnotaurus and Indosaurus, necessitating the placement of Compsosuchus as an abelisaurid. While a 2011 study classified Compsosuchus as a noasaurid, a 2024 study identified it as an indeterminate abelisaurid.

== See also ==
- Timeline of ceratosaur research
