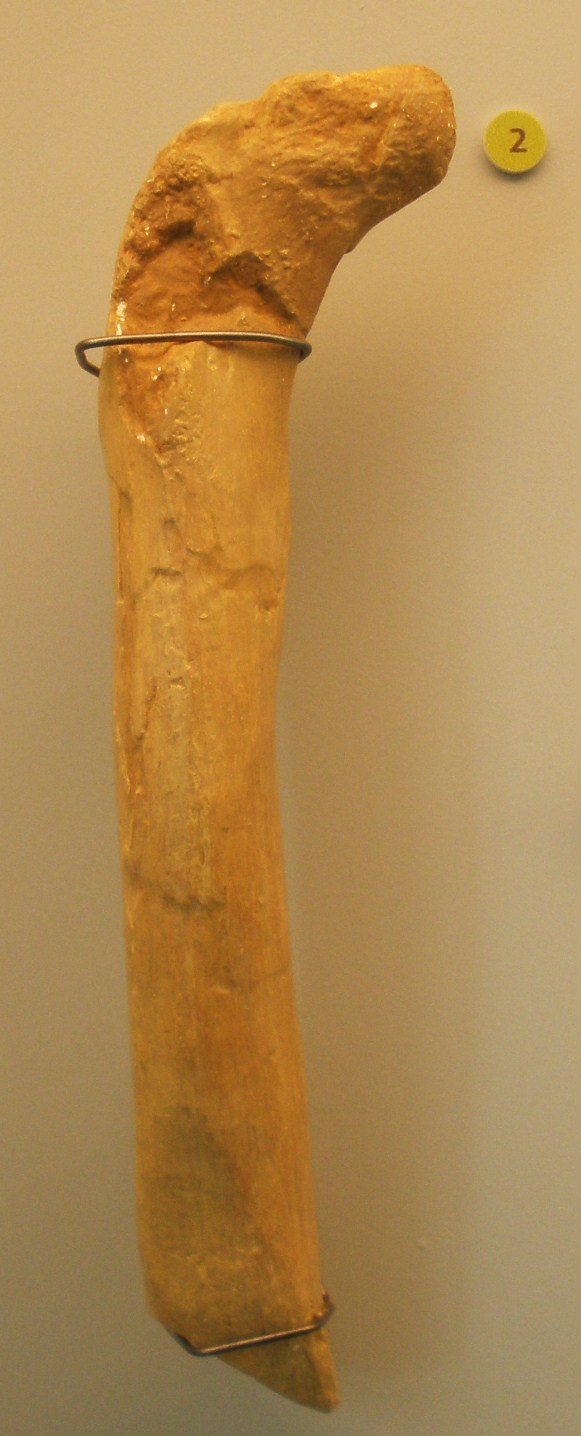
- Cast of the femur

Scientific classification
- Kingdom: Animalia
- Phylum: Chordata
- Class: Reptilia
- Clade: Dinosauria
- Clade: Saurischia
- Clade: Theropoda
- Clade: †Neoceratosauria
- Superfamily: †Abelisauroidea
- Family: †Abelisauridae
- Genus: †Betasuchus von Huene, 1932
- Species: †B. bredai

Binomial name
- †Betasuchus bredai (Seeley, 1883 [originally Megalosaurus])

Synonyms
- Megalosaurus bredai Seeley, 1883

= Betasuchus =

Betasuchus Temporal range: Late Cretaceous, 66 Ma

Extinct genus of dinosaurs

Betasuchus is a genus of probable abelisaurid theropod dinosaur which lived during the Late Cretaceous Period. Betasuchus is, besides Orthomerus and birds such as Janavis, the only dinosaur genus named from remains found in the Netherlands, and the only non-avian theropod found in the Maastrichtian Beds.

== Discovery ==
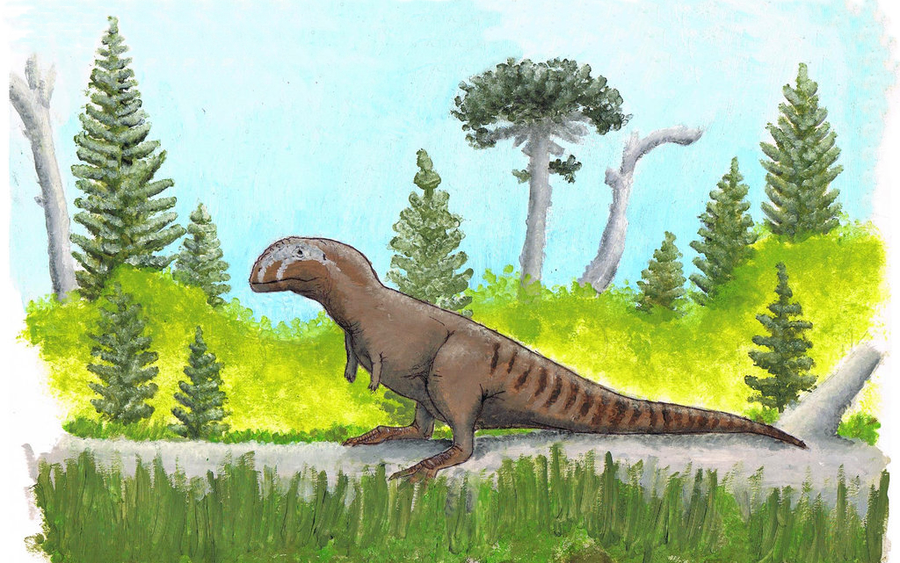
Speculative reconstruction as an abelisaurid, based on relatives

Its fossil, holotype BMNH 42997 (now NHM R 42997), a part of a right femur, 312 mm long, was found in the Netherlands near Maastricht, and originally described as a new species of Megalosaurus in 1883 by Harry Govier Seeley: M. bredai, honouring the late Dutch biologist and geologist Jacob Gijsbertus Samuël van Breda, a director of the Teylers Museum, who had collected the fossil at some time between 1820 and 1860 from the chalkstone quarry at the St Pietersberg. Van Breda did not excavate the remains himself but bought them from quarry workers who in this period dug stone from tunnels at several levels in the mountain; it is therefore impossible to determine the exact temporal horizon, apart from a general Maastrichtian; however all dinosaurian material from the formation that could be dated, stems from the latest Maastrichtian, 67-66 million years old. Only the top part of the femur has been conserved; of the distal end about eight centimetres are missing as the bone was cleanly cut in two when the chalk block containing it was sawed out. Other saw cuts damaged the femoral head of the thigh bone. The fossil was part of his personal collection, not the museum's, and sold to the British Museum of Natural History after his death in 1867. In 1892 Belgian/Dutch/German paleontologist Johan Casimir Ubaghs referred some teeth — probably of mosasaurs — to M. bredai. Megalosaurus bredai was in 1883 the first terrestrial vertebrate named from Maastrichtian layers.

A re-evaluation of the fossil by Friedrich von Huene in 1926, however, showed that it came from a genus distinct from Megalosaurus — which in the nineteenth and early twentieth century was a "wastebin taxon" where many unrelated carnivorous dinosaurs were lumped together. Von Huene thought that the fossil actually belonged to an ornithomimosaur, and gave it the provisional designation "Ornithomimidorum [sic] genus b" (in Latin: genus b of the ornithomimids), being the second of two Megalosaurus species he was reallocating to Ornithomimidae, the first being M. lonzeensis as "Ornithomimidorum genus a". "Ornithomimidorum" is sometimes mistakenly listed as a dinosaur genus name. Von Huene referred to this designation when he formally renamed M. bredai in 1932, calling it Betasuchus (or "B crocodile" in Greek).

In 2017 its length was estimated to be 4 meters (13 feet).

== Phylogeny ==
Betasuchus is known only from a single incomplete femur, so its exact relationships with other theropods have been difficult to determine. In 1972 Dale Russell confirmed Von Huene's opinion that Betasuchus was an ornithomimosaurid, but also considered the name a nomen vanum: a failed emendation. Some workers in reference to the material still use M. bredai instead of Betasuchus. David Norman in 1990 listed Megalosaurus bredai as a nomen dubium.

Jean le Loeuff and Eric Buffetaut in 1991 concluded it was a small abelisaurid, close to Tarascosaurus and that it was distinct enough not to consider it a nomen dubium: they mentioned a more narrow femoral neck, a lack of orientation of the femoral head towards the front, the lack of an opening, or foramen, under the lesser trochanter and that the anterior face is narrower. Furthermore, at the lower end the beginnings of an anterointernal crest are visible, seeming to be homologous to the supracondylar crest of the femur of Carnotaurus. They rejected the placement within Ornithomimidae, partly because of the much higher position of the fourth trochanter on the back of the femur.

In 1997 Betasuchus was concluded by Carpenter, Russell and Baird to be related to Dryptosaurus, a tyrannosauroid. In 2004 Tykoski and Rowe placed Tarascosaurus within the Abelisauroidea.

A 2022 study suggested that Betasuchus was a ceratosaur, and likely an abelisaurid. A 2024 study by Buffetaut and colleagues again concluded that Betasuchus was an abelisaurid.

== See also ==
- Timeline of ceratosaur research
