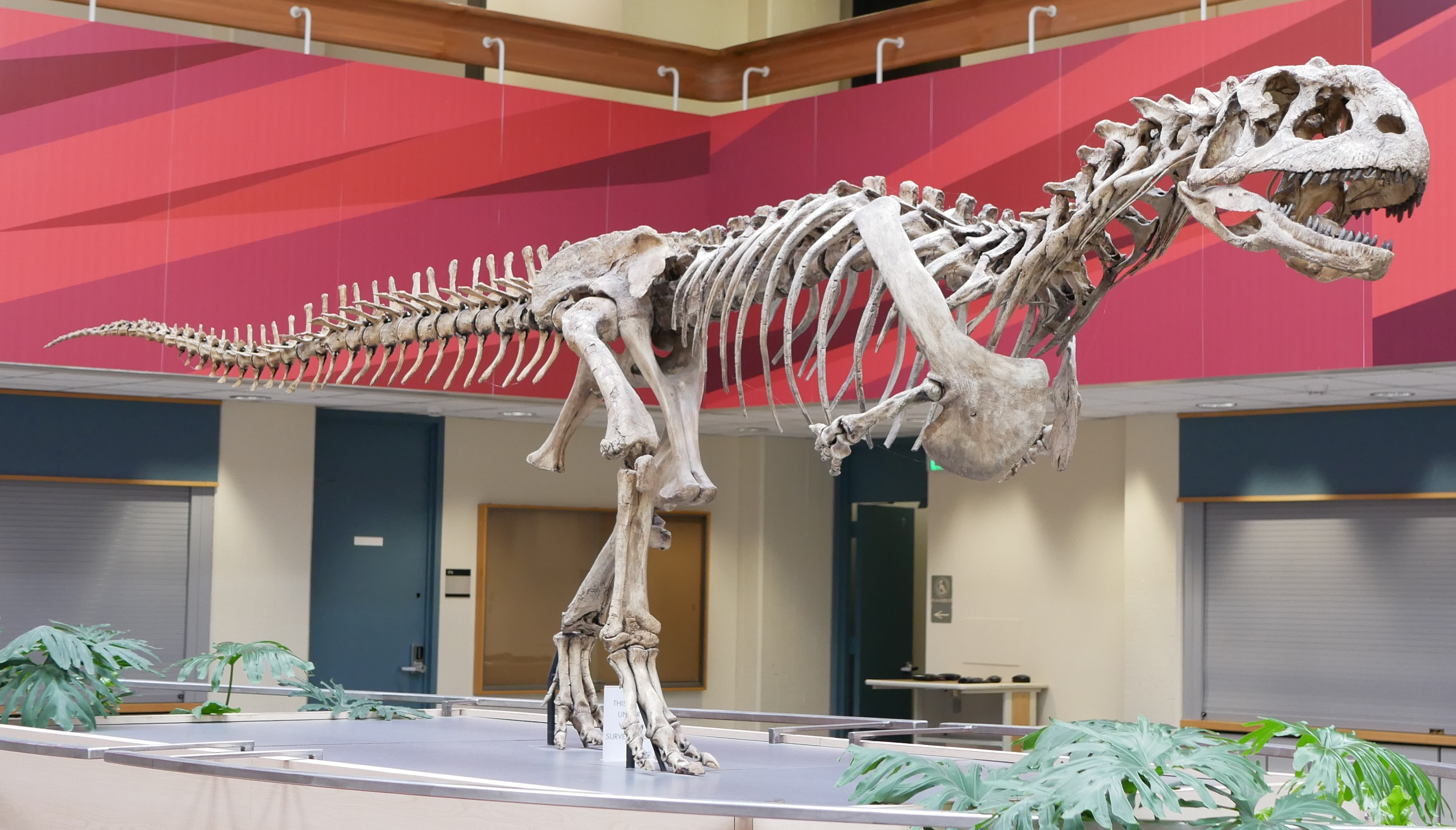
- Majungasaurus crenatissimus skeleton, Stony Brook University

Scientific classification
- Kingdom: Animalia
- Phylum: Chordata
- Class: Reptilia
- Clade: Dinosauria
- Clade: Saurischia
- Clade: Theropoda
- Superfamily: †Abelisauroidea
- Family: †Abelisauridae; Bonaparte & Novas, 1985

Type species
- †Abelisaurus comahuensis Bonaparte & Novas, 1985

Subgroups
- †Betasuchus?; †Chenanisaurus; †Compsosuchus?; †Dahalokely?; †Eoabelisaurus?; †Genusaurus; †Indosuchus; †Kryptops; †Kurupi; †Rugops; †Spectrovenator; †Tarascosaurus; †Tralkasaurus; †Vitosaura; †Xenotarsosaurus; †Brachyrostra; †Majungasaurinae

= Abelisauridae =

Abelisaurids Temporal range: Cretaceous Possibly present since Jurassic based on Eoabelisaurus and indeterminate fossils

Extinct family of dinosaurs

Abelisauridae (meaning "Abel's lizards") is a family (or clade) of ceratosaurian theropod dinosaurs. Abelisaurids thrived during the Cretaceous period, mainly on the ancient southern supercontinent of Gondwana, and today their fossil remains are found on the modern continents of Africa, South America, and (western) Europe, as well as on the Indian subcontinent and the island of Madagascar. Abelisaurids possibly first appeared during the Early Jurassic based on the putative abelisaurid Eoabelisaurus from Patagonia and some genera survived until the end of the Mesozoic era, around 66 million years ago.

Like most theropods, abelisaurids were carnivorous bipeds. They were characterized by stocky hind limbs and extensive ornamentation of the skull bones, with grooves and pits. In many abelisaurids, such as Carnotaurus, the fore limbs are vestigial, the skull is shorter, and bony crests grow above the eyes. Most of the known abelisaurids would have been between 5 and 9 m (17 and 30 ft) in length, from snout to tip of tail, with a new and as yet unnamed specimen from northwestern Turkana in Kenya reaching a possible length of 11–12 m (36-39 ft). Before becoming well known, fragmentary abelisaurid remains were occasionally misidentified as possible South American tyrannosaurids.

== Description ==
Size comparison of five abelisaurids; Carnotaurus, Ekrixinatosaurus, Skorpiovenator, Aucasaurus, and Majungasaurus

Abelisaurid hind limbs were more typical of ceratosaurs, with the astragalus and calcaneum (upper ankle bones) fused to each other and to the tibia, forming a tibiotarsus. The tibia was shorter than the femur, giving the hind limb stocky proportions. Three functional digits were on the foot (the second, third, and fourth), while the first digit, or hallux, did not contact the ground.

=== Skull ===
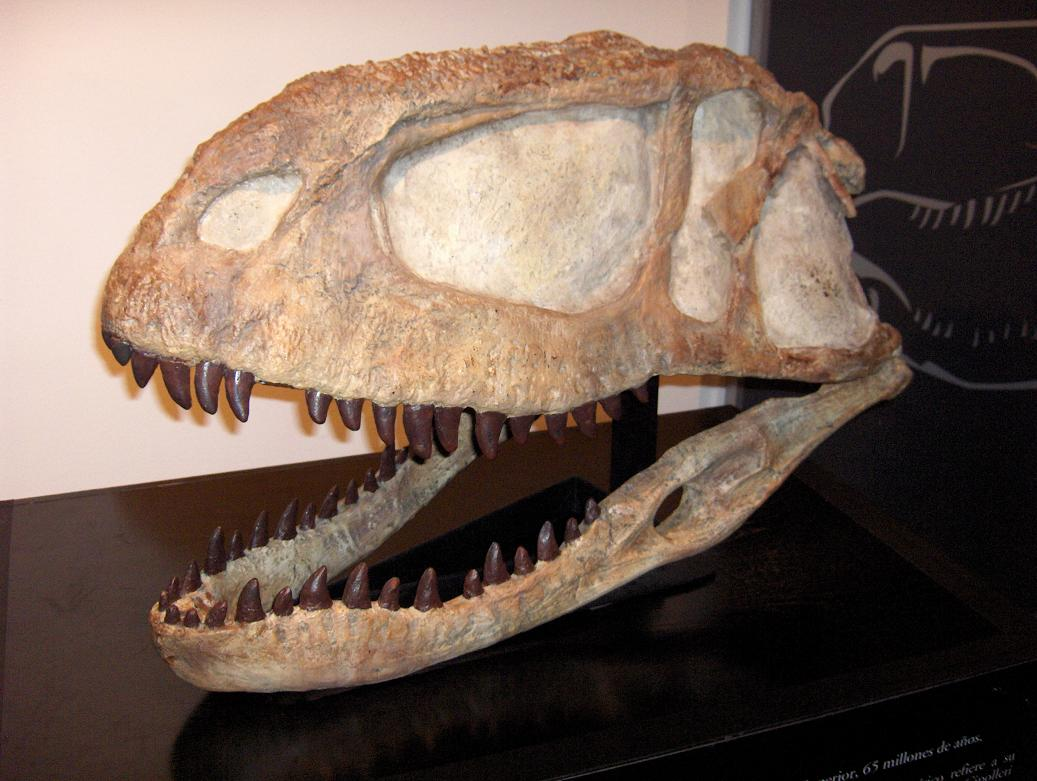
Skull of Abelisaurus.

Although skull proportions varied, abelisaurid skulls were generally very tall and very short in length. In Carnotaurus, for example, the skull was nearly as tall as it was long. The premaxilla in abelisaurids was very tall, so the front of the snout was blunt, not tapered as seen in many other theropods.

Two skull bones, the lacrimal and postorbital, projected into the eye socket from the front and back, nearly dividing it into two compartments. The eye would have been located in the upper compartment, which was tilted slightly outwards in Carnotaurus, perhaps providing some degree of binocular vision. The lacrimal and postorbital also met above the eye socket to form a ridge or brow above the eye.

Sculpturing is seen on many of the skull bones, in the form of long grooves, pits, and protrusions. Like other ceratosaurs, the frontal bones of the skull roof were fused together. Carnotaurines commonly had bony projections from the skull. Carnotaurus had two pronounced horns, projecting outward above the eyes, while its close relative Aucasaurus had smaller projections in the same area. Majungasaurus and Rajasaurus had a single bony horn or dome, projecting upwards from the skull. These projections, like the horns of many modern animals, might have been displayed for species recognition or intimidation. In Arcovenator, the dorsal margin of the postorbital (and probably also the lacrimal) is thickened dorsolaterally, forming a strong and rugose bony brow ridge rising above the level of the skull roof. Possibly, this rugose brow ridge supported a keratinous or scaly structure for displays.

=== Fore limbs and hands ===
Hand bones of Carnotaurus, as interpreted by Ruiz and colleagues (2011)

Data for the abelisaurid fore limbs are known from Eoabelisaurus and the carnotaurines Aucasaurus, Carnotaurus, and Majungasaurus. All had small fore limbs, which seem to have been vestigial. The bones of the forearm (radius and ulna) were extremely short, only 25% of the length of the upper arm (humerus) in Carnotaurus and 33% in Aucasaurus. The entire arm was held straight, and the elbow joint was immobile.

As is typical for ceratosaurs, the abelisaurid hand had four basic digits, but any similarity ends there. No wrist bones existed, with the four palm bones (metacarpals) attaching directly to the forearm. No phalanges (finger bones) were on the first or fourth digits, only one on the second digit and two on the third digit. These two external fingers were extremely short and immobile. Manual claws were very small in Eoabelisaurus, and totally absent in carnotaurines.

More primitive relatives such as Noasaurus and Ceratosaurus had longer, mobile arms with fingers and claws. Paleobiologist Alexander O. Vargas suggested a major reason for the evolution towards vestigial fore limbs in the group was because of a genetic defect; the loss of function in HOXA11 and HOXD11, two genes that regulate the fore limbs' development.

== Distribution ==
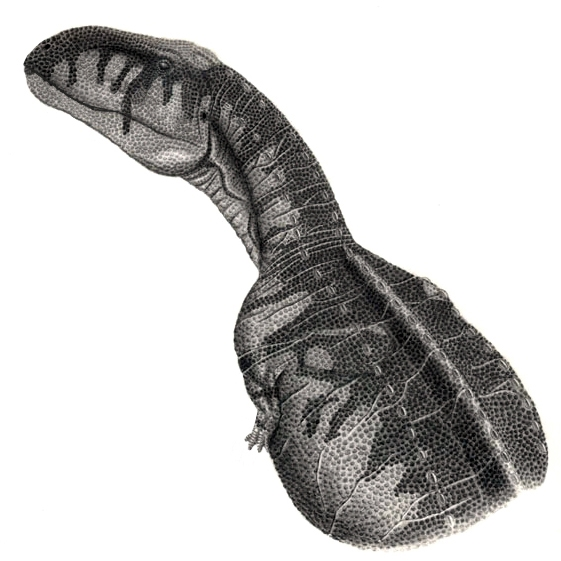
Illustration of Abelisaurus

Abelisaurids are typically regarded as a Cretaceous period group. The earliest possible abelisaurid taxon is Eoabelisaurus mefi from the Jurassic period of Argentina, though other researchers either consider it as a ceratosaurid, an abelisauroid, or its sister taxon outside abelisaurids. Indeterminate remains are also known from the Jurassic period of Madagascar and Tanzania. Abelisaurid remains are mainly known in the southern continents, which once made up the supercontinent of Gondwana. When first described in 1985, only Carnotaurus and Abelisaurus were known, both from the Late Cretaceous of South America. Abelisaurids were then located in Late Cretaceous India (Indosuchus and Rajasaurus) and Madagascar (Majungasaurus), which were closely connected for much of the Cretaceous. The absence of abelisaurids from continental Africa were thought to have indicated that the group evolved after the separation of Africa from Gondwana, around 100 million years ago. However, the discovery of Rugops and other abelisaurid material from the middle of the Cretaceous in northern Africa disproved this hypothesis. Mid-Cretaceous abelisaurids are now known from South America, as well, showing that the group existed prior to the breakup of Gondwana. In 2014, the description of Arcovenator escotae from southern France provided the first indisputable evidence of the presence of Abelisaurids in Europe. Arcovenator presents strong similarities with the Madagascan Majungasaurus and Indian abelisaurids, but not with the South American forms. Arcovenator, Majungasaurus, and Indian forms are united in a new clade, the Majungasaurinae.

== Classification ==
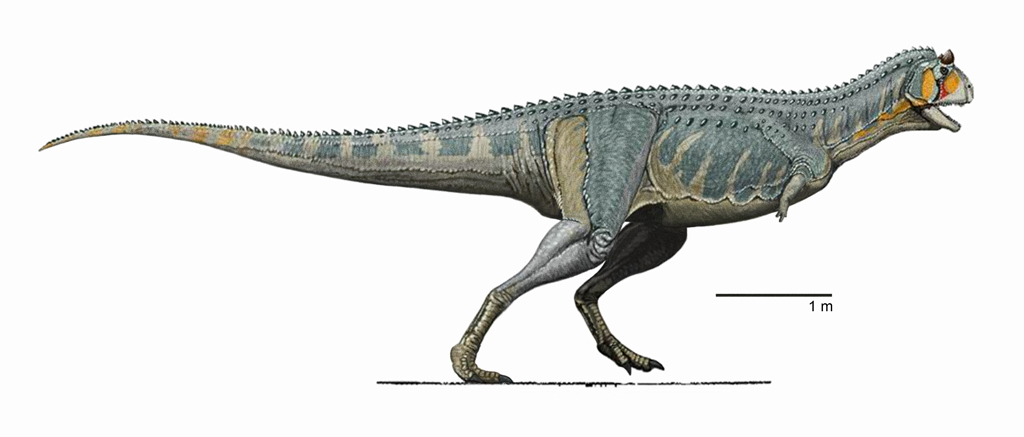
Illustration of Carnotaurus

Paleontologists Jose Bonaparte and Fernando Novas coined the name Abelisauridae in 1985 when they described the eponymous Abelisaurus. The name is formed from the family name of Roberto Abel, who discovered Abelisaurus, and from the Greek word σαυρος (sauros) meaning lizard. The very common suffix -idae is usually applied to zoological family names and is derived from the Greek suffix -ιδαι (-idai) meaning descendants.

Abelisauridae is a family in rank-based Linnaean taxonomy, within the infraorder Ceratosauria and the superfamily Abelisauroidea, which also contains the family Noasauridae. It has had several definitions in phylogenetic taxonomy. It was originally defined as a node-based taxon, including Abelisaurus, Carnotaurus, their common ancestor, and all of its descendants.

Later, it was redefined as a stem-based taxon, including all animals more closely related to Abelisaurus (or the more complete Carnotaurus) than to Noasaurus. The node-based definition would not include animals such as Rugops or Ilokelesia, which are thought to be more basal than Abelisaurus and would be included by a stem-based definition. Within the Abelisauridae is the subgroup Carnotaurinae, and among carnotaurines, Aucasaurus and Carnotaurus are united in Carnotaurini.

=== Shared characteristics ===
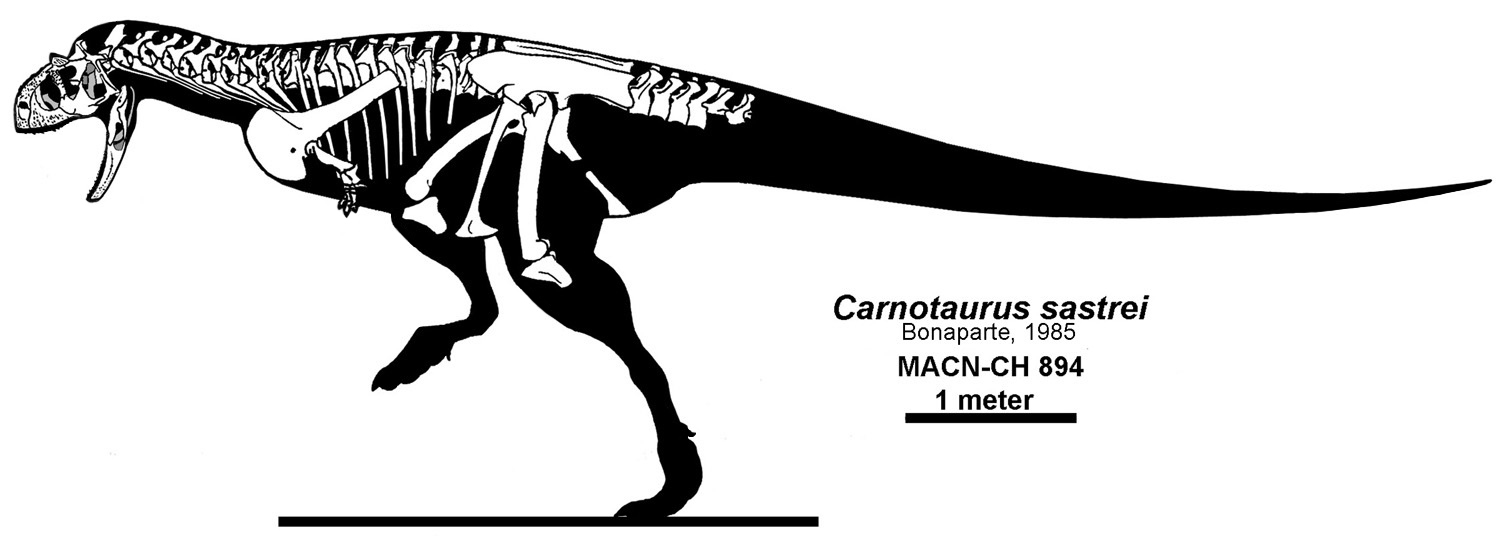
Skeletal diagram of the known material of Carnotaurus

Complete skeletons have been described only for the most advanced abelisaurids (such as Carnotaurus and Aucasaurus), making establishment of defining features of the skeleton for the family as a whole more difficult. However, most are known from at least some skull bones, so known shared features come mainly from the skull. Many abelisaurid skull features are shared with carcharodontosaurids. These shared features, along with the fact that abelisaurids seem to have replaced carcharodontosaurids in South America, have led to suggestions that the two groups were related. However, no cladistic analysis has ever found such a relationship, and aside from the skull, abelisaurids and carcharodontosaurids are very different, more similar to ceratosaurs and allosauroids, respectively.

=== Phylogeny ===
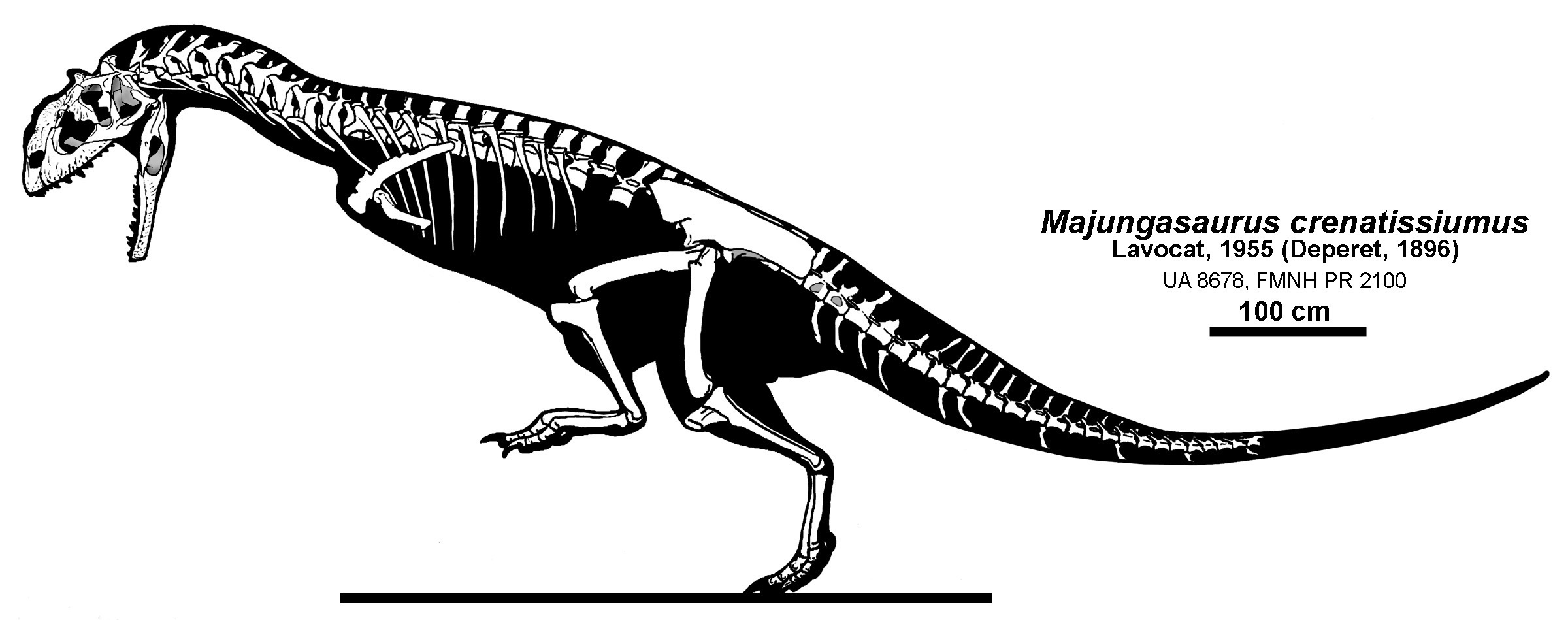
Known material of Majungasaurus

Below is a cladogram generated by Tortosa et al. (2014) in the description of Arcovenator and creation of a new subfamily Majungasaurinae.

- Abelisauridae
  - Kryptops
  - Rugops
  - Genusaurus
  - MCF-PVPH-237 abelisaurid
  - Xenotarsosaurus
  - Tarascosaurus
  - La Boucharde abelisaurid
  - - Majungasaurinae
      - Pourcieux abelisaurid
      - Arcovenator
      - Majungasaurus
      - Indosaurus
      - Rahiolisaurus
      - Rajasaurus
    - Brachyrostra
      - Ilokelesia
      - - Ekrixinatosaurus
        - - Skorpiovenator
          - - Carnotaurini
              - Abelisaurus
              - Aucasaurus
              - Pycnonemosaurus
              - Quilmesaurus
              - Carnotaurus

Ilokelesia was originally described as a sister group to the Abelisauroidea. However, Sereno tentatively places it closer to Abelisaurus than to noasaurids, a result which agrees with several other recent analyses. If a stem-based definition is used, Ilokelesia and Rugops are therefore basal abelisaurids. However, as they are more basal than Abelisaurus, they are outside of the Abelisauridae if the node-based definition is adopted. Ekrixinatosaurus was also published in 2004, so it was not included in Sereno's analysis. However, an independent analysis, performed by Jorge Calvo and colleagues, shows it to be an abelisaurid.

Some scientists include Xenotarsosaurus from Argentina and Compsosuchus from India as basal abelisaurids, while others consider them to be outside the Abelisauroidea. The French Genusaurus and Tarascosaurus have also been called abelisaurids but both are fragmentary and may be more basal ceratosaurians, though Tortosa et al. (2014) considered both to be distinct abelisaurids. Subsequent phylogenetic analyses recover Xenotarsosaurus and Tarascosaurus as an abelisaurid, but Genusaurus as either a noasaurid or an abelisaurid.

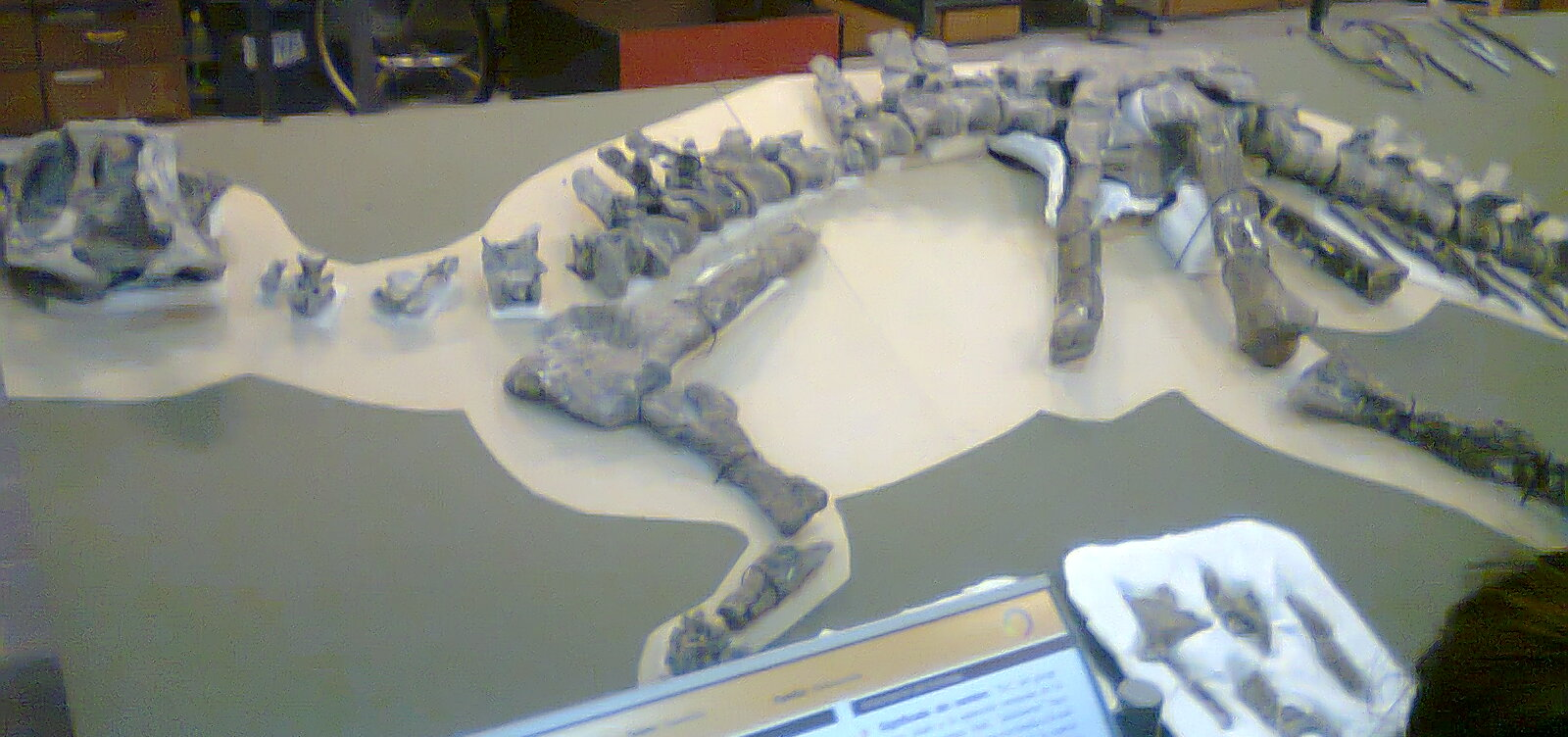
Skeleton of Eoabelisaurus, a close relative of the Abelisauridae

With the description of Skorpiovenator in 2008, Canale et al. published another phylogenetic analysis focusing on the South American abelisaurids. In their results, they found that all South American forms, including Ilokelesia (except Abelisaurus), grouped together as a subclade of carnotaurines, which they named the Brachyrostra. In the same year Matthew T. Carrano and Scott D. Sampson published new large phylogenetic analysis of ceratosaurian. With the description of Eoabelisaurus, Diego Pol and Oliver W. M. Rauhut (2012) combined these analyses and added 10n new characters. The following cladogram follows their analysis.

- Ceratosauria
  - Berberosaurus
  - Deltadromeus
  - - - Spinostropheus
      - - Limusaurus
        - Elaphrosaurus
    - Neoceratosauria
      - Ceratosauridae
        - Ceratosaurus
        - Genyodectes
      - Abelisauroidea
        - Noasauridae
          - Laevisuchus
          - Masiakasaurus
          - Noasaurus
          - Velocisaurus
        - Abelisauridae
          - Eoabelisaurus
          - - Rugops
            - - Abelisaurus
              - Carnotaurinae
                - - Majungasaurus
                  - Indosaurus
                  - Rajasaurus
                - Brachyrostra
                  - - Ilokelesia
                    - Ekrixinatosaurus
                    - Skorpiovenator
                  - Carnotaurini
                    - Carnotaurus
                    - Aucasaurus

In the 2021 description of Llukalkan, the following consensus tree was recovered.

- Abelisauridae
  - Kryptops
  - - Rugops
    - - Majungasaurinae
        - - Genusaurus
          - Arcovenator
        - - Rajasaurus
          - Indosaurus
          - Majungasaurus
      - Brachyrostra
        - Xenotarsosaurus
        - - - Dahalokely
            - Rahiolisaurus
          - - - Ilokelesia
              - - Ekrixinatosaurus
                - Skorpiovenator
            - Furileusauria
              - Llukalkan
              - Pycnonemosaurus
              - Quilmesaurus
              - Viavenator
              - Carnotaurini
                - Carnotaurus
                - - Aucasaurus
                  - Abelisaurus

Timeline of genera

== Paleobiology ==
=== Feeding ===
Dental microwear features of abelisaurid teeth from the Marília Formation of Brazil indicate that they predated heavily on large prey. Fossil teeth found amid the bones of a titanosaur from the Allen Formation of Argentina suggest that abelisaurids preyed upon or at least scavenged titanosaurs.

=== Ontogeny and growth ===
Studies of the abelisaurid Majungasaurus indicate that it was a much slower-growing dinosaur than other theropods, taking nearly 20 years to reach adult size. However, other mature abelisaurid specimens indicate that they generally reached a faster rate of maturation. The holotype of Aucasaurus had a minimum age of 11 years, the holotype of Niebla had a minimum age of 9 years, and MMCh-PV 69 had a minimum age of 14 years.

== See also ==
- Timeline of ceratosaur research
