= José Bonaparte =

Argentine paleontologist (1928–2020)

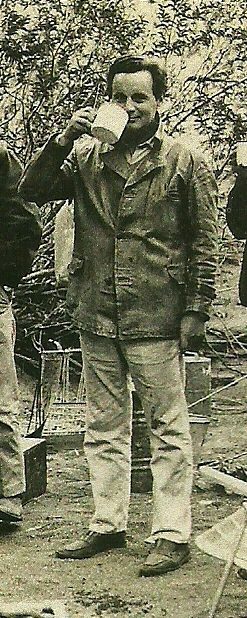
- Bonaparte in 1964
- Born: José Fernando Bonaparte; 14 June 1928; Rosario, Santa Fe Argentina
- Died: 18 February 2020 (aged 91); Mercedes, Buenos Aires, Argentina
- Scientific career
- Fields: Paleontology

José Fernando Bonaparte (14 June 1928–18 February 2020) was an Argentine paleontologist who discovered a plethora of South American dinosaurs and mentored a new generation of Argentine paleontologists. He has been described by paleontologist Peter Dodson as "almost singlehandedly...responsible for Argentina becoming the sixth country in the world in kinds of dinosaurs."

== Biography ==
Bonaparte was the son of an Italian sailor, with no close connection to Napoleon's House of Bonaparte. He was born in Rosario, Santa Fe, Argentina, and grew up in Mercedes, Buenos Aires. Despite a lack of formal training in paleontology, he started collecting fossils with many friends at an early age, and created a museum in their home town. He later became the curator of the National University of Tucumán, where he was named a doctor honoris causa in 1974, and then in the late 1970s became a senior scientist at the Museo Argentino de Ciencias Naturales in Buenos Aires. Bonaparte was a two-time Guggenheim Fellow and since the 1970s received periodic funding from the National Geographic Society. He reportedly was hard-working and stubborn and had a strong, even violent personality. He received another honorary degree from the National University of Comahue in 2011. Bonaparte died at dawn in his sleep on 18 February 2020 at age 91.

== Career ==
=== Discovery of southern diversity ===
Between 1975 and 1977, Bonaparte worked on excavation of Saltasaurus with Martín Vince and Juan C. Leal at the estancia El Brete. With fellow Argentine Jaime Powell, Bonaparte studied Saltasaurus and suggested that in life, it was covered in armored plates known as osteoderms. Based on this discovery, together with 20 specimens of Kritosaurus australis and a lambeosaurine dinosaur found in South America, Bonaparte hypothesized that a large-scale migration of species had occurred between the Americas at the end of the Mesozoic period. Bonaparte was also the first to propose the clade Abelisauridae, a grouping of ceratosaurians that were the dominant carnivores during the Cretaceous in Gondwana.

The supercontinent of Pangea split into Laurasia in the north and Gondwana in the south during the Jurassic. During the Cretaceous, South America pulled away from the rest of Gondwana. The division caused a divergence between the northern and southern biotas, and the southern animals appear strange to those used to the more northerly fauna. Bonaparte's finds illustrate this divergence and caused paleontologist Robert Bakker to dub him the "Master of the Mesozoic".

== Discoveries ==
Bonaparte described a wide array of dinosaurs and other prehistoric animals, including:

- Abelisaurus comahuensis (1985)
- Agustinia ligabuei (1999)
- Alvarezsaurus calvoi (1991)
- Amargasaurus cazaui (1991)
- Andesaurus delgadoi (1991)
- Argentinosaurus huinculensis (1993)
- Argyrosaurus superbus (1984)
- Carnotaurus sastrei (1985),
- Coloradisaurus brevis (1978)
- Guaibasaurus candelariensis (1998)
- Kritosaurus australis (1984)
- Lapparentosaurus madagascariensis (1986)
- Ligabueino andesi (1996)
- Mussaurus patagonicus (1979)
- Noasaurus leali (1980)
- Piatnitzkysaurus floresi (1979)
- Rayososaurus agrioensis (1996)
- Riograndia guaibensis (2001)
- Riojasaurus incertus (1969)
- Saltasaurus loricatus (1980)
- Velocisaurus unicus (1991)
- Volkheimeria chubutensis (1979)
- Ligabuesaurus leanzai (2006)

He also contributed to the description of Giganotosaurus.

== Philosophy ==
Bonaparte was a traditionalist and did not use modern cladistic methods, which apply the principle of parsimony to a vast array of synapomorphies. Partly for this reason, he declined to work on the modern treatise The Dinosauria, published in 1990. However in 2000, Bonaparte began to use cladograms. For instance, his studies of sauropods (e.g., Ligabuesaurus) and proto-mammals from Brazil show cladograms made by himself and co-authors. While he is best known for his dinosaur discoveries, he preferred to study the fossils of mammals.

His students included Rodolfo Coria, Luis Chiappe, Fernando Novas, Jaime Powell, Guillermo W. Rougier, Leonardo Salgado, Jorge Calvo, Sebastián Apesteguía, and Agustín Martinelli.
