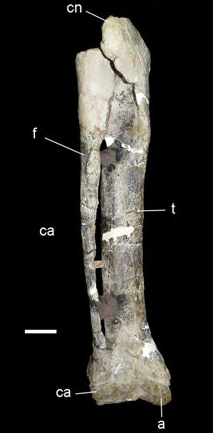
- Lower leg bones

Scientific classification
- Kingdom: Animalia
- Phylum: Chordata
- Class: Reptilia
- Clade: Dinosauria
- Clade: Saurischia
- Clade: Theropoda
- Family: †Abelisauridae
- Genus: †Xenotarsosaurus; Martínez et al., 1986
- Species: †X. bonapartei

Binomial name
- †Xenotarsosaurus bonapartei Martínez et al., 1986

= Xenotarsosaurus =

Xenotarsosaurus Temporal range: Late Cretaceous, 95 Ma

Extinct genus of dinosaurs

Xenotarsosaurus is a genus of abelisaurid theropod dinosaur that lived during the Late Cretaceous of Argentina.

== Discovery ==
In 1980 geologist Juan Carlos Sciutto discovered a rich fossil site six kilometres north of the Ocho Hermanos ranch in Chubut province. Among the fossils found there were some theropod remains. Later, a team led by Argentinian paleontologist José Fernando Bonaparte recovered some more theropod bones, possibly from the same individual.

In 1986, Rubén Martínez, Olga Giménez, Jorge Rodríguez and Graciela Bochatey described the theropod fossils and coined the genus and species Xenotarsosaurus bonapartei for them. The generic name is derived from Greek xenos, "strange", tarsos, "tarsus", and sauros, "lizard", a reference to the exceptional build of the ankle. The specific name bonapartei honours Bonaparte.

The type specimens (and only known fossils of Xenotarsosaurus) were found in the Bajo Barreal Formation. In 1986 this formation was seen as Campanian; today it is thought to date to the earlier Cenomanian–Turonian. The bones consist of two cotypes: UNPSJB PV 184, a series of two anterior dorsal vertebrae, and PVL 612, a right hind limb including the 611 millimetres (24.1 in) long femur, the tibia, fibula and astragalocalcaneum of the ankle. The exceptional complete fusion, without sutures, of the astragalus and calcaneum, forming an element that is again fused to the widened lower end of the tibia, occasioned the generic name.

== Description ==
In 2010 Gregory S. Paul estimated its length at 6 meters (19.7 ft), its weight at 750 kg (1,654 lbs). In 2016, its length was estimated to be 5.4 metres (18 ft). The same year Molina-Pérez & Larramendi gave a similar length of 5.4 meters (18 ft) and a weight of 430 kg (948 lbs).

== Classification ==
The remains show some similarities to Carnotaurus sastrei, causing the describers to assign Xenotarsosaurus to the Abelisauridae, which has remained a common determination. However, it has also been proposed that Xenotarsosaurus is a neoceratosaurian of uncertain affinities.

In 2021, Xenotarsosaurus was placed as an abelisaurid more derived than Eoabelisaurus based on phylogenetic analyses. A 2022 phylogenetic analysis also recovered the genus as an abelisaurid.

== See also ==
- Timeline of ceratosaur research
