= Jaime Powell =

Argentine paleontologist (1953–2016)

Jaime Eduardo Powell
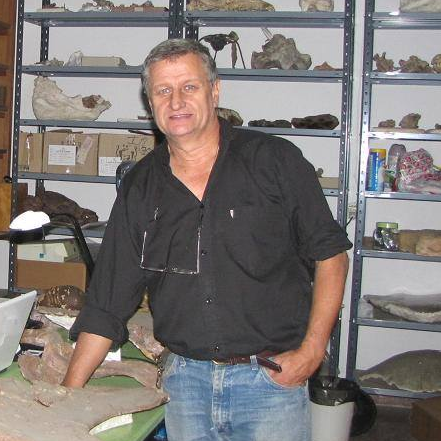
- Born: January 13, 1953; Córdoba, Argentina
- Died: 1 February 2016 (aged 63)

Jaime Eduardo Powell (January 13, 1953 – February 1, 2016) was an Argentine paleontologist who described the titanosaur sauropod dinosaur taxa Aeolosaurus and found evidence that titanosaurs have osteoderms.

== Research ==
Powell described the first convincing fossil evidence that titanosaurs had osteoderms.

=== Taxa named ===
- Aeolosaurus rionegrinus
- Unquillosaurus ceibalii
