= Genusaurus =

Genusaurus Temporal range: Early Cretaceous, 106 Ma

Scientific classification
- Kingdom: Animalia
- Phylum: Chordata
- Class: Reptilia
- Clade: Dinosauria
- Clade: Saurischia
- Clade: Theropoda
- Superfamily: †Abelisauroidea
- Family: †Abelisauridae
- Genus: †Genusaurus; Accarie et al., 1995
- Species: †G. sisteronis

Binomial name
- †Genusaurus sisteronis Accarie et al., 1995

Extinct genus of dinosaurs

Genusaurus (/ˌdʒɛnjʊˈsɔːrəs/ JEN-yuu-SOR-əs; meaning "knee lizard") is a genus of abelisaurid theropod from the Early Cretaceous. Its fossils were found in France. Genusaurus is believed to have lived during the Albian stage, around 112-100 million years ago.

== Description ==
Genusaurus possesses several distinguishing traits. The dorsal vertebrae are elongated. The elements of the pelvis are strongly fused. The thighbone shows a low bone plateau below the major trochanter; to the front an accessory trochanter is present. The epicondyle of the inner femoral condyle is well-developed. The cnemial crest strongly extends to the front and is curved upwards. The fibula has a distinctive boss serving as an attachment for the Musculus iliofibularis. The upper inner side of the fibula is strongly hollowed out.

=== Size ===
Genusaurus was originally estimated to have been 3.16 metres (10.4 ft) long. From the 38 centimetres (15 in) thighbone, a weight of 129.6 kilograms (286 lb) was extrapolated. Later estimates, while confirming the length of 3 metres (9.8 ft), have reduced the weight to 50 kilograms (110 lb), or even 35 kilograms (77 lb). In 2016, its length was estimated at 3.6 metres (12 ft), making it among the smallest known abelisaurids.

== Discovery and naming ==
The type species, Genusaurus sisteronis, is the only named species. It is based on a partial skeleton found in 1984-1986 in the Albian Bevons Beds, holotype MNHN Bev.1. The holotype contains seven partial dorsal vertebrae, a piece of a sacral, a piece of an ilium, the top of a pubic bone, a thighbone, the top of a shinbone, the top of a fibula and a metatarsal. It was named and described by Hugues Accarie, Bernard Beaudoin, Jean Dejax, Gérard Friès, Jean-Guy Michard and Philippe Taquet in 1995. The genus name is derived from the Latin word genu (knee) and refers to the cnemial crest in front of the proximal end of the tibia. The specific name refers to Sisteron, the town near which the specimen was found.

== Classification ==
Accarie et al. assigned Genusaurus to the ceratosaur group of theropods, more precisely to the Coelophysoidea. A 2008 cladistic analysis by Carrano and Sampson placed Genusaurus in the Noasauridae along with Laevisuchus, Masiakasaurus, Noasaurus, and Velocisaurus; in turn, noasaurids are part of the Abelisauroidea group, which is part of the ceratosaur group. Subsequent phylogenetic analyses found Genusaurus to be either a member of the Noasauridae or Abelisauridae. In 2025, Eric Buffetaut reexamined the holotype and suggested that it should be placed into Furileusauria, and confirming its abelisaurid classification.

== See also ==
- Timeline of ceratosaur research
