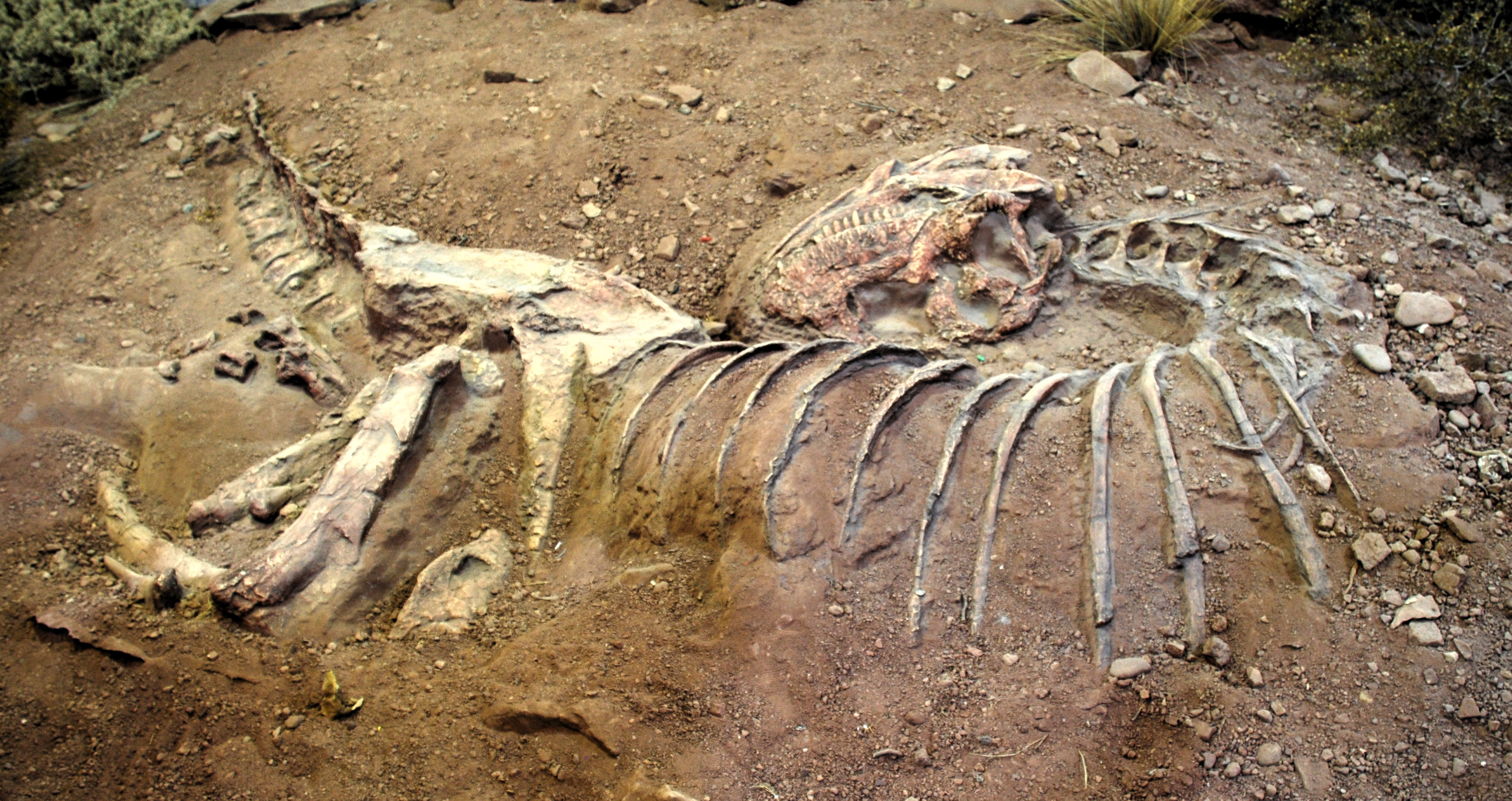
- Cast of the holotype specimen

Scientific classification
- Kingdom: Animalia
- Phylum: Chordata
- Class: Reptilia
- Clade: Dinosauria
- Clade: Saurischia
- Clade: Theropoda
- Family: †Abelisauridae
- Clade: †Brachyrostra
- Genus: †Skorpiovenator; Canale et al. 2009

Type species
- †Skorpiovenator bustingorryi Canale et al. 2009

= Skorpiovenator =

Skorpiovenator Temporal range: Early Cretaceous (Albian), 106.2 Ma

Extinct genus of dinosaurs

Skorpiovenator ("scorpion hunter") is a genus of abelisaurid theropod dinosaur from the Early Cretaceous (Albian) Huincul Formation of Argentina. The sole species of Skorpiovenator, S. bustingorryi, was named in honour of Manuel Bustingorry, the late owner of the farm on which the type specimen was discovered. Formally described in 2009, the type specimen is one of the most complete and informative abelisaurids yet known, described from a nearly complete and articulated skeleton. A tibia fragment was assigned to Skorpiovenator in 2022.

Skorpiovenator was a fairly large abelisaurid. What is preserved of the type specimen measures 4.35 m (14.3 ft) in length. Based on the anatomy of close relatives, it may have been between 6–6.2 m (19.7–20.3 ft) long in life, and may have weighed a little under 900 kilograms (2,000 lb). Its skull was short and blunt, and somewhat resembled that of Carnotaurus. Its bone texture was rugose, even by the standards of other abelisaurids, which indicates the presence of large facial scales. The skull is also covered in small pits called foramina, which suggests a strong degree of facial sensitivity.

== Discovery and naming ==
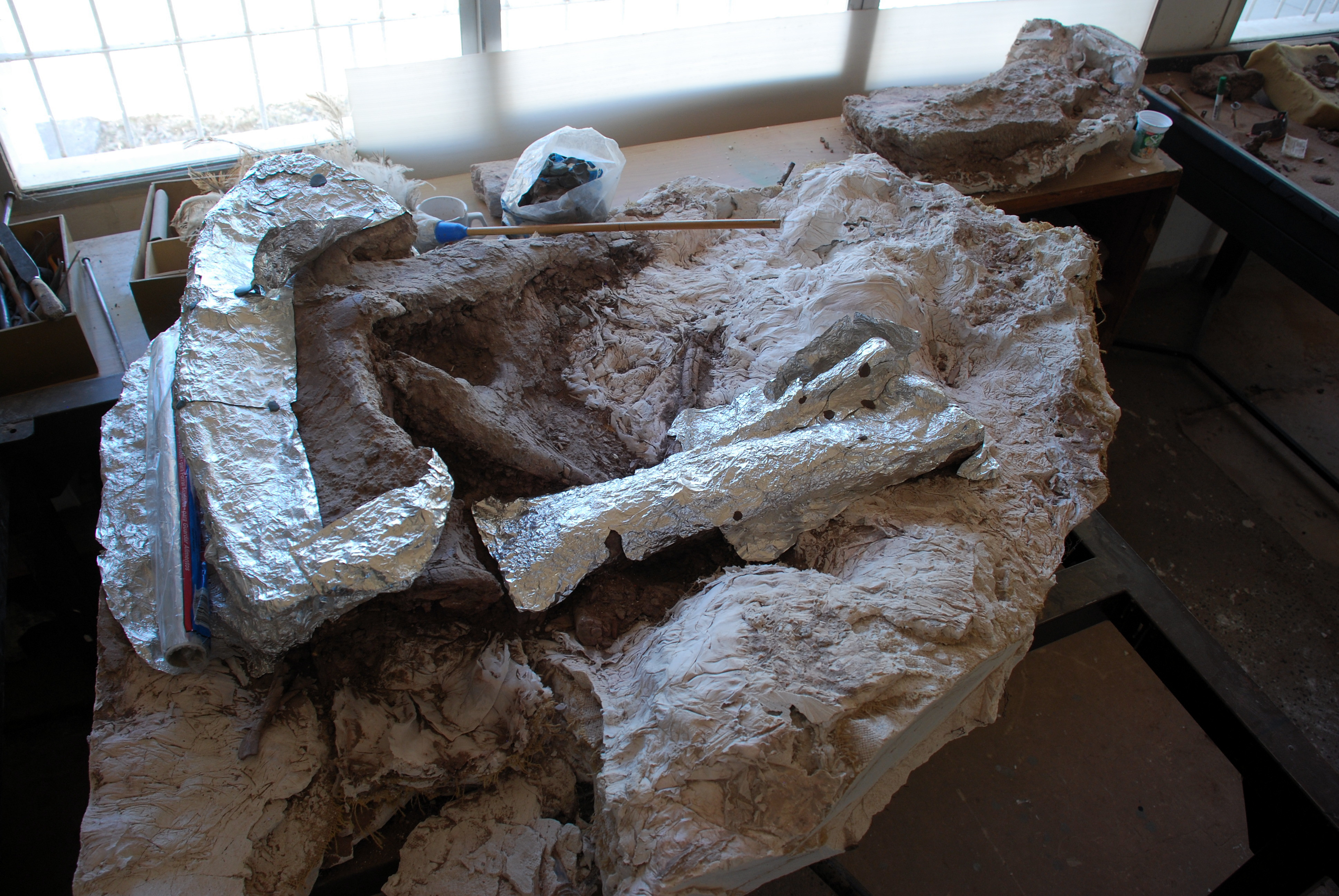
Fossil under preparation

The type specimen of Skorpiovenator bustingorryi (MMCH-PV 48K) was discovered in 2005 by Juan Ignacio Canale and Agustín Scanferla. At the time, they were field prospecting, on a farm owned by Manuel Bustingorry, 3 km (1.9 mi) northwest of Villa El Chocón, in the Neuquén Province. The specimen consists of a nearly complete skeleton, missing only part of the nasals and premaxillae, parts of the pelvic girdle, sections of the tail, and most of the forelimb elements. Given that it was preserved in articulation, the specimen was extracted in a single plaster jacket to lower the risk of its destruction. The strata from which MMCH-PV 48K was recovered belong to the lower part of the Huincul Formation in Patagonia, which was originally dated to the late Cenomanian stage, about 95 million years ago, though is now dated to the late Albian, about 106.2 million years ago. After its extraction, MMCH-PV 48K was relocated to the Ernesto Bachmann Paleontological Museum of Villa El Chocón, Patagonia, Argentina. The skull was separated from the cervical (neck) vertebrae during preparation to enable detailed analysis including computed tomography (CT) scans.

In a paper physically published in 2009 (released as an advanced publication online the year before), Canale, Scanferla, Federico L. Agnolin and Fenando E. Novas formally described the specimen, assigning to it the binomial name of Skorpiovenator bustingorryi. The generic name derives from the Latin words skorpios ("scorpion") and venator ("hunter"), referring to its nature as a predator and the abundance of scorpions at the dig site. The specific name honours Manuel Bustingorry, who had died by the time the paper was released. In naming Skorpiovenator, Canale and colleagues erected a new abelisaurid clade, Brachyrostra, to which it was assigned. In 2022, the proximal (far) end of a right tibia, MMCh-PV255, was assigned to Skorpiovenator.

== Description ==
Size of Skorpiovenator compared to a human

=== Body size ===
The preserved length of the excavated Skorpiovenator skeleton, measured from the premaxilla to the 12th caudal (tail) vertebra is 4.35 m (14.3 ft). Since it lacks most of the tail, precise length measurements are currently impossible, but it has been estimated to have grown up to 6–6.2 m (19.7–20.3 ft) long and weighed up to 891 kilograms (1,964 lb).

=== Skull and dentition ===
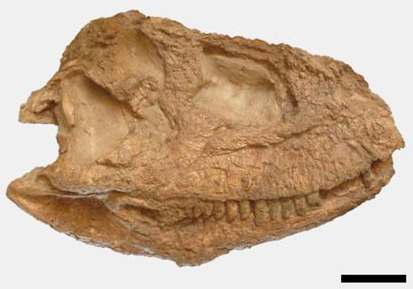
Skull

The skull of Skorpiovenator, measured from the premaxilla to the quadrate, measured 54.1 cm (21.3 in) in length. It was fairly short and blunt, similar to that of Carnotaurus, though was shorter and deeper than those of Abelisaurus and Majungasaurus. Much of the bone surface, especially on the top of the skull, is covered in small foramina, suggesting extensive innervation from the trigeminal nerve. This suggests the presence of sensitive facial tissues, akin to those seen in many other theropods, including the related Majungasaurus. The antorbital fossa is less developed than in other abelisauroids. The postorbital was large, and intersected the orbit (eye socket), to the point where it almost contacted the lacrimal on the opposite side. Consequently, the orbit had a distinctive "keyhole" shape, similar to that of Carnotaurus and the giant coelurosaur Tyrannosaurus rex. The dorsal border of the postorbital was inflated and well-ornamented, similar to that of Ekrixinatosaurus. The bone texture of Skorpiovenator's skull was very rugose, even when compared with other abelisaurids. The rugosities of the snout are hummocky, which are osteological correlates for scales, and the overall pattern of cranial ornamentation is almost identical to that of Rugops. Phylogenetic analysis suggests that the ornamentation observed on the frontal bones, also seen in Ekrixinatosaurus, may be apomorphic for abelisaurids more derived than Arcovenator, and an extreme version may account for the prominent horns seen in Carnotaurus.

Each of Skorpiovenator's premaxillae bore four teeth, whereas each maxilla bore 19 teeth, more than in any other abelisaurid. The shape of the tooth crowns is similar to other abelisaurids. They exhibit enamel wrinkles and serrations, and in those regards, resemble the teeth of carcharodontosaurids. The right dentary appears to have housed 21 teeth.

=== Postcranial skeleton ===
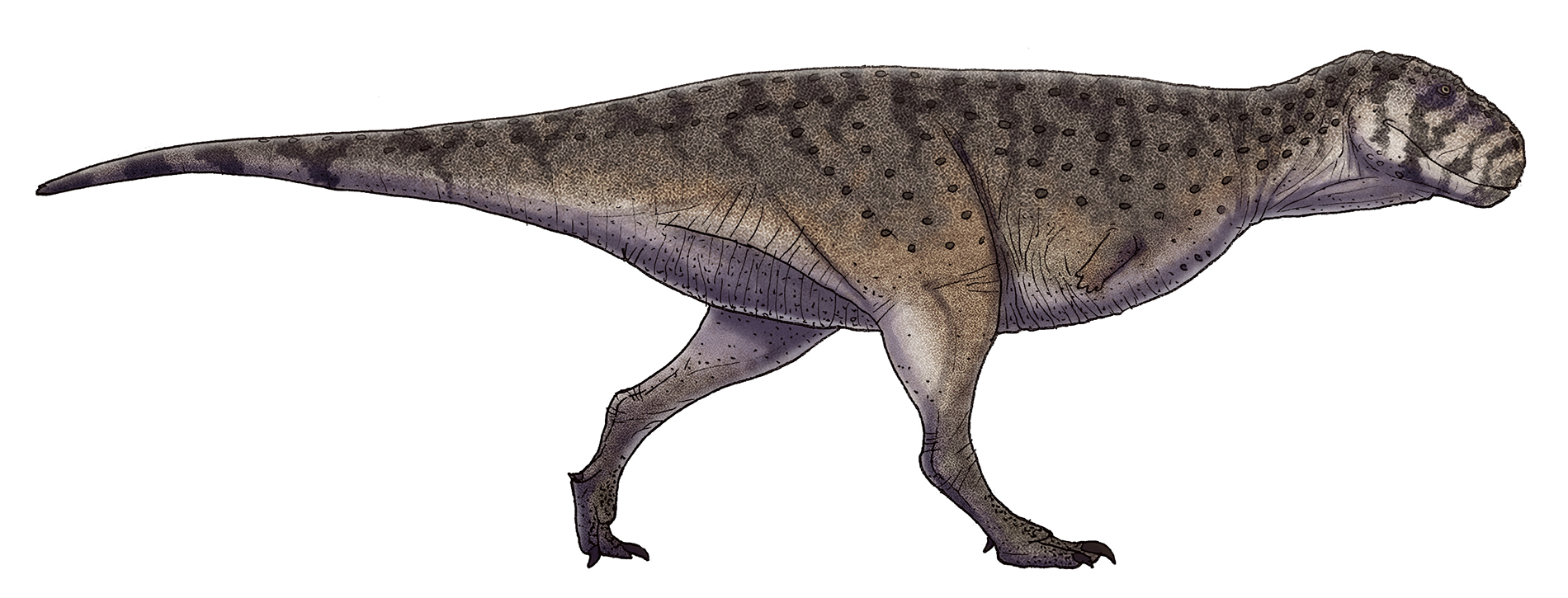
Restoration

With the exception of essentially all of the proximal section of the tail, parts of the pelvic girdle, and most of the forelimb elements, Skorpiovenator's postcranial skeleton is well preserved, though much of the postcranial axial skeleton (the vertebrae and ribs) remains undescribed. The caudal (tail) vertebrae that are preserved have outwardly-projected transverse processes, similar to Aucasaurus and Carnotaurus. The femur is stout, and is almost straight from the front, though is somewhat concave from the side. As in all ceratosaurs, its head is triangular proximally, and is oriented anteromedially (inward and forwards). The anterior surface of the femoral shaft has a well-developed intermuscular line that would have separated the origins of the femorotibialis internus and femorotibialis externus muscles, (knee extensors unique to sauropsids). The cnemial crest was very large, and the ilia had deep preacetabular and postacetabular blades, suggesting that, as in other ablelisaurids, the muscles that extended and flexed the legs were very powerful. The muscles responsible for foot pronation, such as the pronator profundus, appear to have been reduced, though remained present.

== Classification ==
In 2009, Canale et al. published a phylogenetic analysis focusing on the South American carnotaurines. In their results, they found that all South American forms (including Skorpiovenator) grouped together as a sub-clade of Carnotaurinae, which they named Brachyrostra, meaning "short snouts". They defined the clade Brachyrostra as "all the abelisaurids more closely related to Carnotaurus sastrei than to Majungasaurus crenatissimus". Within their topology, Canale et al. recovered Skorpiovenator as part of a sister clade to Carnotaurini, including Ekrixinatosaurus and Ilokolesia, and was the sister taxon of the former. In 2020, Hussam Zaher et al published a paper describing a basal abelisaurid, Spectrovenator ragei. In their topology, this clade was still recovered, though with Ekrixinatosaurus and Ilokolesia as each other's closest relatives. In 2021, Gianechini et al. described another abelisaurid, Llukalkan. Their phylogenetic analysis recovered the same clade, though recovered it as more basal. Whereas Carnotaurini fell within another clade, Furileusauria, in their topology, the clade consisting of Ekrixinatosaurus, Ilokelesia and Skorpiovenator was just outside it.

Below are the topologies recovered by Zaher et al. (2020) and Gianechini et al (2021):

Topology 1: Zaher et al. (2020).

- Carnotaurinae
  - Eoabelisaurus
  - - Spectrovenator
    - - Rugops
      - - Arcovenator
        - Rajasaurus
        - Majungasaurus
        - Indosaurus
        - Abelisaurus
        - Brachyrostra
          - - Skorpiovenator
            - - Ekrixinatosaurus
              - Ilokelesia
          - Carnotaurini
            - Dahalokely
            - Carnotaurus
            - Aucasaurus
            - Rahiolisaurus

Topology 2: Gianechini et al. (2021).

- Abelisauridae
  - - Majungasaurinae
      - - Genusaurus
        - Arcovenator
      - - Rajasaurus
        - Indosaurus
        - Majungasaurus
    - Brachyrostra
      - Xenotarsosaurus
      - - - Dahalokely
          - Rahiolisaurus
        - - - Ilokelesia
            - - Ekrixinatosaurus
              - Skorpiovenator
          - Furileusauria
            - Llukalkan
            - Pycnonemosaurus
            - Quilmesaurus
            - Viavenator
            - Carnotaurini
              - Carnotaurus
              - Abelisaurinae
                - Aucasaurus
                - Abelisaurus

== Palaeoecology ==
The Huincul Formation, from which Skorpiovenator is known, is thought to represent an arid environment with ephemeral or seasonal streams. The age of this formation is estimated at 106.2 million years ago. The dinosaur record is considered sparse here. Skorpiovenator shared its environment with the sauropods Argentinosaurus (one of the largest sauropods, if not the largest), Choconsaurus, Chucarosaurus and Cathartesaura. Three giant carcharodontosaurids, Mapusaurus, Meraxes and Taurovenator, were found in the same formation, though likely were not all coevals. Another abelisaurid, Ilokelesia, also lived in the region.

Fossilized pollen indicates a wide variety of plants was present in the Huincul Formation. A study of the El Zampal section of the formation found hornworts, liverworts, ferns, Selaginellales, possible Noeggerathiales, gymnosperms (including gnetophytes and conifers), and angiosperms (flowering plants), in addition to several pollen grains of unknown affinities. The Huincul Formation is among the richest Patagonian vertebrate associations, preserving fish including dipnoans and gar, chelid turtles, squamates, sphenodonts, neosuchian crocodilians, and a wide variety of dinosaurs. Vertebrates are most commonly found in the lower, and therefore older, part of the formation.

== See also ==
- Timeline of ceratosaur research
