= Abelichnus =

Abelichnus Temporal range: Early-Late Cretaceous, ?Albian–Cenomanian

Trace fossil classification
- Domain: Eukaryota
- Kingdom: Animalia
- Phylum: Chordata
- Clade: Dinosauria
- Clade: Saurischia
- Clade: Theropoda
- Ichnogenus: †Abelichnus; Calvo, 1991

Type ichnospecies
- †Abelichnus astigarrae Calvo, 1991

Dinosaur footprint

Abelichnus is an extinct ichnogenus of dinosaur footprint from the Candeleros Formation and the Rio Limay Formation. The type ichnospecies, Abelichnus astigerrae, was first discovered in Argentina in 1987 and was recorded as the biggest known dinosaur footprint ever discovered. Abelichnus probably grew to a size of 12.5-13 meters (41-42 ft) long.

== Description ==
In 1999 Calvo suggested that some theropod trackways and isolated tracks (which he made the basis of the ichnotaxon Abelichnus astigarrae in 1991) belonged to Giganotosaurus, based on their large size - these were discovered at Lake Ezequiel Ramos Mexia in 1987 by A. Delgado. The largest tracks are 50 cm (20 in) long with a pace of 130 cm (51 in), and the smallest is 36 cm (14 in) long with a pace of 100 cm (39 in). The tracks are tridactyl (three-toed) and have large and coarse digits, with prominent claw impressions. Impressions of the digits occupy most of the track-length, and one track has a thin heel. Though the tracks were found in a higher stratigraphic level than the main fossils of Giganotosaurus, they were from the same strata as the Giganotosaurus tooth MUCPv-52 and some sauropod dinosaurs that are also known from the same strata as Giganotosaurus.

== Taxonomy ==
Possible trackmakers of Abelichnus could have been Abelisaurus or Carnotaurus, although according to Calvo (1999), Giganotosaurus was the track maker.
