= El Chocón =

El Chocón may refer to:

- El Chocón Dam, in Neuquén Province, Argentina
- Villa El Chocón, a city in Neuquén, Argentina
