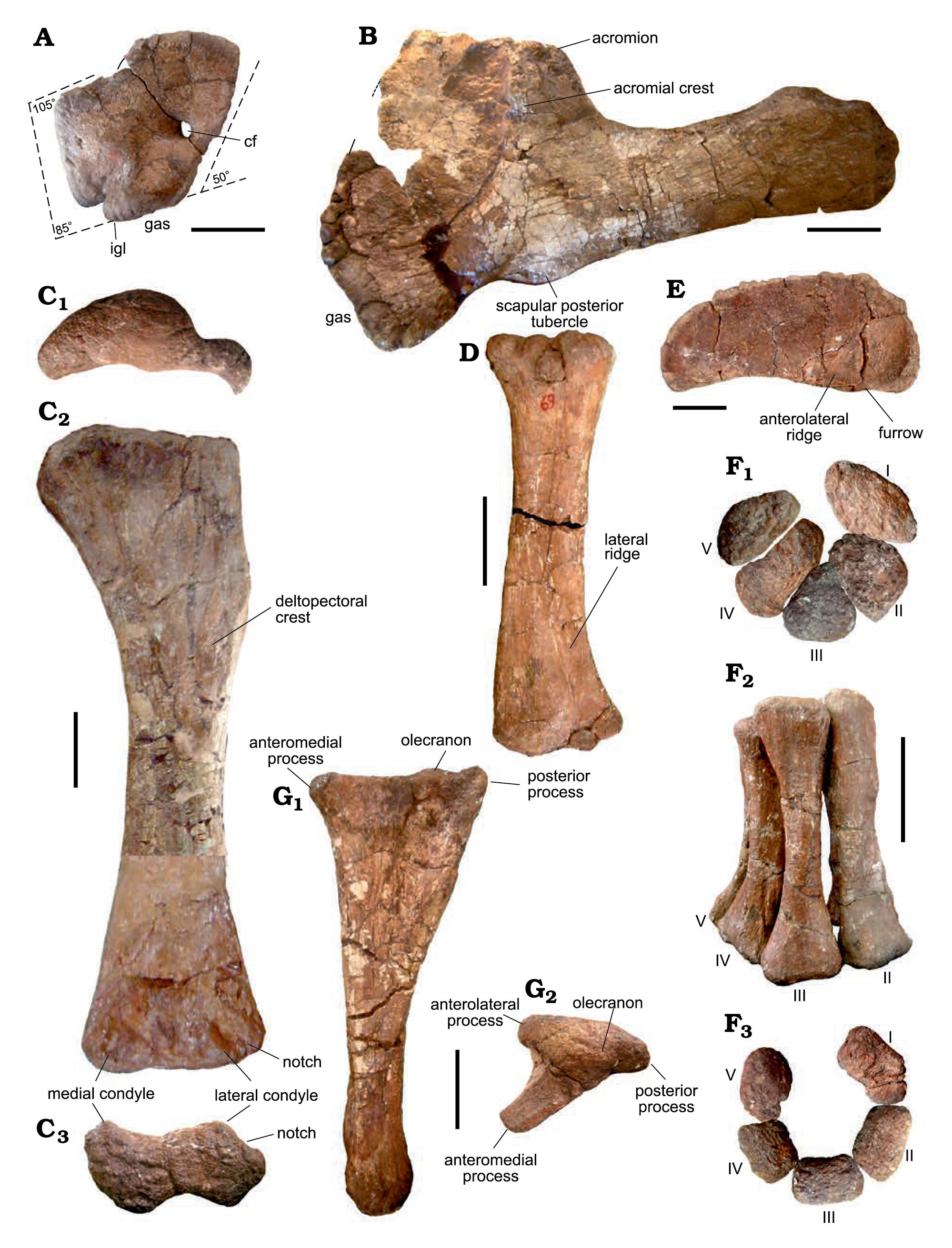
- Forelimb bones

Scientific classification
- Kingdom: Animalia
- Phylum: Chordata
- Clade: Dinosauria
- Clade: Saurischia
- Clade: †Sauropodomorpha
- Clade: †Sauropoda
- Clade: †Macronaria
- Clade: †Titanosauria
- Clade: †Lithostrotia
- Genus: †Bustingorrytitan; Simón & Salgado, 2023
- Species: †B. shiva

Binomial name
- †Bustingorrytitan shiva Simón & Salgado, 2023

= Bustingorrytitan =

Bustingorrytitan Temporal range: Early Cretaceous (Albian), 106.2 Ma

Extinct genus of dinosaurs

Bustingorrytitan (meaning "Bustingorry's giant") is a genus of lithostrotian titanosaur from the Early Cretaceous (Albian) Huincul Formation of Argentina. The type species is Bustingorrytitan shiva.

== Discovery and naming ==
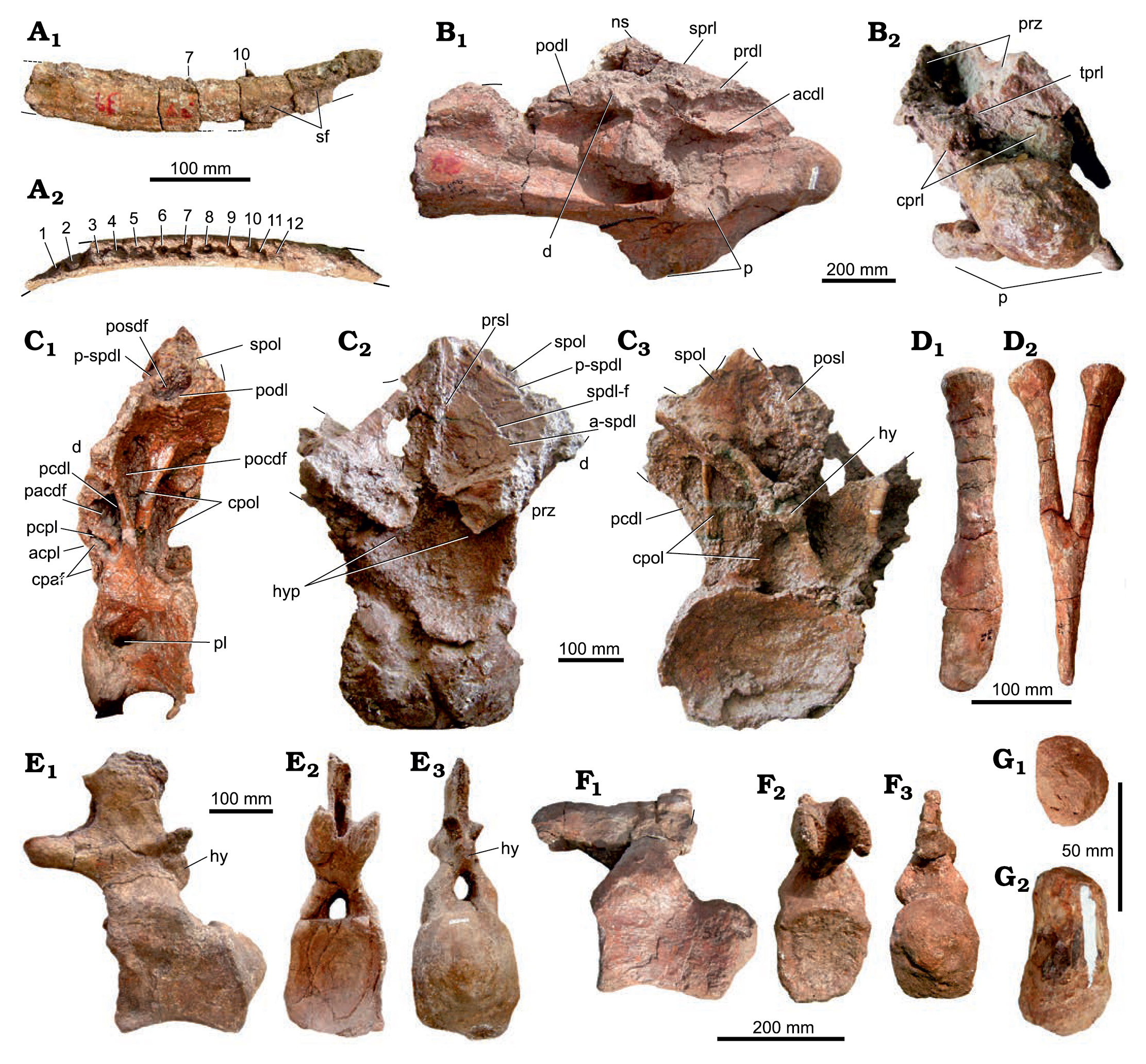
Axial remains

In 2001, several sauropod skeletons were uncovered at the "Bustingorry II" site at Villa El Chocón, including remains belonging to both Choconsaurus and Bustingorrytitan. This sauropod was announced in a conference the same year by Simón, and received the informal name of "Sauropodus". It was first described in 2011, in a thesis by María Edith Simón.

It was named as a new genus and species of titanosaur in 2023. The generic name, "Bustingorrytitan", honors Manuel Bustingorry, the person who owns the land where the fossils were found, combining his name with the Greek titan, in reference to its large size. The specific name, "shiva", is named after the Hindu god Shiva, who destroys and transforms the universe, in reference to the Cenomanian-Turonian faunal turnover.

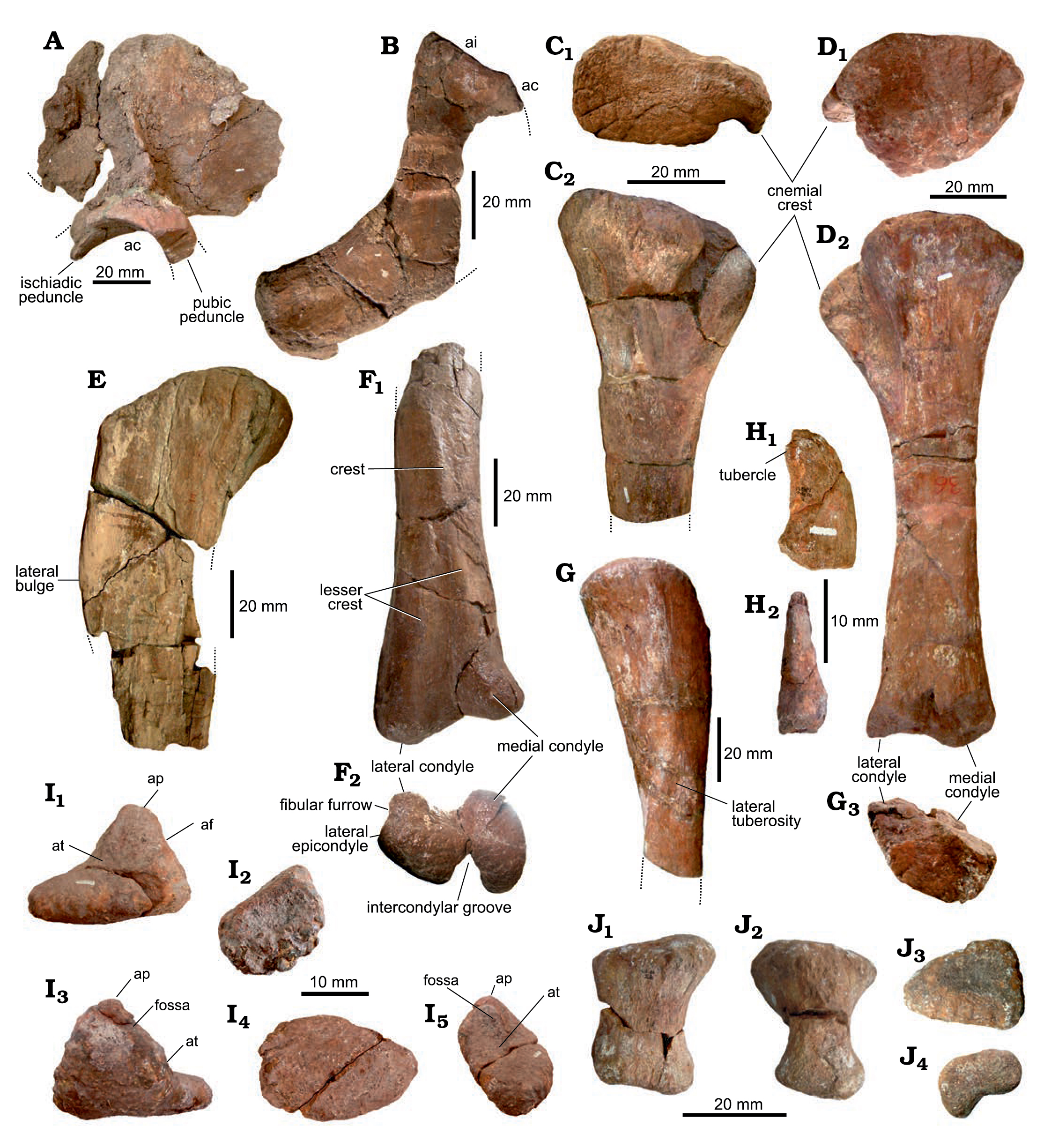
Pelvic and hindlimb bones

The holotype of Bustingorrytitan is MMCH-Pv 59/1-40, a partial skeleton including a tooth, vertebra, possible ribs, a scapula, a humerus, a femur, tibiae and a fibula. Four specimens are known, together including parts of the dentary and postcranial skeleton.

== Description ==
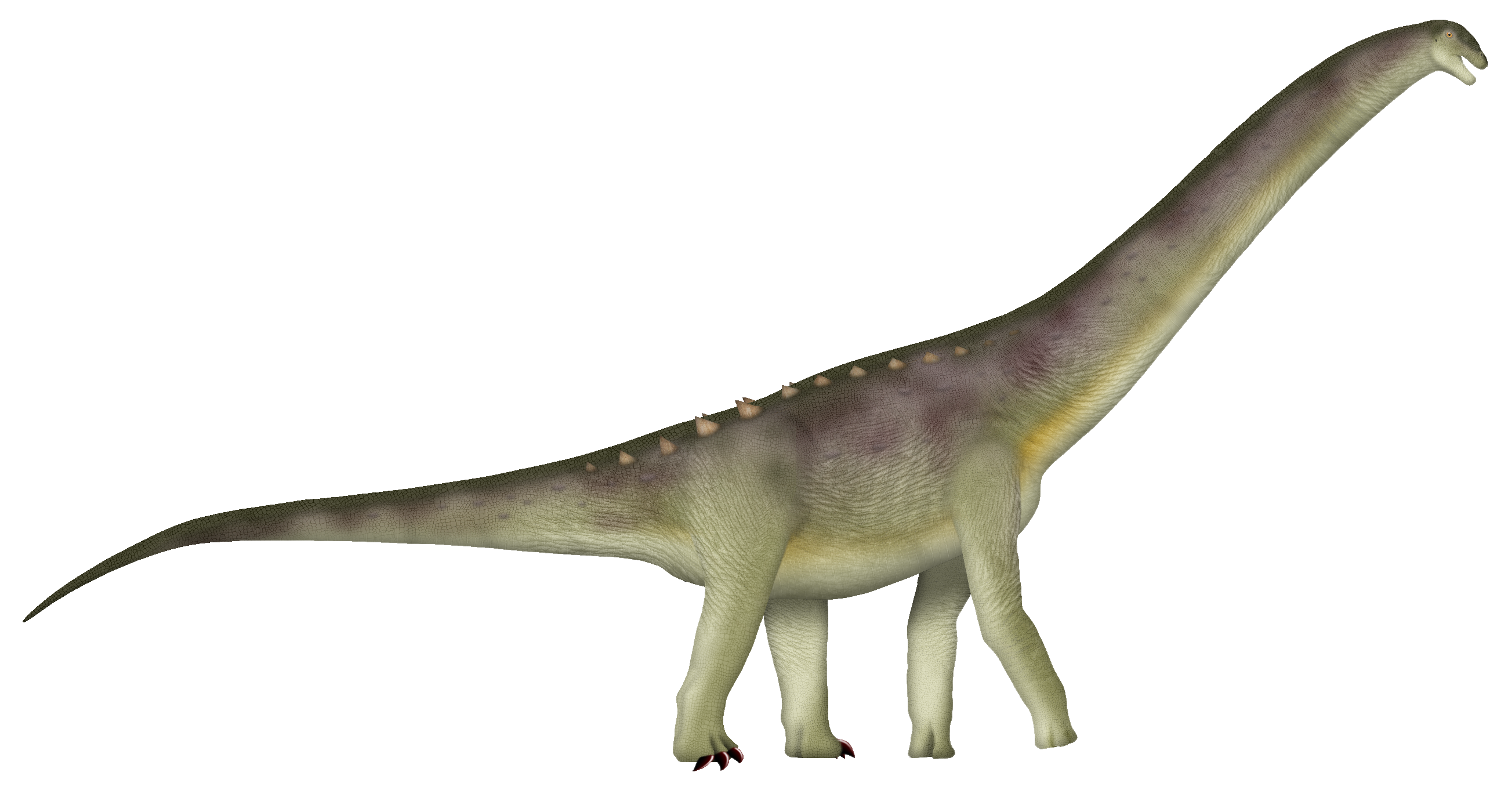
Life restoration

Using femur allometry, the weight of Bustingorrytitan was estimated to be approximately 67.3 tonnes (66.2 long tons; 74.2 short tons), making it one of the largest titanosaurs. It is also likely that the specimen doesn't belong to a fully grown animal. However, estimates based on limb bone allometry have been criticized as unreliable, and when applied to large sauropods regularly produce higher mass estimates than those produced by other methods.

== Classification ==
Bustingorrytitan was entered into a phylogenetic analysis and recovered as a member of the Lithostrotia, which itself is recovered as a subclade of the Saltasauroidea, in contrast to most analyses. The results of the analysis are shown in the cladogram below:

- Lithostrotia
  - Malawisaurus
  - - Alamosaurus
    - - Isisaurus
      - - Rapetosaurus
        - Baurutitan
      - - Bustingorrytitan
        - Saltasauridae
          - Opisthocoelicaudia
          - - Neuquensaurus
            - Saltasaurus

== Paleoecology ==
Bustingorrytitan was recovered from the Huincul Formation alongside two other gigantic titanosaurs, Argentinosaurus and Chucarosaurus. The three are not closely related to one another, which means that giant titanosaurs evolved multiple times within Eutitanosauria.
