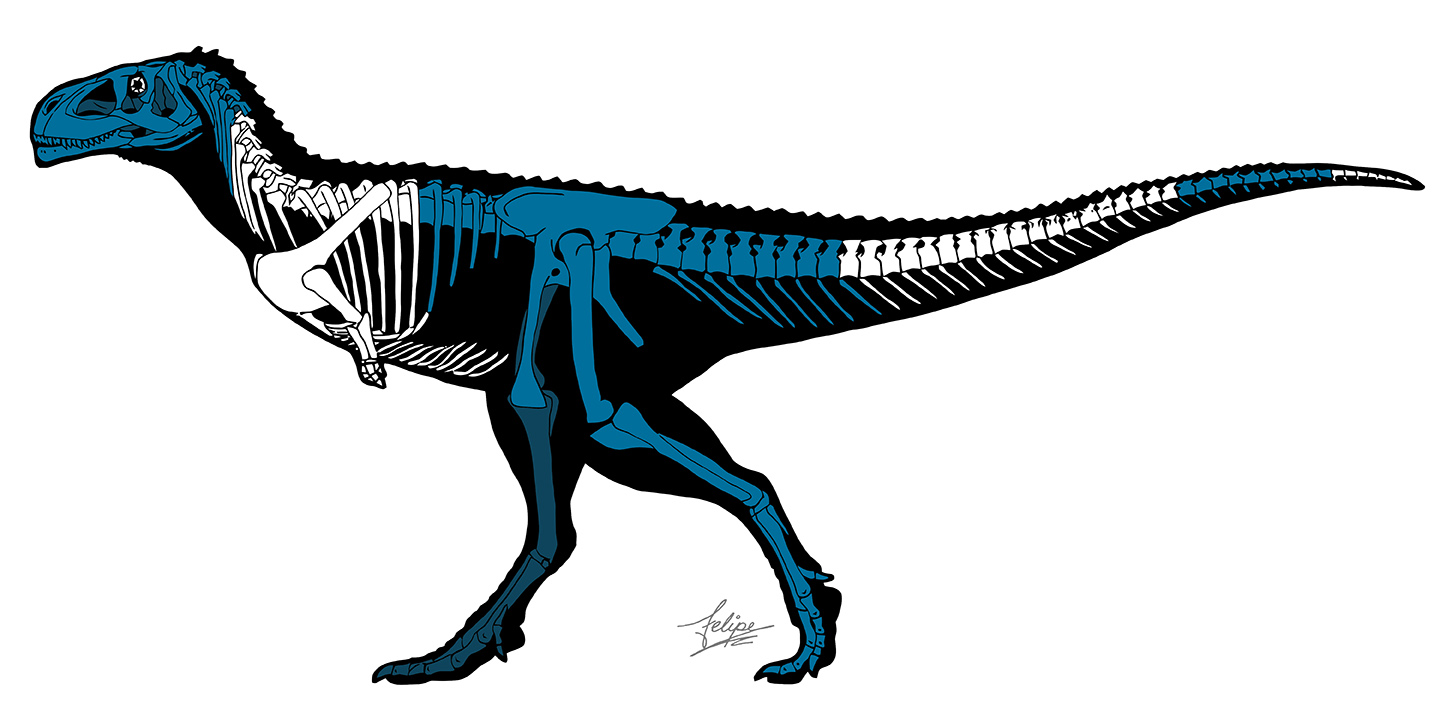
- Skeletal diagram depicting the known remains in blue

Scientific classification
- Kingdom: Animalia
- Phylum: Chordata
- Class: Reptilia
- Clade: Dinosauria
- Clade: Saurischia
- Clade: Theropoda
- Family: †Abelisauridae
- Genus: †Spectrovenator; Zaher et al., 2020
- Species: †S. ragei

Binomial name
- †Spectrovenator ragei Zaher et al., 2020

= Spectrovenator =

Spectrovenator Temporal range: Barremian-Aptian, 125 Ma

Extinct genus of reptiles

Spectrovenator ("ghost hunter") is a genus of basal abelisaurid theropod dinosaur that lived during the early Cretaceous period in what is now Brazil. The type and only known species is S. ragei, representing a small abelisaurid about 1.42–2.2 metres (4.7–7.2 ft) long.

== Discovery and naming ==
Spectrovenator is known from a single specimen, MZSP-PV 833, recovered from the Quiricó Formation and stored in the Museu de Zoologia da Universidade de São Paulo, and was discovered in the Embira Branca Range, close to the Coração de Jesus Municipality, located in northern Minas Gerais. The specimen consists of a nearly complete skull, partial series of cervicodorsal vertebrae with ribs, a complete sacrum, partial series of caudal vertebrae, and well-preserved hindlimb and hip bones.

The genus name Spectrovenator is derived from Latin words spectrum ("ghost") and venator ("hunter"), which refers to the unexpected discovery of its relatively complete skeleton under the holotype of Tapuiasaurus. The specific epithet ragei is named in honor of the French paleontologist Jean-Claude Rage for his contribution to the study on the continental Mesozoic vertebrate paleobiogeography.

== Description ==
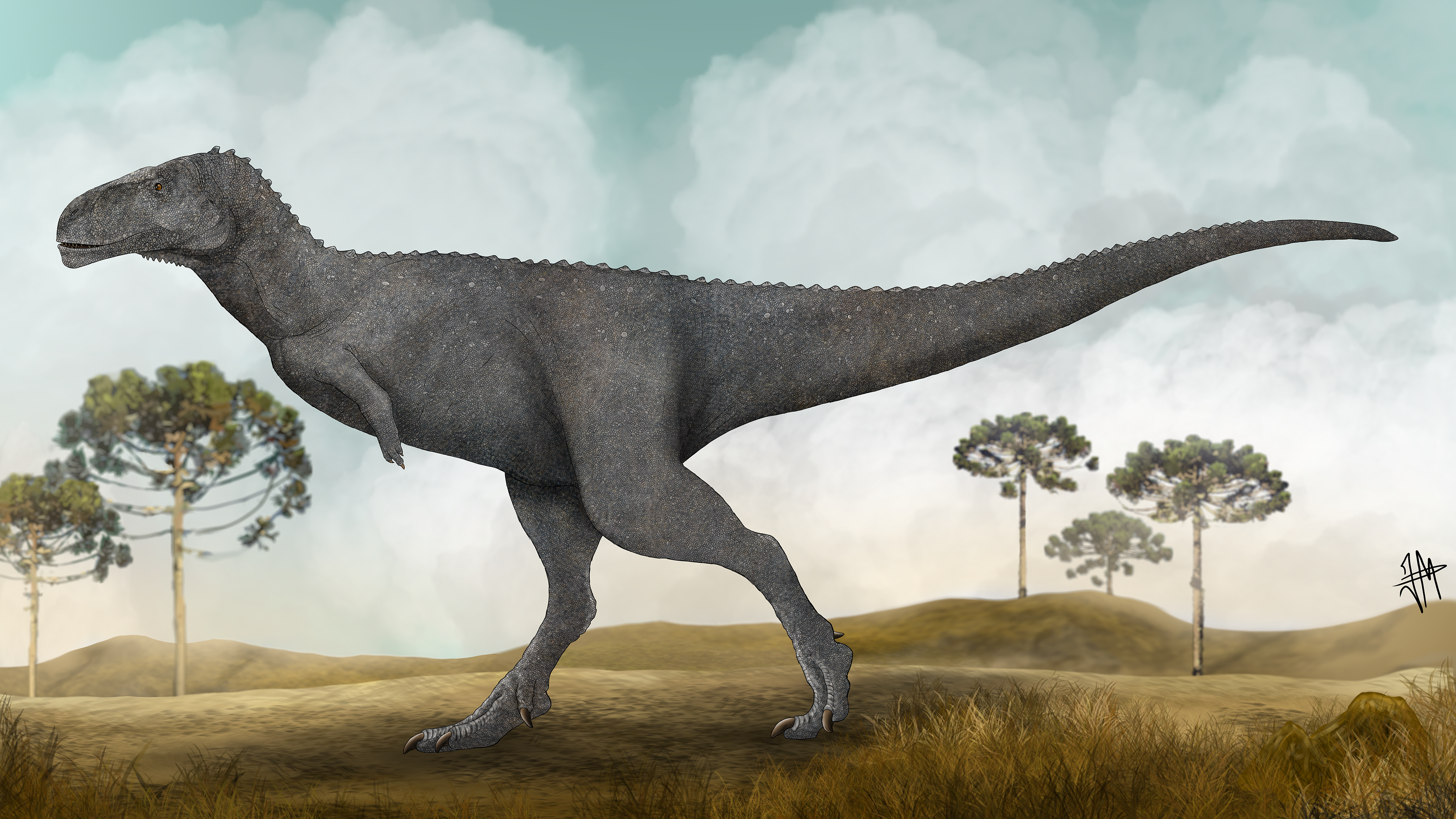
Life reconstruction

Spectrovenator is a small abelisaurid with an estimated body length of 1.42–2.2 metres (4.7–7.2 ft). The well-preserved skull of Spectrovenator has several features which show it is a transitional taxon between Jurassic and Late Cretaceous abelisaurids. It shares several cranial features with Rugops, another basal abelisaurid, indicating a similar position on the evolutionary tree. More derived taxa possessed adaptations that allowed for a broader chamber for the lower jaw muscles, but Spectrovenator lacked these. Instead, it contained plesiomorphic, or ancestral, traits in the temporal region of the skull. These features are a broad parietal surface between the supratemporal fossae and an elongated squamosal process of the postorbital. These characteristics suggested that Spectrovenator had a weaker bite force than more derived abelisaurids. The authors believe that this lends credence to the theory that bite force increased as abelisaurids evolved. The authors conclude that based on the number of basal traits exhibited by Spectrovenator, only the post-Cenomanian abelisaurids had the necessary adaptations for abelisaurids' characteristic feeding strategy.

Spectrovenator has distinct features in its skull that help differentiate it from the crania of other abelisaurids. These are: the posterior ramus of the maxilla is ornamented with vertically oriented grooves except for the smooth region in front of the maxilla-jugal suture; the lateral surface of the lacrimal is rugose except in the ventral section; a ventrally bowed posterior process of the jugal; a nuchal crest with a thin and smooth dorsal margin; a straight ventral margin of dentaries (part of the lower jaw) with a deep sulcus on the lateral surface; the dorsal margin of the surangular is slightly convex; and a longitudinal ridge along the posteroventral end of the mandibular ramus. In addition to these unique traits, Spectrovenator also preserves a transversely concave nasal and a row of large foramina on the skull roof. These may represent the presence of blood vessels and nerves, probably related to the passage of the lateral nasal and supraorbital vessels and the trigeminal nerve.

== Classification ==
The authors of the description of Spectrovenator included it in a phylogenetic analysis to test its position within Abelisauridae. Many characters supported its placement within Abelisauridae. The recovery of Spectrovenator as a basal member of Abelisauridae is consistent with its age and morphology. A simplified version of the analysis is shown below.

- Abelisauridae
  - Eoabelisaurus
  - - Spectrovenator
    - - Rugops
      - - Arcovenator
        - Rajasaurus
        - Majungasaurus
        - Indosaurus
        - Abelisaurus
        - Brachyrostra
          - - Skorpiovenator
            - - Ekrixinatosaurus
              - Ilokelesia
          - Carnotaurini
            - Dahalokely
            - Carnotaurus
            - Aucasaurus
            - Rahiolisaurus
