= Candeleros Formation =

Geologic formation in Argentina

- Stratigraphic range: Albian; ~111.4–106.2 Ma
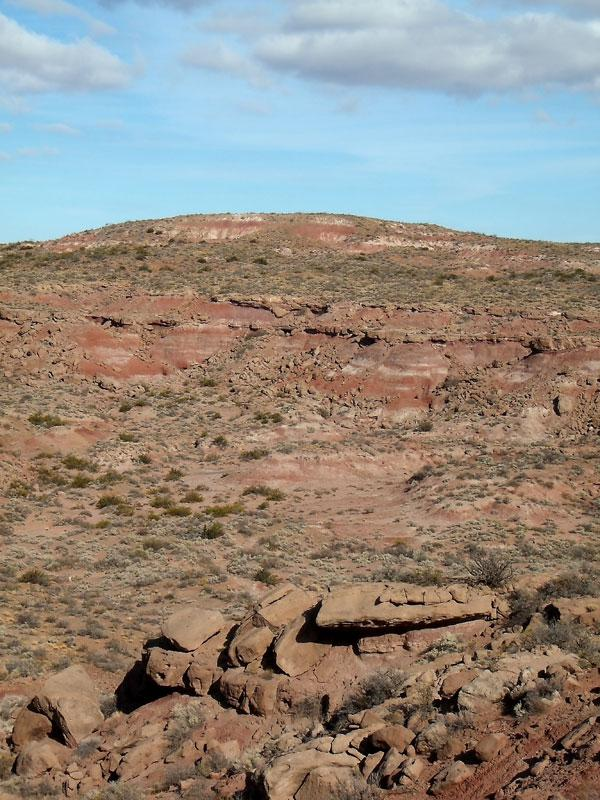
- Candeleros Formation near Cerro El Vagon, Neuquen, Argentina
- Type: Geological formation
- Unit of: Neuquén Group; Río Limay Subgroup
- Underlies: Huincul Formation
- Overlies: Lohan Cura Formation
- Thickness: 300 m (980 ft)

Lithology
- Primary: Eolian sandstone
- Other: Conglomerate, siltstone, paleosol

Location
- Coordinates: 39.4°S 69.2°W
- Approximate paleocoordinates: 46.5°S 45.5°W
- Region: Mendoza, Neuquén & Río Negro Provinces
- Country: Argentina
- Extent: Neuquén Basin

Type section
- Named for: Candeleros Hill
- Named by: Wichmann
- Year defined: 1929
- Candeleros Formation (Argentina)

The Candeleros Formation is a geologic formation that crops out in the Río Negro, Neuquén, and Mendoza provinces of northern Patagonia, Argentina. It is the oldest formation in the Neuquén Group and belongs to the Rio Limay Subgroup. Formerly that subgroup was treated as a formation, and the Candeleros Formation was known as the Candeleros Member.

== Description ==
The type locality of the Candeleros Formation is Candeleros Hill in Neuquén Province, after which the formation was named by Wichmann in 1929. This formation unconformably overlies the Lohan Cura Formation, and it is fused with the Huincul Formation, also a unit of the Neuquén Group. The sediments of the latter are of lighter greenish and yellow colors and the fused boundary between the Candeleros and Huincul formations is easily recognizable.

The Candeleros Formation is almost 300 metres (980 ft) thick in some sections. Overall, the formation represents a part of the ancient Kokorkom desert with braided river system, made up mostly of sandstones and conglomerates. There are also isolated sections that represent eolian (wind-blown) deposition, as well as siltstones deposited under swamp conditions. Paleosols (soil deposits) are common in some sections as well. The base of the formations age is correlated to the "Violaceous Sandstones" whose age is estimated at 98.6 ± 2.5 Ma. In 2010, Tunik and colleagues estimated the youngest maximum depositional age of the Candeleros Formation around 98.6 ± 2.5 Ma based on the youngest single grain from the underlying Rayoso Formation, supporting the proposed Cenomanian age. However, Ignacio J. Maniel and colleagues criticized the reliability of this dating method in 2026, since potential contamination or loss of lead isotopes can result in a dating over 10 million years younger than the actual maximum depositional age; the authors suggested that the Candeleros Formation is most certainly dated to the early Albian age, approximately 111.4 ± 1.1 Ma, using zircon U-Pb dating based on the youngest statistical population and maximum likelihood age of four samples (one tuff and three basal sandstones) from the Candeleros Formation and a single tuff sample from the overlying Huincul Formation, the latter of which was also dated to the Albian at approximately 106.2 ± 1.0 Ma.

== Fossil content ==
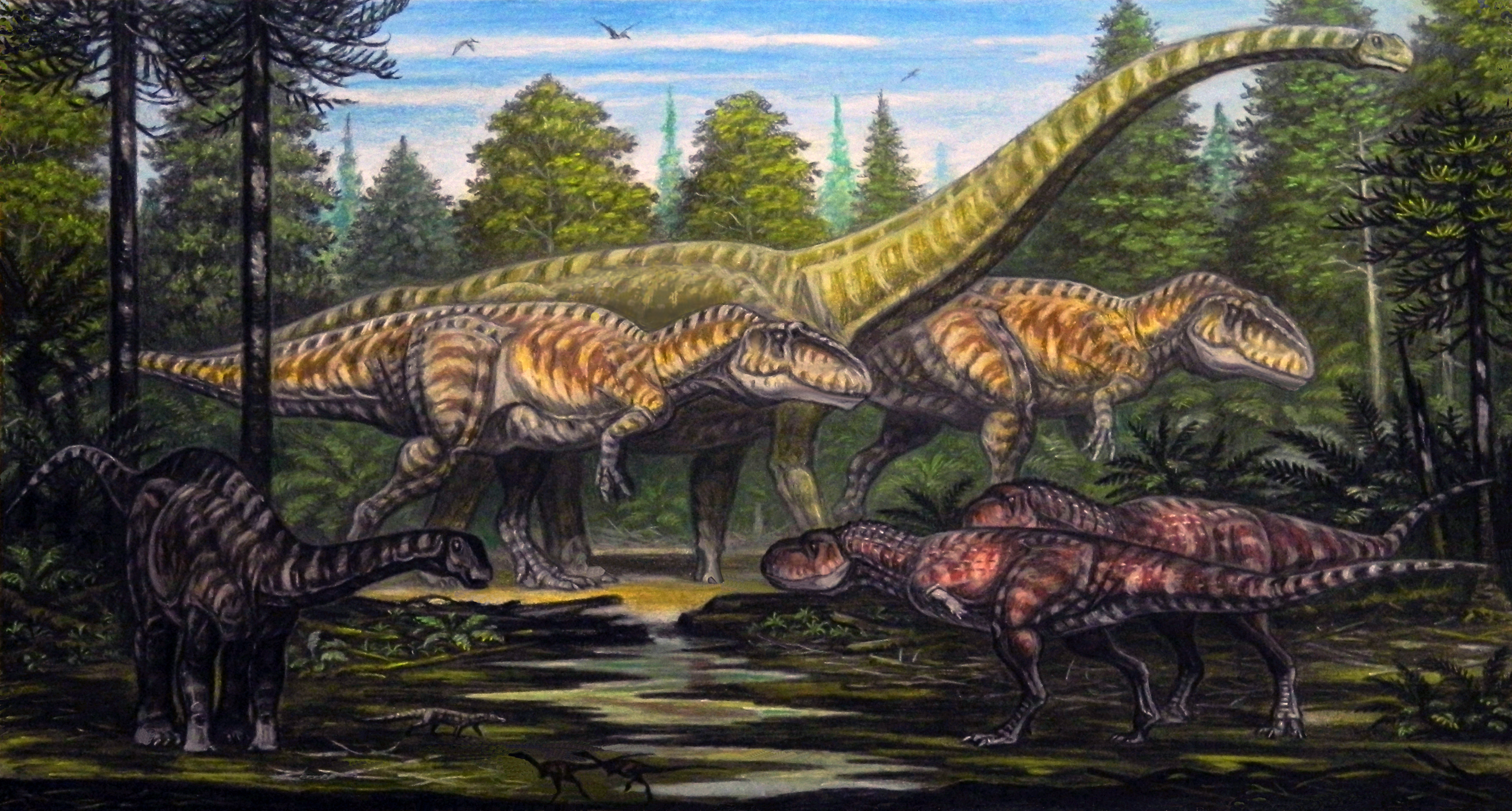
The dinosaurs of Candeleros Formation

The Candeleros Formation contains a diverse fossil fauna, including fish, frogs, mammals, rhynchocephalians, snakes, turtles, notosuchians, pterosaurs, and abundant dinosaurs including rebbachisaurid and titanosaurian sauropods and diverse theropods, and the basal thyreophoran dinosaur Jakapil kaniukura.

Ichnofossils found in the formation include those assigned to Sousaichnum monettae, Limayichnus major, Bressaniichnus patagonicus, Deferraiichnum mapuchense, and Picunichnus benedettoi.

Color key: Taxon / Reclassified taxon / Taxon falsely reported as present / Dubious taxon or junior synonym / Ichnotaxon / Ootaxon / Morphotaxon

Notes
Uncertain or tentative taxa are in small text
~~crossed out~~ taxa are discredited.

=== Fish ===
Taxa	Species	Locality	Member	Material	Notes	Images
Ceratodus	C. argentinus		Upper		A lungfish	

=== Amphibians ===
Taxa	Species	Locality	Member	Material	Notes	Images
Avitabatrachus	A. uliana	El Gigante	Lower	Fragmentary skull and postcranial skeleton	A pipimorph frog	

=== Dinosaurs ===
==== Ornithischians ====
Taxa	Species	Locality	Member	Material	Notes	Images
Jakapil	J. kaniukura	Cerro Policía	Upper	A partial skeleton including several osteoderms and a complete lower jaw	Possibly a basal thyreophoran	

==== Sauropods ====
Taxa	Species	Locality	Member	Material	Notes	Images
Andesaurus	A. delgadoi	Near Villa El Chocon	Lower	A partial skeleton	A basal titanosaurian sauropod	
Campananeyen	C. fragilissimus	Barda Atravesada de Las Campanas	Lower	A fragmentary skeleton	A rebbachisaurid sauropod	
Limaysaurus	L. tessonei		Upper		A rebbachisaurid sauropod	
Nopcsaspondylus	N. alarconensis	left bank of Limay River		A single lost vertebra	A dubious rebbachisaurid sauropod	
Rayososaurus	R. agrioensis	Agrio del Medio	Upper	A left scapula, an almost complete right scapular blade, and the distal three-quarters of a left femur.	A rebbachisaurid sauropod	
Titanosauria	Indeterminate		Upper		A giant titanosaurian sauropod, probably exceeding Patagotitan in size	

==== Theropods ====
Taxa	Species	Locality	Member	Material	Notes	Images
Abelichnus	A. astigerrae			A footprint		
Alnashetri	A. cerropoliciensis	La Buitrera	Upper	Several skeletal remains, from complete to incomplete	An alvarezsauroid	
Bicentenaria	B. argentina	Ezequiel Ramos Mexia Reservoir	Upper	Much of a skeleton	A coelurosaur	
Buitreraptor	B. gonzalezorum	La Buitrera	Upper	Several partial skeletons	A dromaeosaurid	
Ekrixinatosaurus	E. novasi	Bajo del Añelo	Upper	A partial skeleton	An abelisaurid	
Giganotosaurus	G. carolinii	Los Candeleros and Villa El Chocón	Upper/Lower	A partial skull and a disarticulated postcranial skeleton, a dentary, and teeth. Found in the upper part of the formation.	A carcharodontosaurid	

=== Pterosaurs ===
Taxa	Species	Locality	Member	Material	Notes	Images
Azhdarchidae	Indeterminate	Ezequiel Ramos Mexía Reservoir	Upper	A partial cervical vertebra	An azhdarchid	

=== Other reptiles ===
Taxa	Species	Locality	Member	Material	Notes	Images
Antusuchus	A. rionegrinus	La Buitrera		A holotype specimen, MPCA PV 1294, consists of an articulated skull and lower jaw and the second individual, MPCA PV 1295, is represented by the middle to posterior parts of a skull	A peirosaurid notosuchian	
Araripesuchus	A. buitreraensis	La Buitrera, Cerro Policía and El Pueblito.	Upper	Multiple skull specimens.	A small notosuchian crocodyliform	
Araripesuchus	A manzanensis		Upper	A partial skull and lower jaw	A small notosuchian crocodyliform	
Araripesuchus	A. patagonicus	El Chocón.	Lower	An anterior half of the skull with an articulated mandible, lacking the most anterior portion of the rostrum and also preserves part of the postcranium	A small notosuchian crocodyliform	
Najash	N. rionegrina		Upper		A basal snake	
Priosphenodon	P. avelasi		Upper		An eilenodontine rhynchocephalian	
Tika	T. giacchinoi		Upper		A sphenodontine rhynchocephalian	

=== Mammals ===
Taxa	Species	Locality	Member	Material	Notes	Images
Cronopio	C. dentiacutus	La Buitrera	Upper	Skull bones and teeth	A small meridiolestidan mammal	

=== Turtles ===
Taxa	Species	Locality	Member	Material	Notes	Images
Prochelidella	P. buitreraensis		Upper		A small chelid turtle	
Elkanemys	E. pritchardi		Upper		A bothremydid turtle	

== See also ==
- List of fossil sites
- Bajo Barreal Formation, contemporaneous fossiliferous formation of the San Jorge Basin
- Cerro Fortaleza Formation, contemporaneous fossiliferous formation of the Austral Basin
- Alcântara Formation, contemporaneous fossiliferous formation of the São Luís-Grajaú Basin, Brazil
- List of dinosaur bearing rock formations
