= Choconsaurus =

Choconsaurus Temporal range: Early Cretaceous (Albian), 106.2 Ma

Scientific classification
- Kingdom: Animalia
- Phylum: Chordata
- Clade: Dinosauria
- Clade: Saurischia
- Clade: †Sauropodomorpha
- Clade: †Sauropoda
- Clade: †Macronaria
- Clade: †Titanosauria
- Genus: †Choconsaurus; Simón et al. 2017

Type species
- †Choconsaurus baileywillisi Simón et al. 2017

Extinct genus of dinosaurs

Choconsaurus ("El Chocón lizard") is an extinct genus of herbivorous sauropod dinosaur belonging to the group Titanosauriformes, which lived in the area of present-day Argentina during the Early Cretaceous.

== Discovery and naming ==
The holotype (specimen MMCh-PV 44/10) was found in Villa El Chocón in Neuquén province, Argentina by Viviana Moro before 1996.

Subsequent field campaigns carried out at Manuel Bustingorry's "Bustingorry II" site by the Ernesto Bachmann Paleontological Museum and the Museum of Geology and Paleontology of the National University of Comahue between 1996 and 2002 discovered more remains pertaining to Choconsaurus, with several of the specimens described by Calvo (1999) under "Titanosauridae indet."; these field campaigns also recovered the holotype of Bustingorrytitan.

In 2017, the species type Choconsaurus baileywillisi was named and described by Edith Simón, Leonardo Salgado and Jorge Orlando Calvo. The genus name refers to its discovery in El Chocón. For its part, the name of the species is in homage to the American geologist Bailey Willis, who traced the stratigraphy of the area between 1910 and 1914.

== Description ==
The holotype specimen was found in a layer of the Huincul Formation dating to the Albian stage. It consists of a partial skeleton lacking a skull. The vertebrae of the neck, back and tail and parts of the limbs were preserved. This constitutes the most complete skeleton known of a basal titanosaur in 2017.

Size diagram

The describing authors have identified some distinctive features. In the cervical vertebrae, the upper edge of the face of the posterior joint was hardly developed. In the first vertebrae there are very large secondary protuberances on both sides of the hyposphene. The central and posterior vertebrae have an additional crest located between the posterior crest that extends from the lateral protrusion to the vertebral body and the secondary crest running parallel to the main crest. The frontal vertebrae of the tail have a protrusion in the posterior hyposphenic secondary joint.

== Classification ==
Choconsaurus was classified in its description article of 2017 within the clade Titanosauria in a basal position, outside the clade Eutitanosauria.

== See also ==
- 2018 in paleontology
- Paleoecology of the Huincul Formation
