= Ernesto Bachmann Paleontological Museum =

- Museo Municipal Paleontológico, Arqueológico e Histórico Ernesto Bachmann
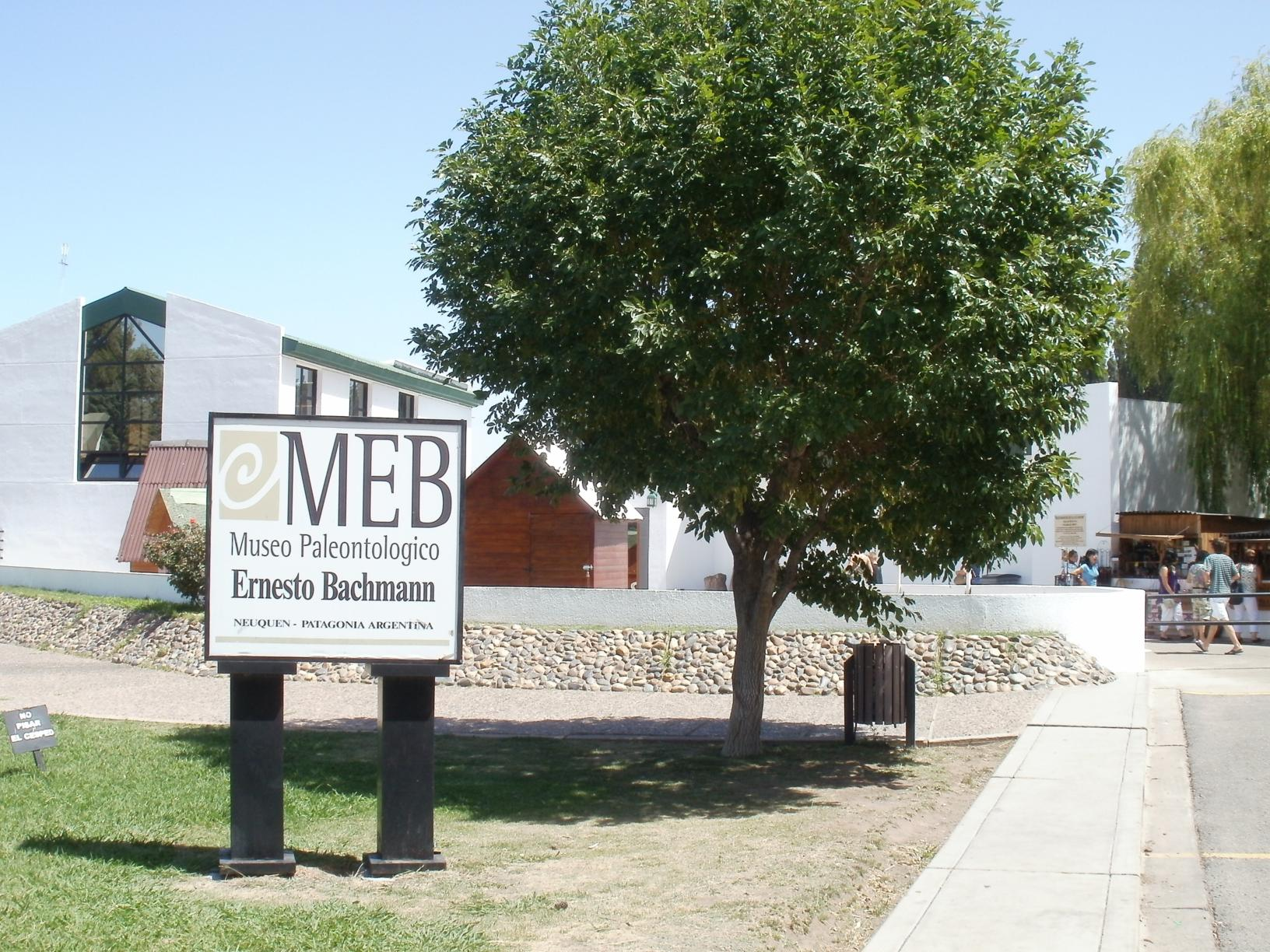
- Established: 10 July 1997
- Location: Villa El Chocón, Neuquén Province, Argentina
- Coordinates: 39°15′38.75″S 68°47′2.06″W
- Type: Science museum, Local museum

The Ernesto Bachmann Paleontological Museum (Museo Municipal Paleontológico, Arqueológico e Histórico "Ernesto Bachmann" or Archaeological, Paleontological and Historical Municipal Museum) (MEB) in Villa El Chocón, Neuquén Province, Argentina, is a municipal museum dedicated to the paleontology, archaeology and history of Villa El Chocón and its surroundings.

== History ==
The Museum was inaugurated on 10 July 1997, and since 16 May 1999 it bears the name of Ernesto Bachmann, who was an enthusiast of paleontology. The creation of the MEB was triggered by the finding of Giganotosaurus carolinii, one of the world's largest carnivorous dinosaurs, found in July 1993 by Rubén Darío Carolini18 kilometres (11 mi) to the southwest of Villa El Chocón.

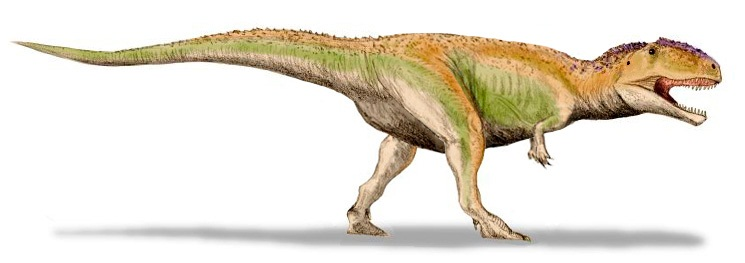
Reconstruction of Giganotosaurus

== Paleontology ==
The museum of Villa El Chocón was created as a consequence of paleontological findings of great scientific importance in the Exequiel Ramos Mexía Dam. Its most important exhibit is a carnivorous dinosaur of great dimensions, G. carolinii. In addition, other species of dinosaurs and vertebrates have been found and/or studied, such as Neuquensaurus australis, Amargasaurus cazaui, Bajadasaurus pronuspinax, the remains of an unspecified member of the Titanosauria, Skorpiovenator bustingorryi, the remains of Choconsaurus baileywillisi (caudal and dorsal vertebrae, and the original metacarpal bones and maxillae), Prochelidella sp., Kaikafilusaurus calvoi and Avitabatrachus uliana, among others.

== Exhibitions ==
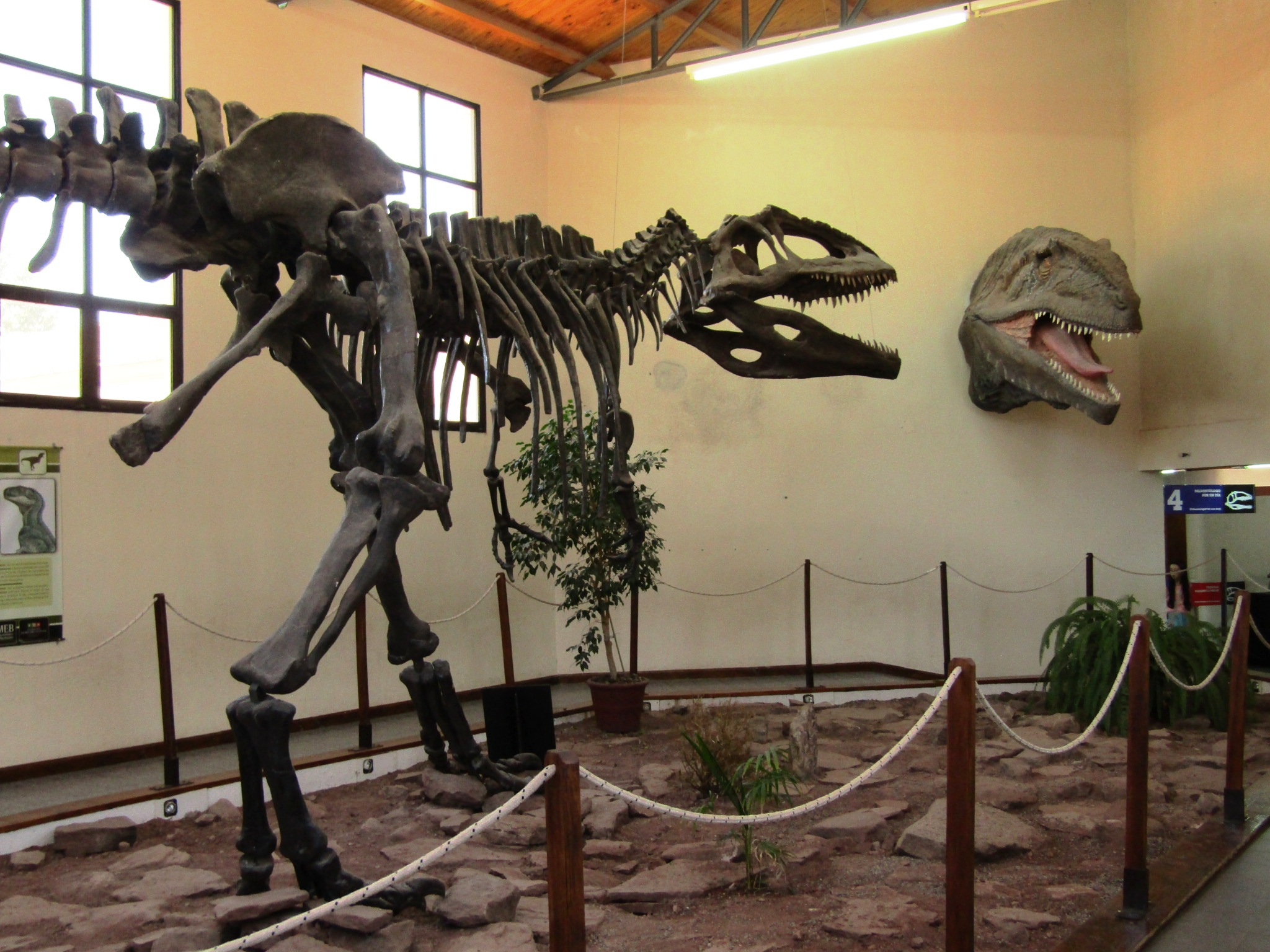
Reconstruction of skeleton of the carnivorous dinosaur Giganotosaurus carolinii, and restoration of head and neck exhibited at Ernesto Bachman Museum

=== Paleontology ===
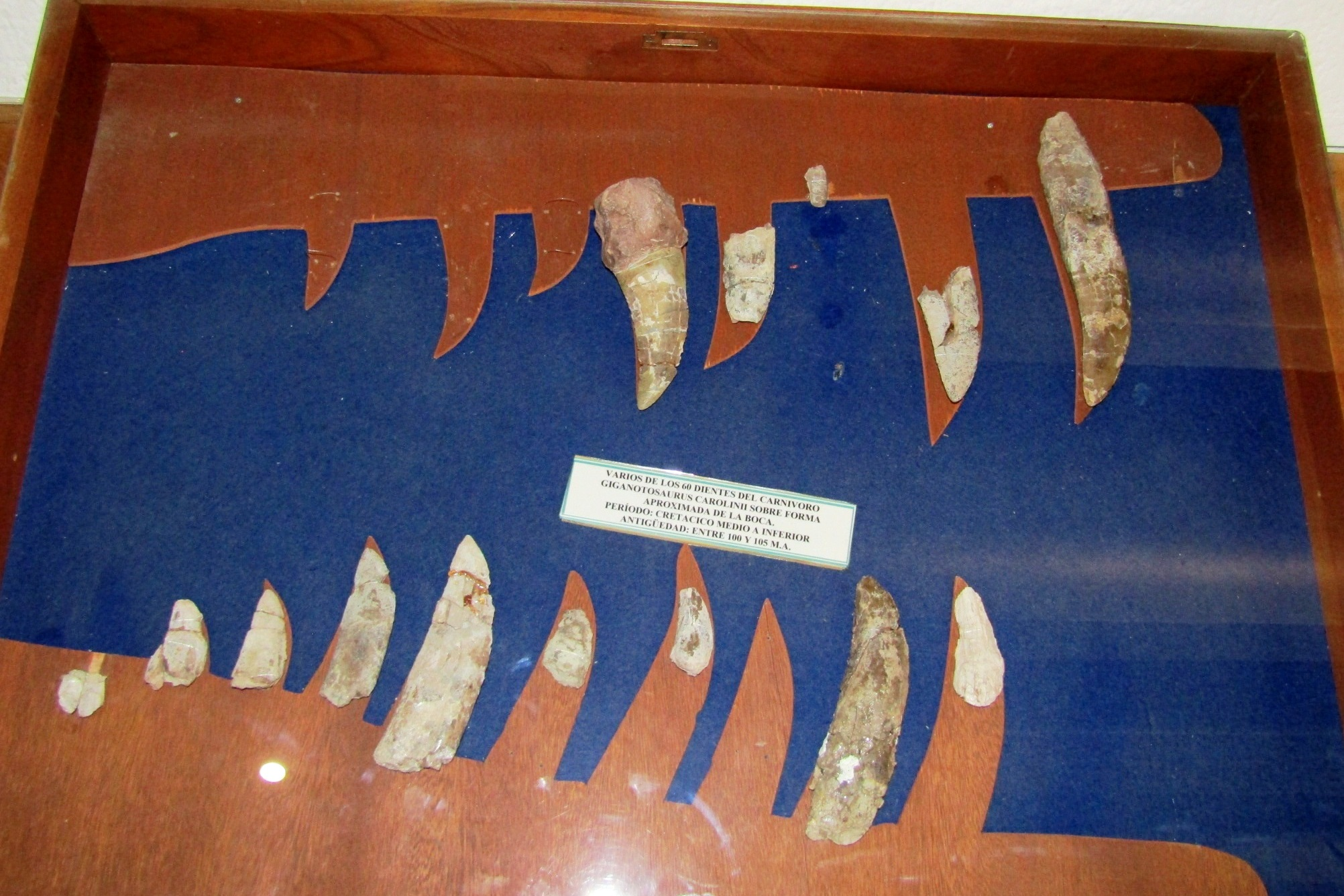
Teeth of the carnivorous dinosaur Giganotosaurus carolinii exhibited at Ernesto Bachman Museum

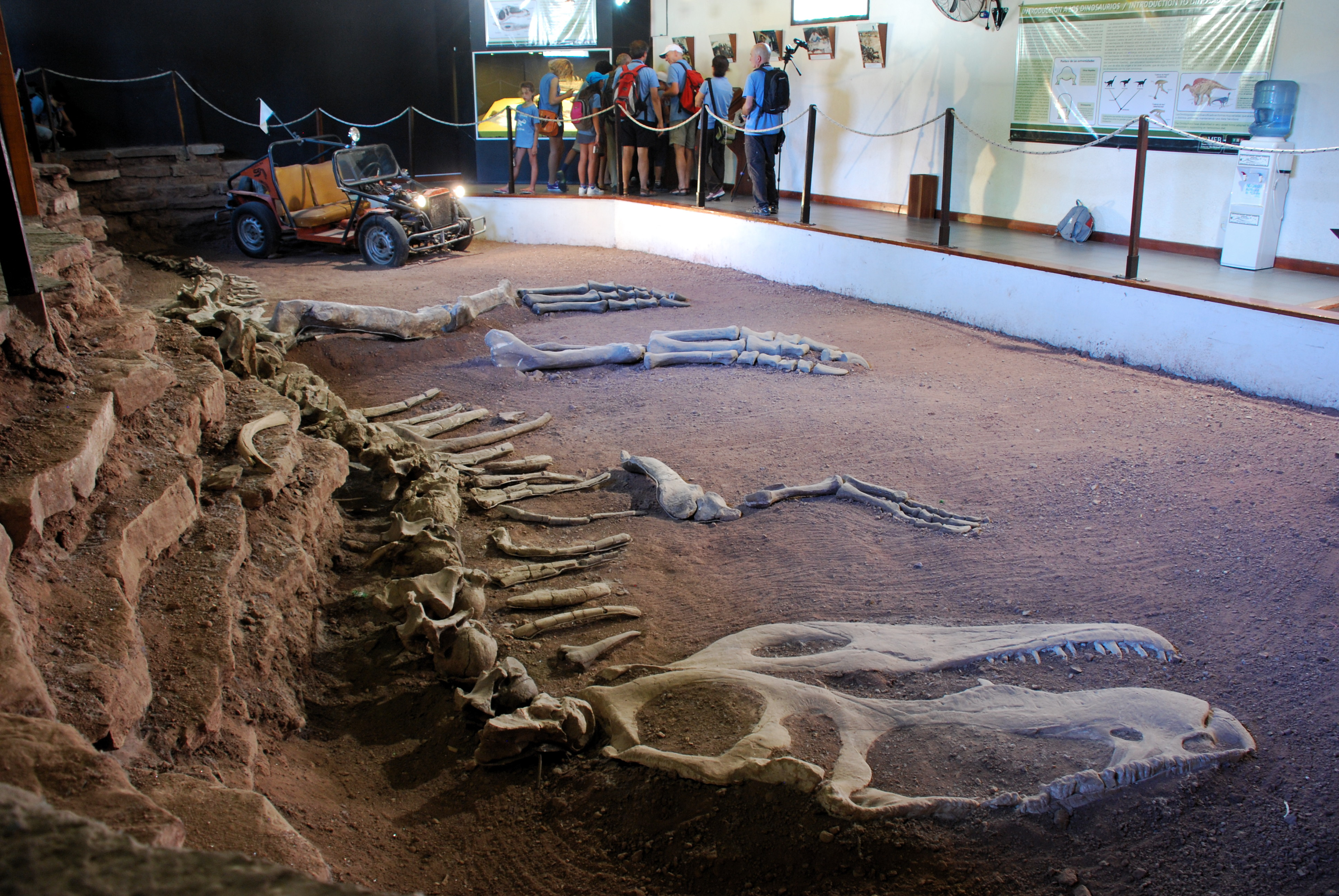
Remains of Giganotosaurus carolinii exhibited at Ernesto Bachmann Museum

The paleontological exhibition has reconstructions and original fossils of different extinct species. There is a reconstruction mounted on the articulated skeleton, and original remains of Giganotosaurus carolinii. Mounted reconstructions of Neuquensaurus australis and Amargasaurus cazaui, and a cast of the head and neck of Bajadasaurus pronuspinax are also exhibited. Besides, there are a replica of a vertebra of Argentinosaurus huinculensis and the original femur of an unspecified titanosaur. Moreover, there is a replica of the mounted skeleton of Carnotaurus sastrei and Skorpiovenator bustingorryi. This last species is exhibited in the same way as it was found at the excavation site. Apart from the species Carnotaurus, there are original caudal and dorsal vertebrae, metarcapus and maxilla of the sauropod Choconsaurus baileywillisi, whose specific name comes from the locality where it was found. In addition to dinosaurs, original materials of Prochelidella sp., Kaikaifilusaurus calvoi and Avitabatrachus uliana, and the replica of Araripesuchus patagonicus are exhibited.

== Archaeology ==
The MEB has archaeological collections from sites located near Villa El Chocón. Numerous archaeological sites near the location of Villa El Chocón have been described, such as Moro 1.

== Collections ==
=== Laboratory and investigation area ===
The museum has other facilities where activities are carried out, like the preparation, conservation and investigation of paleontological remains. In this sector, there is an official repository (named with the acronym MMCh–P: Municipal Museum of El Chocón–paleontology) where holotypes are kept, such as Skorpiovenator bustingorryi, Bajadasaurus pronuspinax, Choconsaurus baileywillisi, Leinkupal laticauda and Giganotosaurus carolinii. It also stores various remains under study, and materials that have not been assigned to any taxa yet.
