= Huincul Formation =

Geological formation in Argentina

- Stratigraphic range: Albian <106.2 Ma
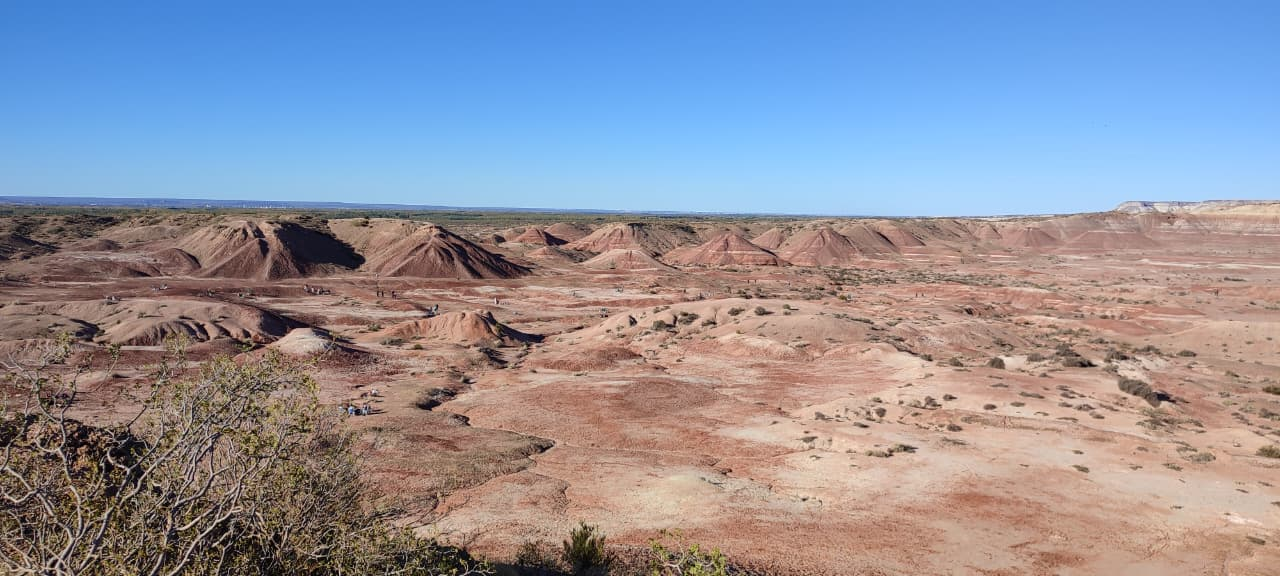
- Outcrops of the Huincul Formation (Neuquén Group) at Paso Córdoba
- Type: Geological formation
- Unit of: Neuquén Group; Río Limay Subgroup
- Underlies: Lisandro Formation
- Overlies: Candeleros Formation
- Thickness: 250 m (820 ft)

Lithology
- Primary: Sandstone
- Other: Claystone

Location
- Coordinates: 39.4°S 69.0°W
- Approximate paleocoordinates: 46.1°S 46.0°W
- Region: Mendoza, Río Negro & Neuquén Provinces
- Country: Argentina
- Extent: Neuquén Basin

Type section
- Named for: Plaza Huincul
- Named by: Keidel
- Year defined: 1929
- Huincul Formation (Argentina)

The Huincul Formation is a geologic formation of Early Cretaceous (Albian) age of the Neuquén Basin that outcrops in the Mendoza, Río Negro and Neuquén Provinces of northern Patagonia, Argentina. It is the second formation in the Río Limay Subgroup, the oldest subgroup within the Neuquén Group. Formerly, that subgroup was treated as a formation, and the Huincul Formation was known as the Huincul Member.

== Description ==
The type locality of the Huincul Formation is near the town of Plaza Huincul in Neuquén Province after which the formation was named by Wichmann in 1929. This formation conformably overlies the Candeleros Formation, and it is in turn overlain by the Lisandro Formation.

The Huincul Formation is thought to represent an arid environment with ephemeral or seasonal streams. In some areas, it is up to 250 metres (820 ft) thick. It is mainly composed of green and yellow sandstones and can easily be differentiated from the overlying Lisandro Formation, which is red in color. The Candeleros Formation, underlying the Huincul, is composed of darker sediments, making all three formations easily distinguishable.

== Paleobiota ==
Fauna of Huincul Formation

Dinosaur fossils are frequently found in the Huincul Formation. The titanosaurian sauropod Argentinosaurus huinculensis, one of the largest known land animals, is named after the formation. Another noteworthy Huincul dinosaur is the carcharodontosaurid theropod Mapusaurus roseae, which is regarded as one of the largest known terrestrial predators.

=== Dinosaurs ===
Apart from sauropods and theropods, rare fossils of iguanodonts and other ornithopods have been recorded in the formation. Ichnofossils (footprints) of abelisaurid theropods and hadrosaurs are also known.

==== Ornithischians ====
Color key: Taxon / Reclassified taxon / Taxon falsely reported as present / Dubious taxon or junior synonym / Ichnotaxon / Ootaxon / Morphotaxon	Notes; Uncertain or tentative taxa are in small text; ~~crossed out~~ taxa are discredited.

Ornithischians of the Huincul Formation
Taxa	Species	Locality	Stratigraphic unit	Material	Notes	Images
Chakisaurus	C. nekul	Pueblo Blanco Natural Reserve	Lower	Multiple partial skeletons belonging to individuals of different ages	An elasmarian ornithopod; the first ornithischian named from the Huincul Formation	

==== Sauropods ====
Color key: Taxon / Reclassified taxon / Taxon falsely reported as present / Dubious taxon or junior synonym / Ichnotaxon / Ootaxon / Morphotaxon	Notes; Uncertain or tentative taxa are in small text; ~~crossed out~~ taxa are discredited.

Sauropods of the Huincul Formation
Genus	Species	Locality	Stratigraphic unit	Material	Notes	Images
Argentinosaurus	A. huinculensis	Las Overas	Upper	Seven dorsal vertebrae, partial sacrum, partial dorsal rib, fibula, and potentially other hindlimb bones	One of the largest titanosaurs sauropod known from relatively complete remains	
Astigmasaura	A. genuflexa	El Orejano	Lower	A partial articulated skeleton including tail vertebrae, the pelvic girdle, and both hindlimbs	A rebbachisaurid sauropod	
Bustingorrytitan	B. shiva	Villa El Chocón	Lower	Four specimens are known, including dentary and postcranial skeleton parts.	A titanosaurian sauropod	
Cathartesaura	C. anaerobica	La Buitrera	Lower	A partial skeleton consisting of vertebrae and limb bones.	A rebbachisaurid sauropod	
Choconsaurus	C. baileywillisi	Villa El Chocón	Lower	Partial skeleton without a skull, MMCh-PV 44/10.	A titanosaurian sauropod	
Chucarosaurus	C. diripienda	Violante farm.	Lower	A complete left humerus, partial left radius, complete left metacarpal II, left ischium, partial left femur and fibula, partial right tibia, and partial indeterminate metapodial.	A titanosaurian sauropod	
Cienciargentina	C. sanchezi	Villa El Chocon	Lower	Multiple partial skeletons, including several vertebrae and limb bones	A rebbachisaurid sauropod	
Limaysaurus	L. tessonei	Villa El Chocón	Lower	A partial articulated skeleton composed of two sacra, the first six caudals, pubis and ischium.	A rebbachisaurid sauropod	Limaysaurus
Sidersaura	S. marae	Barda Atravesada de Las Campanas	Lower	Multiple partial skeletons, including partial pelvic and pectoral girdles, limb bones, and vertebrae	A rebbachisaurid sauropod	

==== Theropods ====
Theropods of the Huincul Formation
Taxa	Species	Locality	Stratigraphic unit	Material	Notes	Images
Aoniraptor	A. liberataem	Violante Farm	Lower	Sacral vertebra, six proximal caudal vertebrae, four mid-caudal vertebrae.	Possibly a megaraptoran	
Gualicho	G. shinyae	Violante Farm	Lower	A partial skeleton lacking the skull along with several veterbraes, ribs, the left shoulder girdle, the left forelimb, the right lower arm, the lower ends of both pubic bones, thighbones, shinbones, calf bones, metatarsi and three toes of the right foot (Holotype MPCN PV 0001).	A theropod of uncertain affinities	
Huinculsaurus	H. montesi	Aguada Grande	Upper	Several vertebrae	A noasaurid	
Ilokelesia	I. aguadagrandensis	Aguada Grande	Upper	Fragmented skull and the axial, appendicular skeleton.	An abelisaurid	Ilokelesia
Mapusaurus	M. roseae	Cañadón del Gato	Upper (middle section of formation)	A partial skull consisting of an isolated right nasal, along with twelve paratypes based on additional isolated skeletal elements	A carcharodontosaurid	
Meraxes	M. gigas	Las Campanas Creek	Lower	A nearly complete skull, pectoral and pelvic elements, partial forelimbs, complete hindlimbs, fragmentary ribs, and cervical and dorsal vertebrae, a sacrum, and several complete caudal vertebrae.	A carcharodontosaurid	Meraxes gigas reconstruction
Overoraptor	O. chimentoi	Violante Farm	Lower	Skeletal specimen consists of two phalanges and a metacarpal of the right hand, two hemal arches, the right scapula, the right ulna, a partial ilium, a partial pubis, two metatarsals from each foot, and several phalanges and unguals from the left foot.	A paravian	
Skorpiovenator	S. bustingorryi	Bustingorry's Farm	Lower	A partial skeleton	An abelisaurid	
Taurovenator	T. violantei	Violante Farm	Lower	An isolated right postorbital and a referred partial skeleton.	A carcharodontosaurid	
Tralkasaurus	T. cuyi	Violante Farm	Lower	An incomplete skeleton ( MPCA-Pv 815), which comprises a maxilla; dorsal, sacral, and caudal vertebrae; cervical ribs; and a badly-preserved pubis.	An abelisaurid	

=== Other reptiles ===
Apart from the taxa named here, fossils of unnamed squamates and neosuchian crocodyliforms have been discovered in the formation.

Non-dinosaur reptiles of the Huincul Formation
Genus	Species	Locality	Stratigraphic unit	Material	Notes	Images
Kaikaifilusaurus	K. sp.	Violante's Farm	Lower	Incomplete right dentary	An eilenodontine rhynchocephalian	
Patagosphenos	P. watuku	Violante's Farm	Lower	Disarticulated skull with shoulder and limb fragments	An eilenodontine rhynchocephalian	
Prochelidella	P. buitreraensis	La Buitrera	Upper	A partial skeleton with a skull, two cervical vertebrae, a partial left humerus, a partial left ulna, a partial left radius, a right pelvic girdle, a nuchal, and a right first costal.	A chelid turtle	

== Paleoflora ==
At least forty species of pollen specimens are derived from the taxons of angiosperms (monosulcate, tricolpate, tricolporoidate, and tricolporate), ferns, mosses and gymnosperms discovered within the El Zampa Section of Huincul Formation.

=== Angiosperms ===
Angiosperms of the Huincul Formation
Taxa	Species	Locality	Stratigraphic unit	Material	Notes	Images
Clavatipollenites	C. rotundus	El Zampal Section	Upper	A pollen	A chloranthaceae	
Cretacaeiporites	C. scabratus	El Zampal Section	Upper	A pollen	A trimeniaceae	
Dryadopollis	D. argus	El Zampal Section	Upper	A pollen	A magnoliophyte	
Fraxinoipollenites	F. fragilis	El Zampal Section	Upper	A pollen	A magnoliophyte	
Nyssapollenites	N. lanosus	El Zampal Section	Upper	A pollen	A magnoliophyte	
Retimonocolpites	R. peroreticulatus	El Zampal Section	Upper	A pollen	An angiosperm pollen morphotaxon of uncertain affinities	

=== Bryophytes (Moss) ===
Mosses of the Huincul Formation
Taxa	Species	Locality	Stratigraphic unit	Material	Notes	Images
Foraminisporis	F. asymmetricus	El Zampa Section	Upper	A pollen	A moss	
Foraminisporis	F. wonthaggie	El Zampa Section	Upper	A pollen	A moss	
Interulobites	I. intrabverrucatus	El Zampa Section	Upper	A pollen	A moss	
Tricolpites	T. variabilis	El Zampa Section	Upper	A pollen	A bryopside moss	
Tricolpites	T. sagax	El Zampa Section	Upper	A pollen	A bryopside moss	
Taurocusporites	T. segmenta	El Zampa Section	Upper	A pollen	A moss	

=== Gymnosperms ===
Gymnosperms of the Huincul Formation
Taxa	Species	Locality	Stratigraphic unit	Material	Notes	Images
Araucariacites	A. australis	El Zampa Section	Upper	A pollen	An araucariaceae	
Callialasporites	C. dampieri	El Zampa Section	Upper	A pollen	A callialasporites	
Callialasporites	C. trilobatus	El Zampa Section	Upper	A pollen	A callialasporites	
Classopollis	C. martinotti	El Zampa Section	Upper	A pollen	A cheirolepidiaceae	
Cyclusphaera	C. psilata	El Zampa Section	Upper	A pollen	An araucariaceae	
Cycadopites	C. nitidus	El Zampa Section	Upper	A pollen	A cycadophyte	
Equisetosporites	E. evidens	El Zampa Section	Upper	A pollen	A cycadophyte	
Equisetosporites	E. irregularis	El Zampa Section	Upper	A pollen	A cycadophyte	
Equisetosporites	E. ovatus	El Zampa Section	Upper	A pollen	A cycadophyte	
Microcachryidites	M. antarcticus	El Zampa Section	Upper	A pollen	A podocarpaceae	
Singhia	S. multicostata	El Zampa Section	Upper	A pollen	A gymnospermopsida	

=== Ferns ===
Ferns of the Huincul Formation
Taxa	Species	Locality	Stratigraphic unit	Material	Notes	Images
Biretisporites	B. poton	El Zampa Section	Upper	A pollen	A schizaeaceae	
Cicatricosisporites	C. dorogensis	El Zampa Section	Upper	A pollen	A schizaeaceae	
Concavissimisporites	C. punctatus	El Zampa Section	Upper	A pollen	A pteridopsida	
Cyathidites	C. australis	El Zampa Section	Upper	A pollen	A pteridopsida	
Echinatisporis	E. longech	El Zampa Section	Upper	A pollen	A pteridopsida	
Echinatisporis	E. sp	El Zampa Section	Upper	A pollen	A pteridopsida	
Microreticulatisporites	M. lacunosus	El Zampa Section	Upper	A pollen	A pteridophyte	
Microreticulatisporites	"M. sp"	El Zampa Section	Upper	A pollen	A pteridophyte	
Polycingulatisporites	P. circulus	El Zampa Section	Upper	A pollen	A pteridophyte	
Polycingulatisporites	P. cf. reduncus	El Zampa Section	Upper	A pollen	A pteridophyte	
Triporoletes	T. singularis	El Zampa Section	Upper	A pollen	A pteridophyte	
Triporoletes	T. reticula	El Zampa Section	Upper	A pollen	A pteridophyte	

=== Other Plants ===
Other plants of the Huincul Formation
Taxa	Species	Locality	Stratigraphic unit	Material	Notes	Images
Balmeiopsis	B. limbatus	El Zampa Section	Upper	A pollen	A pollen morphotaxon of uncertain affinities	
Elateroplicites	E. africaensis	El Zampa Section	Upper	A pollen	A pollen morphotaxon of uncertain affinities	
Leptolepidites	L. proxigranulatus	El Zampa Section	Upper	A pollen	A lycopsid	

== See also ==
- List of fossil sites
- List of dinosaur bearing rock formations
