= Lisandro Formation =

Geological formation in Argentina

- Stratigraphic range: Middle-Late Turonian; ~93.4–90.5 Ma
- Type: Geological formation
- Unit of: Neuquén Group; Río Limay Subgroup
- Underlies: Río Neuquén Subgroup; Portezuelo Formation
- Overlies: Huincul Formation
- Thickness: 35–75 m (115–246 ft)

Lithology
- Primary: Siltstone, claystone
- Other: Mudstone, sandstone

Location
- Coordinates: 34.1°S 68.9°W
- Approximate paleocoordinates: 40.1°S 64.8°W
- Region: Mendoza, Río Negro & Neuquén Provinces
- Country: Argentina
- Extent: Neuquén Basin

Type section
- Named for: Cerro Lisandro
- Named by: Herrero Ducloux
- Year defined: 1938
- Lisandro Formation (Argentina)

The Lisandro Formation, alternatively known as the Cerro Lisandro Formation, is a Late Cretaceous (Late Cenomanian to Early Turonian) geologic formation with outcrops in the Neuquén, Río Negro and Mendoza Provinces of Argentina. It is the youngest formation within the Río Limay Subgroup, the lowest section of the Neuquén Group. Formerly that subgroup was treated as a formation, and the Lisandro Formation was known as the (Cerro) Lisandro Member.

The type locality of the Lisandro Formation is the hill known as Cerro Lisandro in Neuquén Province. This formation conformably overlies the Huincul Formation, and it is in turn overlain by the Portezuelo Formation, which is a part of the Río Neuquén Subgroup.

The Lisandro Formation varies between 35 and 75 metres (115 and 246 ft) thick, the thinnest of the three formations in its subgroup. It is composed of siltstones and claystones, red in color, which have been interpreted as a swampy to fluvial environment. Usually, the red Lisando Formation rocks are easy to distinguish from the greenish or yellowish deposits of the Huincul Formation.

== Fossil content ==
Not many dinosaurs are represented in the Lisandro Formation; other types of animals are frequently found. Fossils documented from this formation are:

- freshwater bivalve molluscs
- fish (Ceratodus and Chaoceratodus)
- turtles
- a carcharodontosaurid theropod
- crocodilians
- an abelisauroid theropod
- "Bayosaurus pubica"
- at least one bird
- ornithopods (including Anabisetia)
- a peirosaurid Bayomesasuchus hernandezi
- a titanosaur sauropod Quetecsaurus rusconii

== See also ==
- List of fossil sites
- Bajo Barreal Formation, contemporaneous formation of the Golfo San Jorge Basin
- Mata Amarilla Formation, contemporaneous formation of the Austral Basin
- List of dinosaur bearing rock formations
