= Lohan Cura Formation =

Geologic formation in Argentina

- Stratigraphic range: Late Aptian-Albian; ~117–111.4 Ma
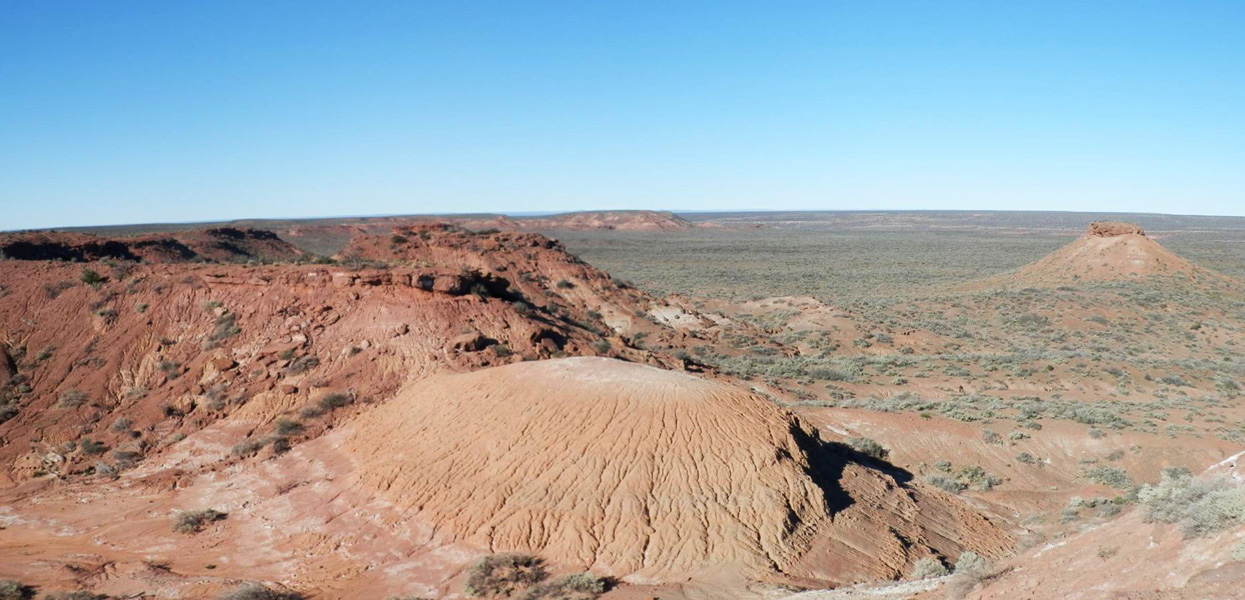
- Type: Geological formation
- Sub-units: Puesto Quiroga & Cullín Grande Members
- Underlies: Río Limay Subgroup; Candeleros Formation
- Overlies: Mendoza Group; La Amarga, Agrio & Bajada Colorada Formations
- Thickness: 177 m (581 ft)

Lithology
- Primary: Mudstone, siltstone, sandstone
- Other: Claystone

Location
- Coordinates: 39.6°S 69.4°W
- Approximate paleocoordinates: 43.7°S 39.4°W
- Region: Río Negro Province, Mendoza Province, Neuquén Province
- Country: Argentina
- Extent: Neuquén Basin

Type section
- Named by: Leanza & Hugo
- Year defined: 1995
- Lohan Cura Formation (Argentina)

The Lohan Cura Formation is a geologic formation with outcrops in the Argentine provinces of Río Negro, Neuquén, and Mendoza. It is the second oldest Cretaceous terrestrial formation in the Neuquén Basin.

The Lohan Cura Formation unconformably overlies the terrestrial La Amarga Formation. In some places it also overlies the older marine Agrio and Bajada Colorada Formations of the Mendoza Group through the same Middle Miranican unconformity. It is in turn overlain by the Candeleros Formation of the Neuquén Group, separated by the Main Miranican unconformity. The Lohan Cura correlates with the Rayoso Formation in some areas.

== Subdivision ==
The Lohan Cura Formation contains two members of roughly equal thickness. The lowermost member, Puesto Quiroga Member is approximately 85 metres (279 ft) thick. The lowest sediments in this unit are conglomerates, overlain by sandstones and siltstones. The upper two-thirds of the member consists mainly of shales. The Cullín Grande Member is the upper member within the formation, about 92 metres (302 ft) thick, which contains numerous sandstones displaying evidence of stream channels. Near the top of the sequence, siltstones and claystones become dominant.

== Fossil content ==
Dinosaurs of the Lohan Cura Formation
Genus	Species	Presence	Notes	Images
Agustinia	A. ligabuei	Neuquén Province	Dorsal sacral and caudal neural arches, hindlimb elements, and pelvic fragments (the latter misidentified as osteoderms)	
Comahuesaurus	C. windhauseni	Neuquén Province	"At least three individuals"	
Ligabuesaurus	L. leanzai	Neuquén Province	Partial skull and postcranial remains	
Limaysaurus	L. sp.	Neuquén Province	Single tooth and postcranial materials, at least from 3 individuals	

Pterosaurs of the Lohan Cura Formation
Genus	Species	Presence	Notes	Images
Ornithocheiriformes	Indeterminate	Neuquén Province	"Isolated teeth"	

== See also ==
- List of dinosaur-bearing rock formations
