= Neuquén Group =

Group of geologic formations in Argentina

- Stratigraphic range: Albian-Campanian; ~111–79 Ma
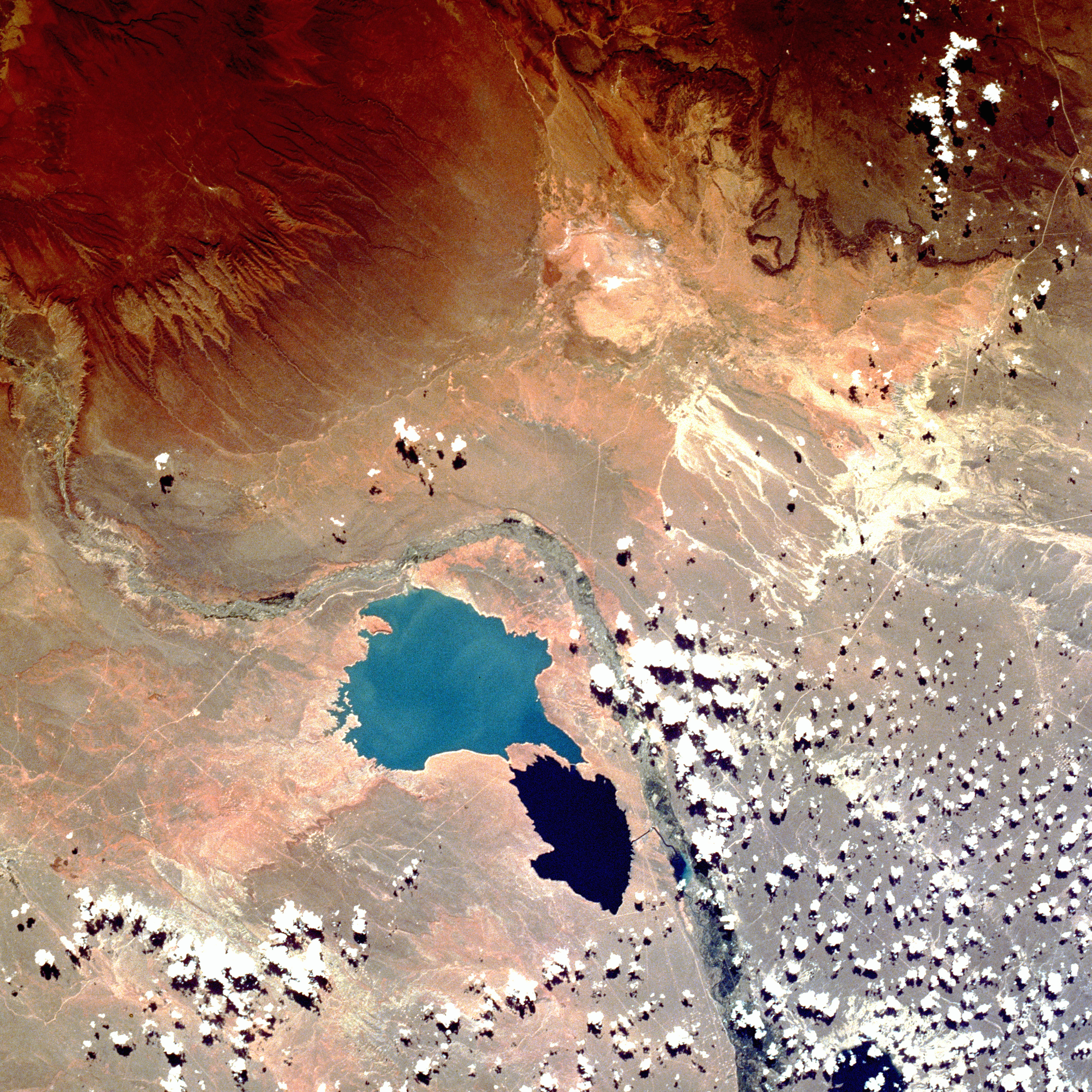
- Almost the whole extent of the Neuquén Group is exposed between Lake Los Barreales and the bend of the Neuquén River in the center of this photo.To the lower left of the lake, a swath of light yellowish sandstones of the group's Huincul Formation are visible.
- Type: Group
- Sub-units: Río Colorado Subgroup; Anacleto Formation; Bajo de la Carpa Formation Río Neuquén Subgroup; Plottier Formation; Portezuelo Formation Río Limay Subgroup; Lisandro Formation; Huincul Formation; Candeleros Formation
- Underlies: Malargüe Group; Allen Formation
- Overlies: Lohan Cura Formation
- Thickness: 500 m (1,600 ft)

Location
- Coordinates: 38.5°S 68.7°W
- Approximate paleocoordinates: 44.4°S 47.2°W
- Region: Río Negro, Neuquén & Mendoza Provinces
- Country: Argentina
- Extent: Neuquén Basin

Type section
- Named for: Neuquén
- Neuquén Group (Argentina)

The Neuquén Group is a group of geologic formations found in Argentina. Rocks in the Neuquén Group fall within the Albian to Campanian ages of the Late Cretaceous period. It overlies the older Lohan Cura Formation and is itself overlain by the younger Allen Formation of the Malargüe Group, separated from both by unconformities.

== Description ==
Deposits have been located in the provinces of Río Negro, Neuquén, and Mendoza. Although several different types of environments are represented in various sections of the Neuquén Group, the dominant regime is alluvial deposition. Many dinosaur and other fossil types have been discovered in these sediments.

=== Subdivision ===
There are seven formations within the Neuquén Group. These are divided into three subgroups named after major rivers in the area. In some works, the subgroups themselves are treated as formations and what usually is considered to be the formations as mere members of these. However, particularly in the Río Limay Subgroup, the formations are clearly composed of very distinct rock layers.

Neuquén Group strata, ordered from youngest to oldest

- Río Colorado Subgroup (Santonian to Campanian)
  - Anacleto Formation (Campanian)
  - Bajo de la Carpa Formation (Santonian)
- Río Neuquén Subgroup (late Turonian to Coniacian)
  - Plottier Formation (late Coniacian ?to early Santonian)
  - Sierra Barrosa Formation (middle Coniacian)
  - Los Bastos Formation (early Coniacian)
  - Portezuelo Formation (late Turonian to earliest Coniacian)
  - Cerro Lisandro Formation (middle Turonian)
- Río Limay Subgroup (Albian)
  - Lisandro Formation (Albian)
  - Huincul Formation (Albian)
  - Candeleros Formation (Albian)

South of Añelo, on the road between Lake Los Barreales and the Neuquén River are views on the successively younger formations, starting with the Lisandro Formation to the northwest of Lake Los Barreales, and finally crossing the Anacleto Formation about 35 kilometres (22 mi) down the road near the eastern tip of the lake. The older strata are exposed south of Lake Los Barreales.

== See also ==
- List of fossil sites
- Angostura Colorada Formation, Campanian to Maastrichtian fossiliferous formation of the North Patagonian Massif
- Asencio Formation, Campanian to Maastrichtian fossiliferous formation of the Paraná Basin
- Bajo Barreal Formation, Cenomanian to Turonian fossiliferous formation of the Golfo San Jorge Basin
- Bauru Group, Coniacian to Maastrichtian fossiliferous group of the Paraná Basin
- Cerro Fortaleza Formation, Cenomanian fossiliferous formation of the Austral Basin
- Colorado Formation, Campanian to Maastrichtian fossiliferous formation of the Colorado Basin
- Lago Colhué Huapí Formation, Campanian to Maastrichtian fossiliferous formation of the Golfo San Jorge Basin
- Los Blanquitos Formation, Campanian fossiliferous formation of the Salta Basin
- Mata Amarilla Formation, Albian to Santonian fossiliferous formation of the Austral Basin
- Santa Marta Formation, Santonian to Campanian fossiliferous formation of northern Antarctica
