= Río Limay Subgroup =

Geological unit in Argentina

- Stratigraphic range: Early Cenomanian-Early Turonian; ~98–91 Ma
- Type: Geological formation
- Unit of: Neuquén Group
- Sub-units: Candeleros, Huincul & Lisandro Formations
- Underlies: Río Neuquén Subgroup
- Overlies: Lohan Cura Formation
- Thickness: Up to 625 m (2,051 ft)

Lithology
- Primary: Sandstone
- Other: Siltstone, claystone

Location
- Coordinates: 39.4°S 69.2°W
- Approximate paleocoordinates: 46.5°S 45.5°W
- Region: Mendoza, Neuquén & Río Negro Provinces
- Country: Argentina
- Extent: Neuquén Basin

Type section
- Named for: Limay River
- Río Limay Subgroup (Argentina)

The Río Limay Subgroup is a geological unit of the Neuquén Group in the Neuquén Basin of Neuquén, Mendoza and Río Negro Provinces, northern Patagonia, Argentina. The strata date back to the Late Cretaceous (Early Cenomanian to Early Turonian. The Río Limay Subgroup overlies the Lohan Cura Formation, separated by an unconformity dated to 98 Ma. Dinosaur remains are among the fossils that have been recovered from the formations it contains.

Having previously been considered a distinct formation, the Río Limay Subgroup is now considered a member of the larger Neuquén Group, and itself contains several specific geological formations (from youngest to oldest):

- Lisandro Formation (late Cenomanian to early Turonian)
- Huincul Formation (late Cenomanian)
- Candeleros Formation (early Cenomanian)

== See also ==
- List of dinosaur-bearing rock formations
