= Villa El Chocón =

- Municipality and village
- Location within Neuquén Province Location within Argentina
- Coordinates: 39°14′S 68°45′W
- Country: Argentina
- Province: Neuquén Province
- Time zone: UTC−3 (ART)
- Climate: BWk

Villa El Chocón Cerros Colorados is a village and municipality in Neuquén Province in southwestern Argentina.

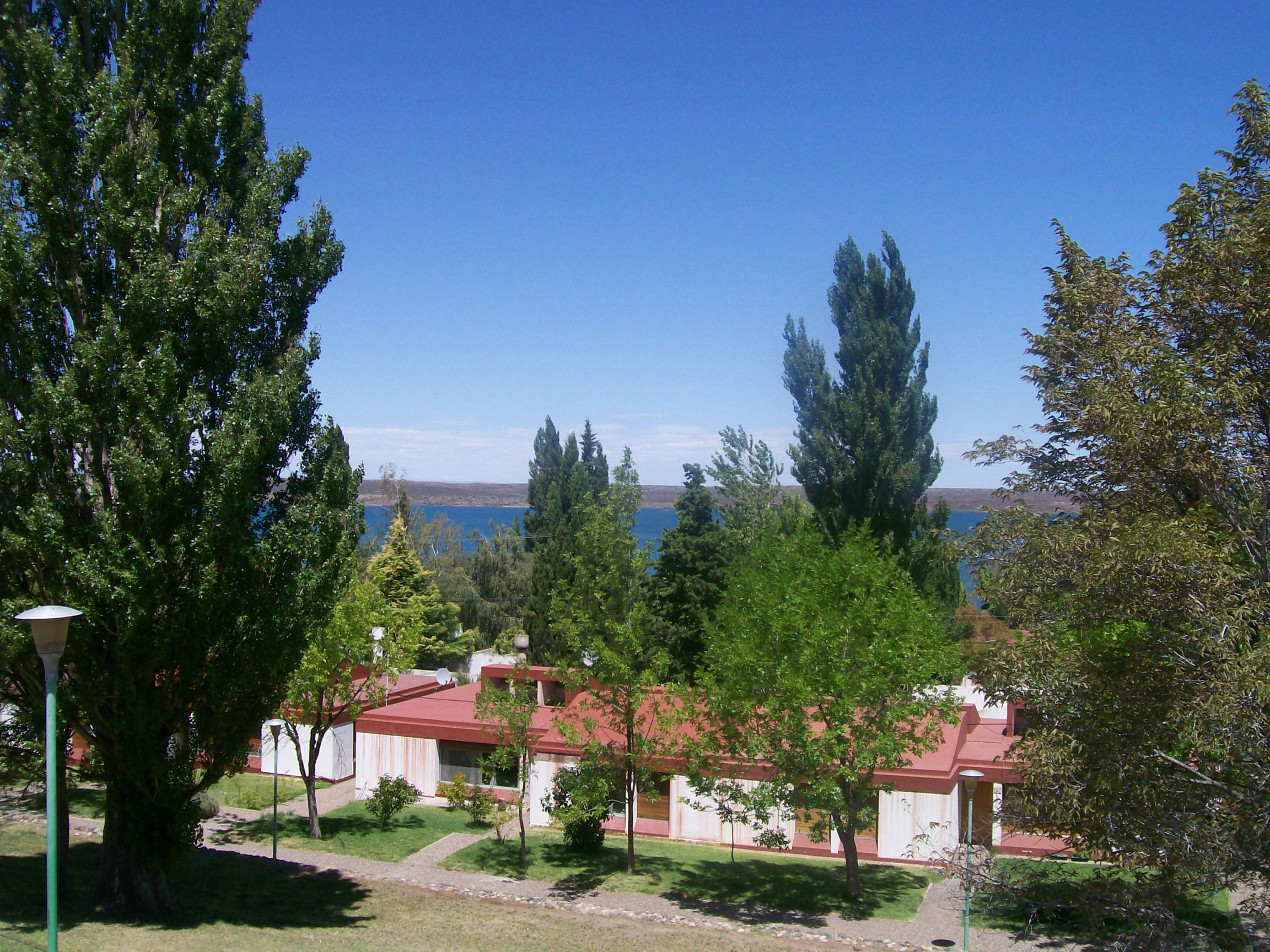
Villa El Chocón

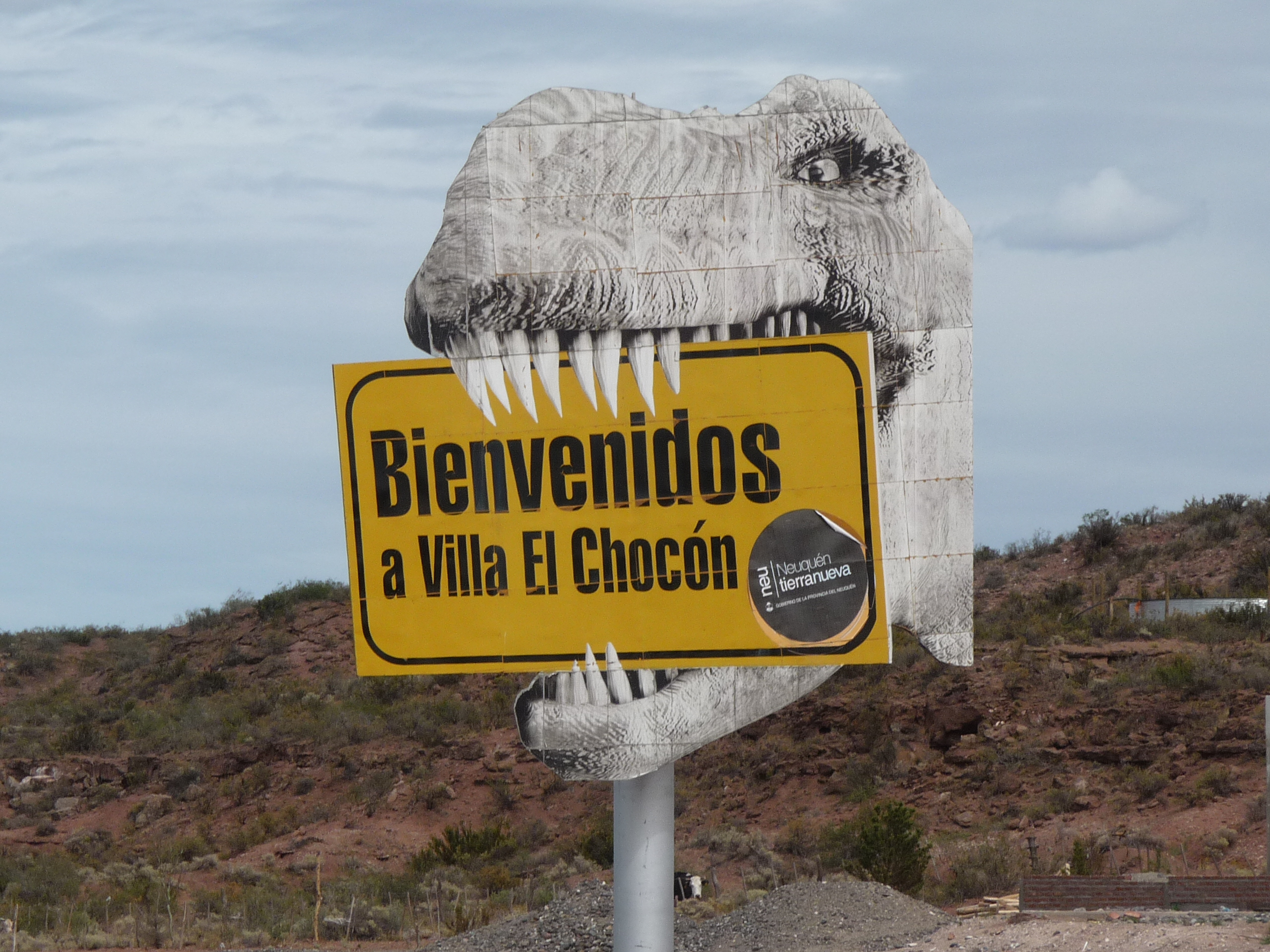
Sign at the entrance of Villa el Chocón

The village was initially created to house the workmen building the Ezequiel Ramos Mexía dam (colloquially known as El Chocón Dam) on the Limay River. The dam is now completed and is the site of one of the main hydroelectric power plants in Argentina.

Located in Villa El Chocón Cerros Colorados is the Ernesto Bachmann Paleontological Museum, which exhibits several fossil remains found nearby, notably those of Giganotosaurus. Also, near Villa El Chocón, were found several groups of fossil dinosaur footprints .

== History ==
In 1967 the national government created the company Hidroeléctrica Norpatagónica S.A. (HIDRONOR S.A.) to develop hydroelectrical facilities in the Limay River and in the Neuquén River.

So, in late 1968, HIDRONOR S.A. begins the works at the Complejo Hidroeléctrico Chocón-Cerros Colorados. The first workshops, accesses, camps and pieces of equipment are then located. Due to its dimensions and installed power, El Chocón would become the touchstone of the country's energy system. Because of this it was then called the work of the century.

The construction of this complex changed the place's physiognomy, which is characterised by a semi-arid and a few sparsely located inhabitants, which mainly bred goats and sheep. Shortly thereafter came the dam, the huge artificial lake, the power plant and the whole village with roads, dwellings and other buildings (the church, a business center, the town hall and a sports center. Afterwards, the village had its first school, whose first principal was María Rosa Miraglia. Quickly many trees were grown and many people went to live in the village. During the 1968–1972 period, Villa El Chocón had a large migratory influx that allowed it to have more than 5,000 inhabitants, by incorporating workers from other Argentine provinces and from other countries.

In December 1972 the first turbine of El Chocón power plant started operating and works ended in 1977 with the installation of the sixth generator. Once the complex was finished, there was a notorious reduction in the number of inhabitants due to the lack of other economic alternatives in the village.

During the 1990s began a series of reformations that finished with the structural transformation of the system of public services in Argentina, which included the privatisation of HIDRONOR S.A. in 1993.

Originally created as an additional piece of the undertaking, Villa El Chocón passed to provincial jurisdiction upon the granting of the hydroelectrical complex. So, the Municipality of El Chocón assumes the custody of most dwellings and many functions, such as infrastructure and cleansing services upkeep. In addition, other agents, such as private and public companies join in as service providers.

== Population ==
The village has 1,174 inhabitants, which represents a 5.37% increase versus the 957 inhabitants of the previous census. The population is made up of 579 men and 595 women, which is a 97.31% masculinity index. On the other hand, dwellings increased from 291 to 498.

== Neighbourhoods ==
Villa El Chocón is made up of five neighbourhoods: I, II, III, Piedras Coloradas, and Barrio Llequén at the outskirts of the village. Neighbourhoods I, II and III were chiefly created for power plant workers and police officers and dwellings were given in hierarchical order. Hence, in Neighbourhood I lived those inhabitants with the most important ranks, and so on.

These neighbourhoods take advantage of the hills upon which the village is located, with Neighbourhood III being in the highest place and Neighbourhood I in the lowest position.

Houses are very much alike: they are rectangular with white walls and red tiled rooftops. Their backyards are well outlined and the dwellings are located very close to one another. The streets are narrow and paved. The Piedras Coloradas neighbourhood, also known as "140 Lotes", is located in the zone among the Police Department, the Town Hospital and Neighborhood I. and it is the newest in terms of both people settlement and construction.

The village has a Town Hall, an office of Tourism, the Ernesto Bachmann Museum, a Paleonthology Workshop and formal education school; a primary school and a secondary school, a church, a bank, a local library, shops, offices of the Social Security Institute of Neuquén (Instituto de Seguridad Social del Neuquén, I. S. S. N.), a post office, Justice of the Peace, toilets, a bus stop, a Fire Department, a police station, a hospital, a delegation of Argentine National Gendarmerie, forest ranger delegations, a delegation of Argentine Naval Prefecture, a municipal gymnasium, courts of basketball, tennis and bowls, football pitches, a swimming pool, camping areas, green areas, a beach with white sand, a multi-purpose room, an amphitheatre, hostels, cottages for rent, a restaurant, a municipal inn, overlooks, dinosaur footprints a YPF service station, offices of E. P. A. S. and E. P. E. N., a radio station ( FM 106.1), and the hydroelectric dam.

The Iglesia Espíritu Santo (Church of the Holy Spirit) has got an interesting shape: in the inside it is shaped as Noah's Ark and contains the flags of the countries from where the people who built the dam came. In the outside, the roof grabs visitors' attention because of its slanting shape, resembling a half-pot. It is dark green and represents the dam.

Between Neighbourhood II and Neighbourhood III two schools are located, primary school 26 and C. P. E. M. 9. These schools are attended by all children and teenagers of the town. Across the street is a square with a playground.

Touristic attractions in the village are the museum, the hydroelectric dam, many overlooks, the trail of Cañadón Escondido, the dinosaur footprints, The Giants, the reservoir and the pier.

== Palaeontological findings ==
The Ernesto Bachmann Paleontological Museum was created since the discovery of the remains of Giganotosaurus carolinii, one of the world's largest carnivorous dinosaurs, found in July 1993 by Rubén Darío Carolini, 18 kilometres (roughly 11.2 miles) to the southwest of Villa El Chocón. The best preserved remains of a specimen of this species are shown at the Museum. Estimations indicate that "Giganotosaurus" reached 12 to 13 meters long, the skull was as much as 1.56 meters, and weighted between 6 and eight tons. The museum opened on the 10th of July in the year 1997 and since the 16th of March in the year 1999 it bears the name Ernesto Bachmann, an amateur paleontologist like Carolini. Fossil remains of other prehistoric marine and terrestrial reptiles, both found at the site and donated, replicas of bones, fossilised worm trails, the car used and created by Carolini, rocks, et cetera.

== The El Chocón hydroelectric dam ==
The Exequiel Ramos Mexía dam, built on the Limay river, is 262.4 metres deep and 315. square miles wide. It is the largest dam in Argentina and it was built out of loose materials. Construction was begun in 1967 by Hidroeléctrica Norptagónica S. A. (HIDRONOR), and the dam is operating since 1972. This dam releases a maximum flow of 8,300 cubic metres per second. Currently, only 8 people dwelling in the town work there, with the remaining workers coming from other cities.

People in Villa El Chocón mostly work at the Town Hall, Gendarmerie, the Museum and/or as police officers. Some residents own shops at the centre and others go weekly to Neuquén to work.

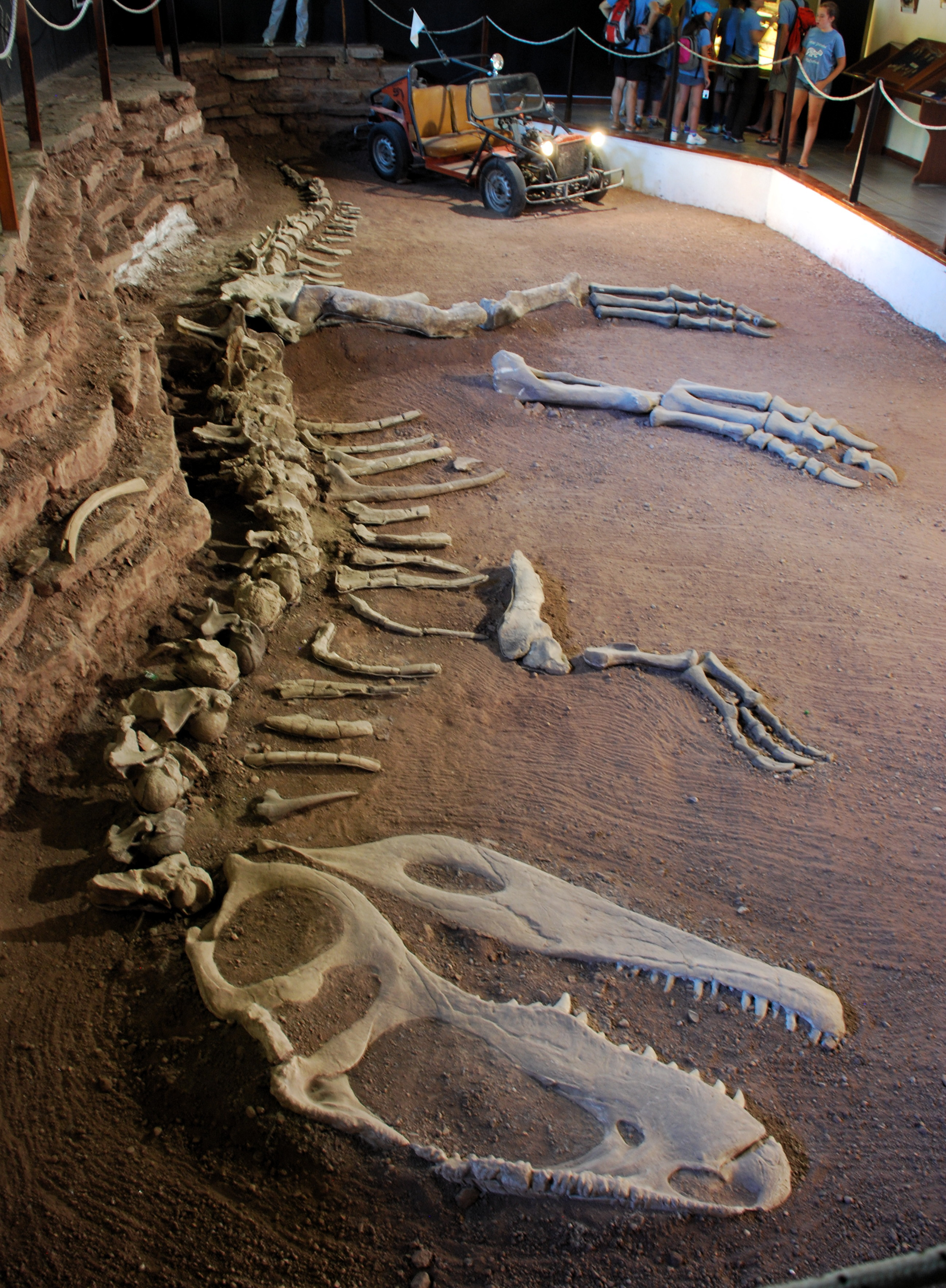
Giganotosaurus carolinii at the Ernesto Bachmann Paleontological Museum

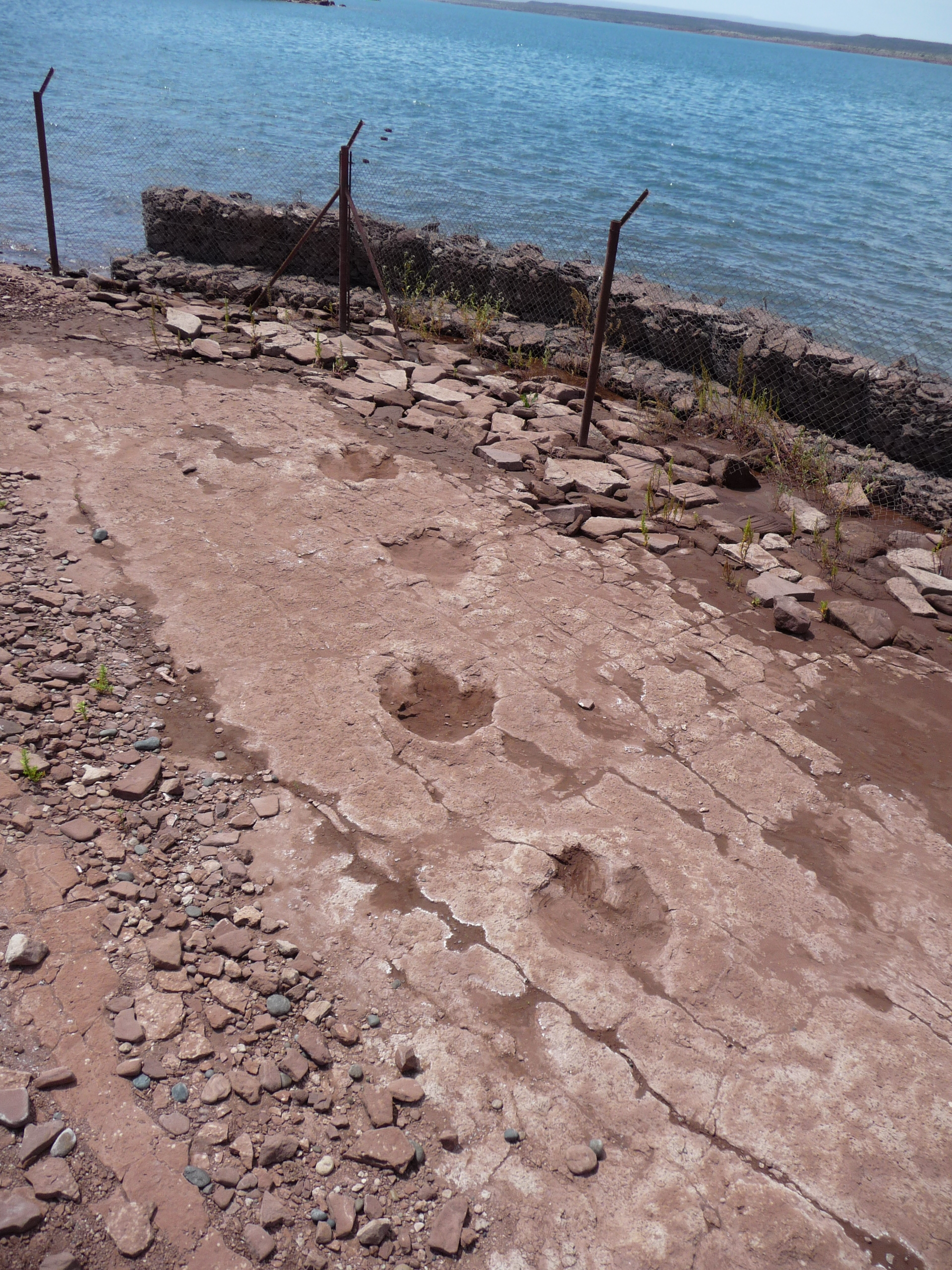
Fossil footprints near Villa El Chocón
