= Continental intercalaire =

- Stratigraphic range: Albian–Cenomanian
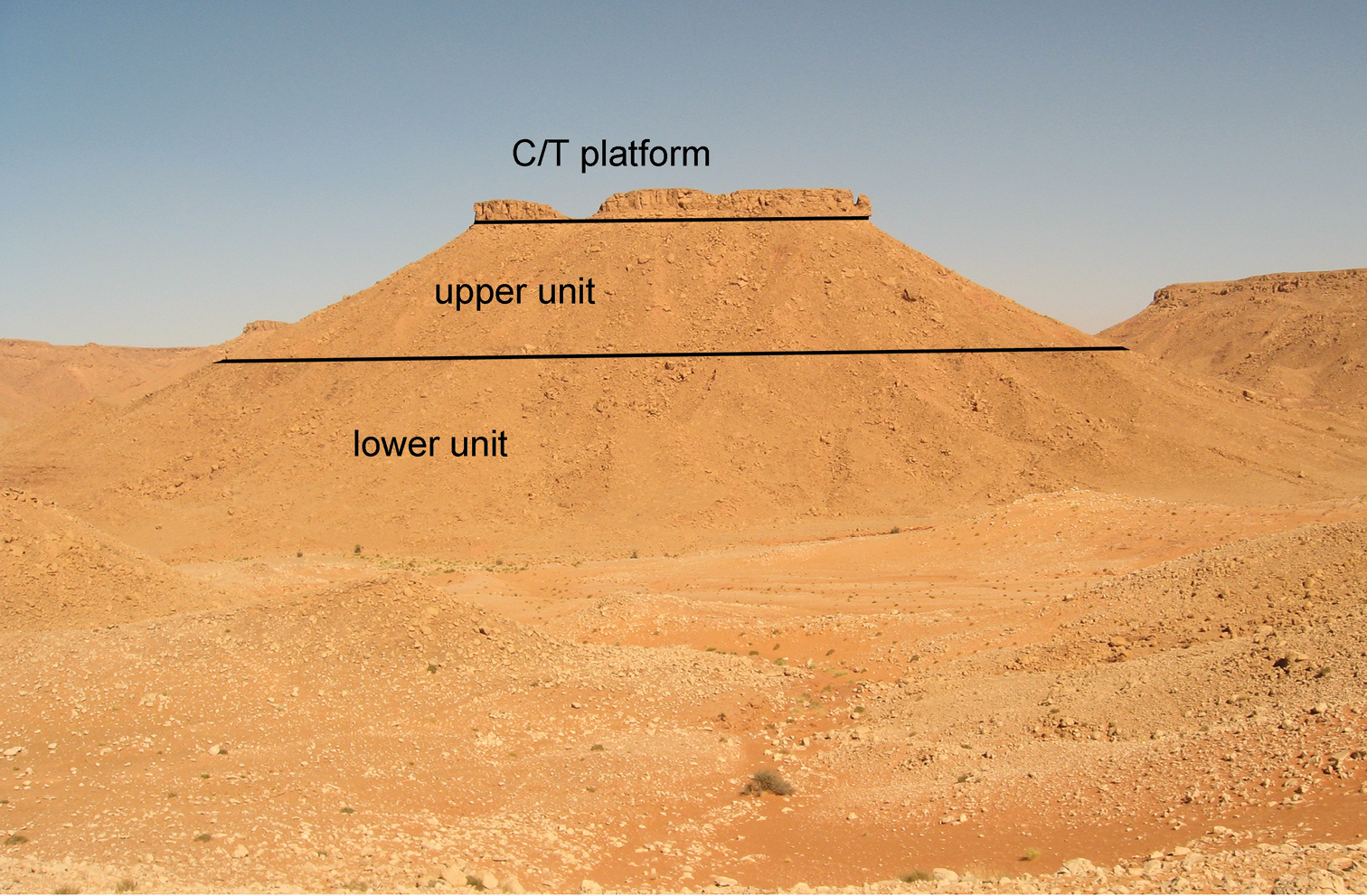
- Outcrops of the "Continental intercalaire infracenomanien" in the Kem Kem
- Type: Geological formation
- Overlies: Paleozoic rocks (often Carboniferous in age)
- Thickness: 30 to 800 metres (100 to 2,600 ft)

Lithology
- Primary: Sandstone, claystone, conglomerate

Location
- Region: Northern Africa

The Continental intercalaire, sometimes referred to as the Continental intercalaire Formation, is a term applied to Cretaceous strata in Northern Africa. It is the largest single stratum found in Africa to date, being between 30 and 800 metres (100 and 2,600 ft) thick in some places. Fossils, including dinosaurs, have been recovered from this formation. The Continental intercalaire stretches from Algeria, Tunisia and Niger in the west to Egypt and Sudan in the east.

== History ==
Fernand Foureau was the first to excavate fossils from the Continental intercalaire in Djoua, Algeria in 1893, and Léon Pervinquière studied the Continental intercalaire in Tataouine, Tunisia in 1912.

The Continental intercalaire was later identified during the course of several expeditions to the Sahara from 1946 to 1959 which were led by the French paleontologist Albert-Félix de Lapparent.

== Description ==
The Continental intercalaire is most often likened to the Kem Kem Group in Morocco. It likely represents fluviatile facies, suggesting an environment with many rivers and streams.

== Fossil content ==
Color key: Taxon / Reclassified taxon / Taxon falsely reported as present / Dubious taxon or junior synonym / Ichnotaxon / Ootaxon / Morphotaxon	Notes; Uncertain or tentative taxa are in small text; ~~crossed out~~ taxa are discredited.

=== Archosaurs ===
==== Dinosaurs ====
Dinosaurs of the Continental intercalaire
Genus	Species	Location	Material	Notes	Images
Aegyptosaurus	A. baharijensis	Egypt; Iguallala, Niger	Vertebrae, thoracic rib fragment, and two metatarsals (Niger); caudal vertebrae (Egypt)		
Bahariasaurus	B.ingens	Niger	Six vertebrae		
"Brachiosaurus"	"B" nougaredi	Taouratine, Algeria	Partial sacrum and left forelimb	Previously believed to be discovered from the Late Jurassic-age Taouratine Series. Likely does not belong as a species of Brachiosaurus and may represent multiple sauropod species.	
Carcharodontosaurus	C. saharicus	Timimoun, Algeria; El Rhaz, Niger; In Abangarit, Niger; Guermessa, Tunisia	164 teeth, several vertebrae, partial humerus, and a metatarsal	Collection of multiple specimens with teeth found at all four localities.	
Carcharodontosaurus	cf.C.sp		Fragmentary remains	Collection of multiple specimens with teeth found at all four localities.	
Coelurosauria	Coelurosauria indet.	Morocco	Left tibia and a "large" femur	Similar to cf. Elaphrosaurus from Egypt.	
Coelurosauria	Coelurosauria indet.	In Abangarit, Niger; In Tedreft, Niger	16 vertebrae, left humerus, right ulna, left pubis, femur, right tibia (In Abangarit material); 3 damaged vertebrae, sacrum, 3 hand claws, right tibia, isolated tibia, metatarsal, 4 phalanges (In Tedreft material)	Previously known as Elaphrosaurus gautieri and is a collection of multiple specimens.	
Coelurosauria	Coelurosauria indet.	Ebrechko, Niger; El Rhaz, Niger; Ifayen Ignère, Niger; In Abangarit, Niger	49 teeth, 8 caudal vertebrae, a hand claw, a damaged right femur, and a tibia	Previously known as Elaphrosaurus iguidensis and is a collection of multiple specimens.	
Dinosauria	Dinosauria indet.	Djoua, Algeria	Fragments	Discovered by Fernand Foureau in 1893.	
Dinosauria	Dinosauria indet.	Tilemsi, Mali	"Large bones"	Only ever mentioned in passing.	
Iguanodontia	Iguanodontia indet.	Kanboute, Tunisia	Upper right maxillary tooth	Previously described as belonging to Iguanodon mantelli. Discovered on 15 January 1951.	
Inosaurus	I. tedreftensis	In Tedreft, Niger	Two dorso-lumbar vertebrae, two smaller vertebrae, two fused sacral vertebrae, five middle or posterior caudal vertebrae, seven caudal vertebra fragments, left proximal tibia.	Includes the holotype specimen.	
Megalosauroidea	Megalosauroidea indet.	Timimoun, Algeria	Two teeth	Discovered by Captain Burté.	
Nigersaurus	N. taqueti				
Paralititan?	P. stromeri?			May instead be Aegyptosaurus	
Rebbachisaurus?	R.? tamesnensis	Aoulef, Algeria; Djoua, Algeria; In Salah, Algeria; Timimoun, Algeria; Ebrechko, Niger; El Rhaz, Niger; Ifayen Ignère, Niger; Iguallala, Niger; In-Gall, Niger; Tébéhic, Niger; Ténéré, Niger; Tiguidi, Niger; Guermessa, Tunisia	Two humeri and two femora, and a second specimen composed of four isolated teeth, a dentary fragment with three teeth, over 100 vertebrae, six chevrons, 12 ribs, 5 scapulae, an ilium, two ischia, and numerous limb elements	May not belong to Rebbachisaurus.	
Ornithopoda	Ornithopoda indet.			Multiple species	
Sauropoda	Sauropoda indet.	In Gall, Niger	Two vertebrae	Previously referred to Astrodon.	
Sauropoda	Sauropoda indet.	Ibelrane, Mali	Vertebra		
Stegosauria	Stegosauria indet.	In Abangarit, Niger	Dermal plate		
Spinosaurus	S. aegyptiacus	Egypt; Morocco	Abundant teeth and postcranial remains	Used to help date the age of the Continental intercalaire; 94% of theropod teeth in the Continental intercalaire belong to Spinosaurus. Relatively rare in Algerian strata.	
Spinosaurus	cf. S. sp	Kénadsa, Algeria; Menaguir, Algeria; Egypt; Morocco; Tunisia	Abundant teeth and postcranial remains	Used to help date the age of the Continental intercalaire; 94% of theropod teeth in the Continental intercalaire belong to Spinosaurus. Relatively rare in Algerian strata.	
Theropoda	Theropoda indet.	Zarzaïtine, Algeria	Two teeth	Previously placed within Teratosaurus. May be referrable to ?Megalosauridae.	
Titanosauria	Titanosauria indet.	Mali		Represents a distinct species current found only in Mali.	

==== Reptiles ====
Reptiles of the Continental intercalaire
Genus	Species	Location	Material	Notes	Images
Reptilia	Reptilia indet.	Marandet, Niger	Indeterminate remains		

==== Crocodylomorphs ====
Crocodylomorphs of the Continental intercalaire
Genus	Species	Location	Material	Notes	Images
Sarcosuchus	S. imperator				
Sissokosuchus	S. maliensis		A partial dentary tip, parts of the maxilla, and several cranial elements.	A sebecian notosuchian.	

=== Fish ===
Fish of the Continental intercalaire
Genus	Species	Location	Material	Notes	Images
Hybodontidae	Hybodontidae indet.	Menaguir, Tunisia	Fin spine fragment		
Mawsonia		Algeria; Tunisia		(several species)	Mawsonia gigas
Onchopristis	O. numida (or numidus)	Algeria		Includes specimens previously known as Gigantichthys numidus.	

=== Trace fossils ===
Trace fossils of the Continental intercalaire
Genus	Species	Location	Material	Notes	Images
Ophiomorpha	Ophiomorpha sp.	Menaguir, Tunisia			Ophidiomorpha from the Clagget Formation
Skolithos	Skolithos sp.	Menaguir, Tunisia			
Thalassinoides	Thalassinoides sp.	Menaguir, Tunisia			Thalassinoides from Dorset, England

== See also ==
- List of dinosaur-bearing rock formations
