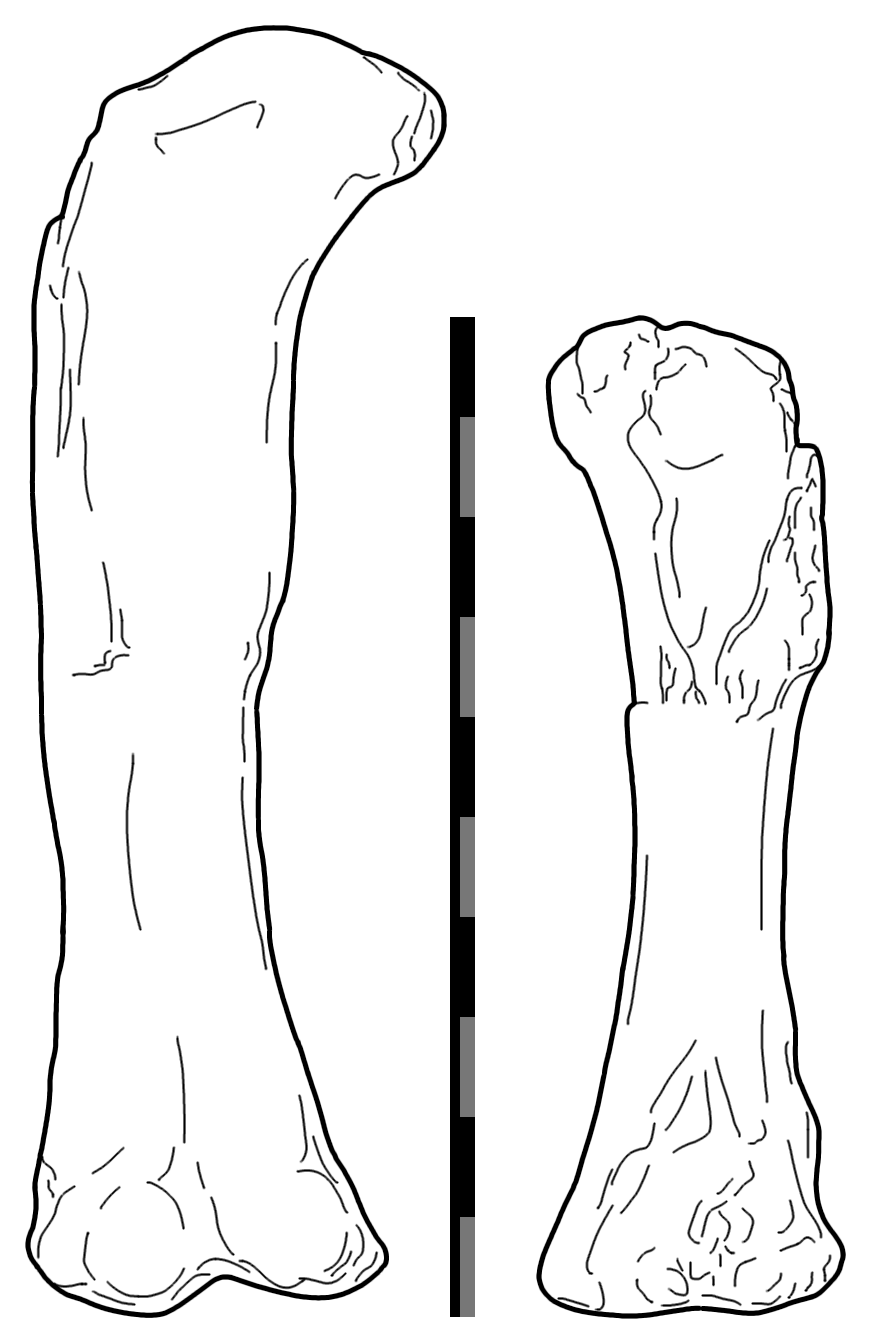
- Humerus and femur reconstructions (from specimen 1912VIII61) to scale

Scientific classification
- Kingdom: Animalia
- Phylum: Chordata
- Class: Reptilia
- Clade: Dinosauria
- Clade: Saurischia
- Clade: †Sauropodomorpha
- Clade: †Sauropoda
- Clade: †Macronaria
- Clade: †Titanosauria
- Genus: †Aegyptosaurus; Stromer, 1932

Type species
- †Aegyptosaurus baharijensis Stromer, 1932

= Aegyptosaurus =

Aegyptosaurus Temporal range: Cenomanian, ~100–94 Ma

Titanosaurid sauropod dinosaur genus from late Cretaceous Period

Aegyptosaurus /iːˌdʒɪptoʊˈsɔːrəs/ (meaning 'Egypt's lizard') is a genus of sauropod dinosaur discovered in Egypt, that lived in what is now Africa, around 95 million years ago, during the Late Cretaceous Period (Cenomanian faunal stage).

== Discovery and naming ==
The holotype (1912VIII61) consists of three caudal vertebrae, a partial scapula, and some limb bones, all of which were discovered in the Bahariya Formation of Egypt between 1910 and c. 1913 by Ernst Stromer and Richard Markgraf and the holotype was sent to Munich, Germany in 1915 to be studied at the same time the holotype of Spinosaurus aegyptiacus was described.

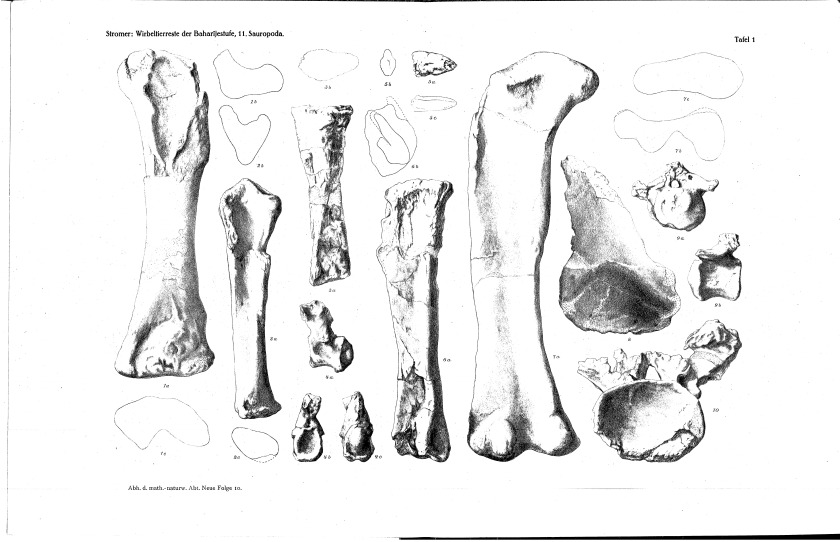
Specimen 1912VIII61, the holotype of A. baharijensis

Aegyptosaurus was described by German paleontologist Ernst Stromer in 1932, seventeen years after the holotype was sent to Munich, and its fossils have been found in the Bahariya Formation of Egypt, the Farak Formation of Niger and in several other different locations in the Sahara Desert. The generic name, Aegyptosaurus, is derived from 'Aegyptos', meaning Egypt, in which it was discovered, and sauros meaning 'lizard' in Greek. All of the specimens destroyed in 1944 were discovered before 1939 and the fossils were stored together in Munich, but were obliterated when an Allied bombing raid destroyed the museum where they were kept on 25 April 1944, during World War II. Only fragments from other specimens still exist, mostly in the form of indeterminate specimens from Egypt and Niger.

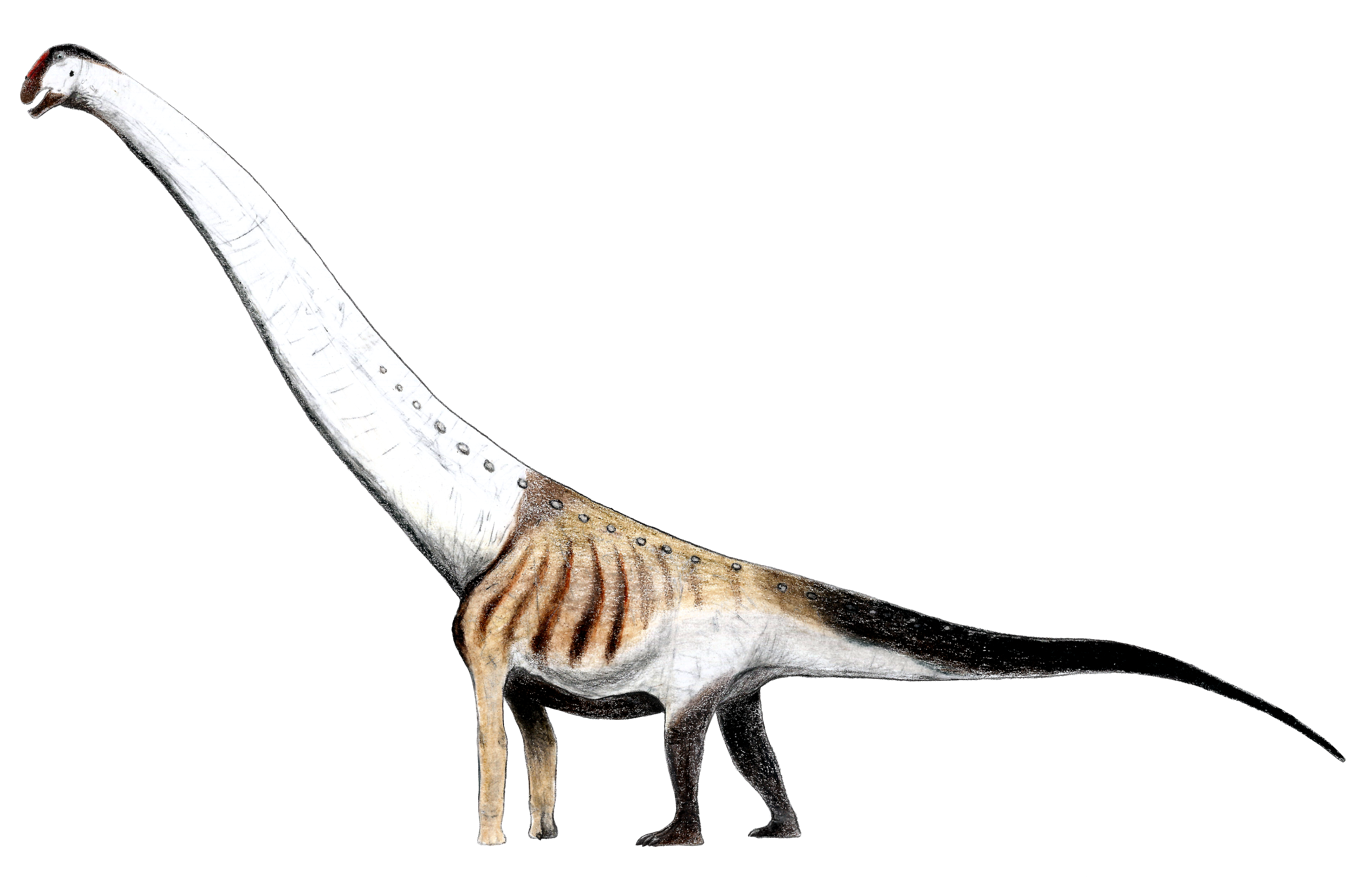
Speculative restoration

de Lapparent (1960) referred a series of caudal vertebrae from the Continental intercalaire of Egypt and vertebrae, a thoracic rib fragment, and two metatarsals from Iguallala, Niger to Aegyptosaurus baharijensis.

== Description ==
In 2010, based on Paralititan and other related titanosaurs, Gregory S. Paul estimated the length of Aegyptosaurus at 15 metres (49 ft), and its weight at 7 tonnes (7.7 short tons).

== Palaeoenvironment ==
North Africa, during the Cenomanian stage of the Late Cretaceous, bordered the Tethys Sea, which transformed the region into a mangrove-dominated coastal environment filled with vast tidal flats and waterways. Aegyptosaurus is known from the Bahariya Formation, then a wetland environment, alongside the theropods such as the enigmatic Bahariasaurus, carcharodontosaurid Tameryraptor, and spinosaurid Spinosaurus, the latter being also known from the Kem Kem beds. Contemporary abelisaurid dinosaurs from the Bahariya Formation were also terrestrial carnivores, preying on other terrestrial fauna. The only other definitive sauropod known from the formation is the titanosaur Paralititan, though a possible rebbachisaurid or small titanosaur has been described as well. A diverse fauna of aquatic animals is known from the Bahariya Formation. Underwater life diversity exploded during this period in the mangroves of North Africa, with turtles represented by the pleurodian Apertotemporalis, large bony fish like Mawsonia and Paranogmius, sawskates Onchopristis and Schizorhiza, sharks like Squalicorax and Cretolamna, and a broad selection of invertebrates.

The composition of the dinosaur fauna of North Africa at this time is an anomaly, as there are fewer herbivorous dinosaur species relative to carnivorous dinosaur species than in most fossil sites. The only herbivorous dinosaurs observed in the Bahariya Formation are Aegyptosaurus, Paralititan, the indeterminate titanosaur/rebbachisaurid, and possibly Bahariasaurus/Deltadromeus, whereas many more carnivorous dinosaurs have been discovered. This abundance of theropods compared to that of non-theropods was dubbed "Stromer's Riddle", which, despite suggestions that this is due to ecological, preservation, or other biases, can be supported by the fossil record. This over prevalence of theropods indicates that there could have been niche partitioning between the different theropod clades, with spinosaurids consuming fish while other groups hunted herbivorous dinosaurs. Isotopic evidence supports this as there were greater quantities of sizable, terrestrial animals in the diets of carcharodontosaurids and ceratosaurs from both the Kem Kem Beds and Elrhaz Formation. North Africa was dominated by a triumvirate of Abelisauroidea, Spinosauridae, and Carcharodontosauridae during the mid-Cretaceous, with all of these groups present in the Kem Kem Beds, Echkar, Elrhaz, and Bahariya Formations.
