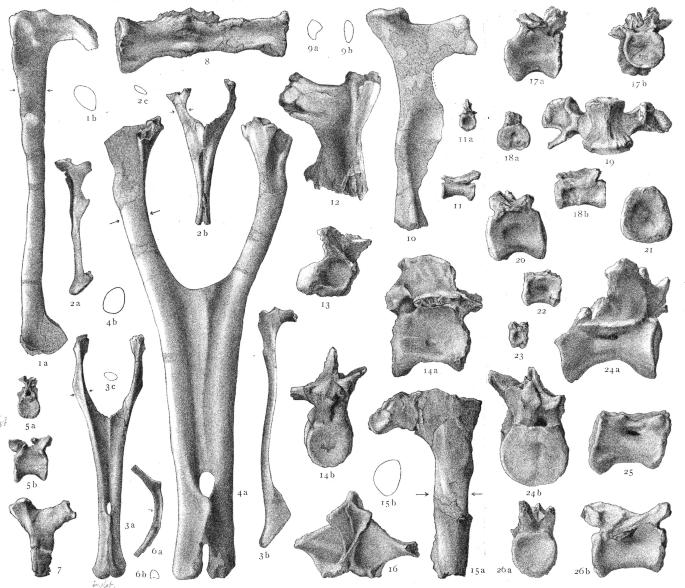
- Plate of fossils assigned to Bahariasaurus, including the holotype (name-bearing) specimen (4, 9-10)

Scientific classification
- Kingdom: Animalia
- Phylum: Chordata
- Class: Reptilia
- Clade: Dinosauria
- Clade: Saurischia
- Clade: Theropoda
- Clade: Averostra
- Genus: †Bahariasaurus; Stromer, 1934
- Species: †B. ingens

Binomial name
- †Bahariasaurus ingens Stromer, 1934

Synonyms
- Deltadromeus? Sereno et al., 1996

= Bahariasaurus =

Bahariasaurus Temporal range: Late Cretaceous (Cenomanian), 95 Ma

Extinct genus of theropod dinosaurs

Bahariasaurus (meaning "Bahariya lizard") is an enigmatic genus of large theropod dinosaur. The genus contains a single species, Bahariasaurus ingens, which was found in North African rock layers dating to the Cenomanian age of the Late Cretaceous. The only fossils confidently assigned to Bahariasaurus were found in the Bahariya Formation of the Bahariya Oasis in Egypt by Ernst Stromer. This material was destroyed during a World War II bombing raid, with the same raid also destroying the holotypes of Spinosaurus, Aegyptosaurus, and other animals found in the Bahariya Formation.

Bahariasaurus is among the largest known theropods, estimated at 11–12 m (36–39 ft) long and around 4 t (3.9 long tons; 4.4 short tons; 8,800 lb) in weight. This approaches the size of other large theropods such as Tyrannosaurus rex and the contemporaneous Carcharodontosaurus. The exact phylogenetic placement of Bahariasaurus has been debated. Some research has proposed close affiinities or even synonymy of Bahariasaurus and the coeval Deltadromeus.

== History and status ==
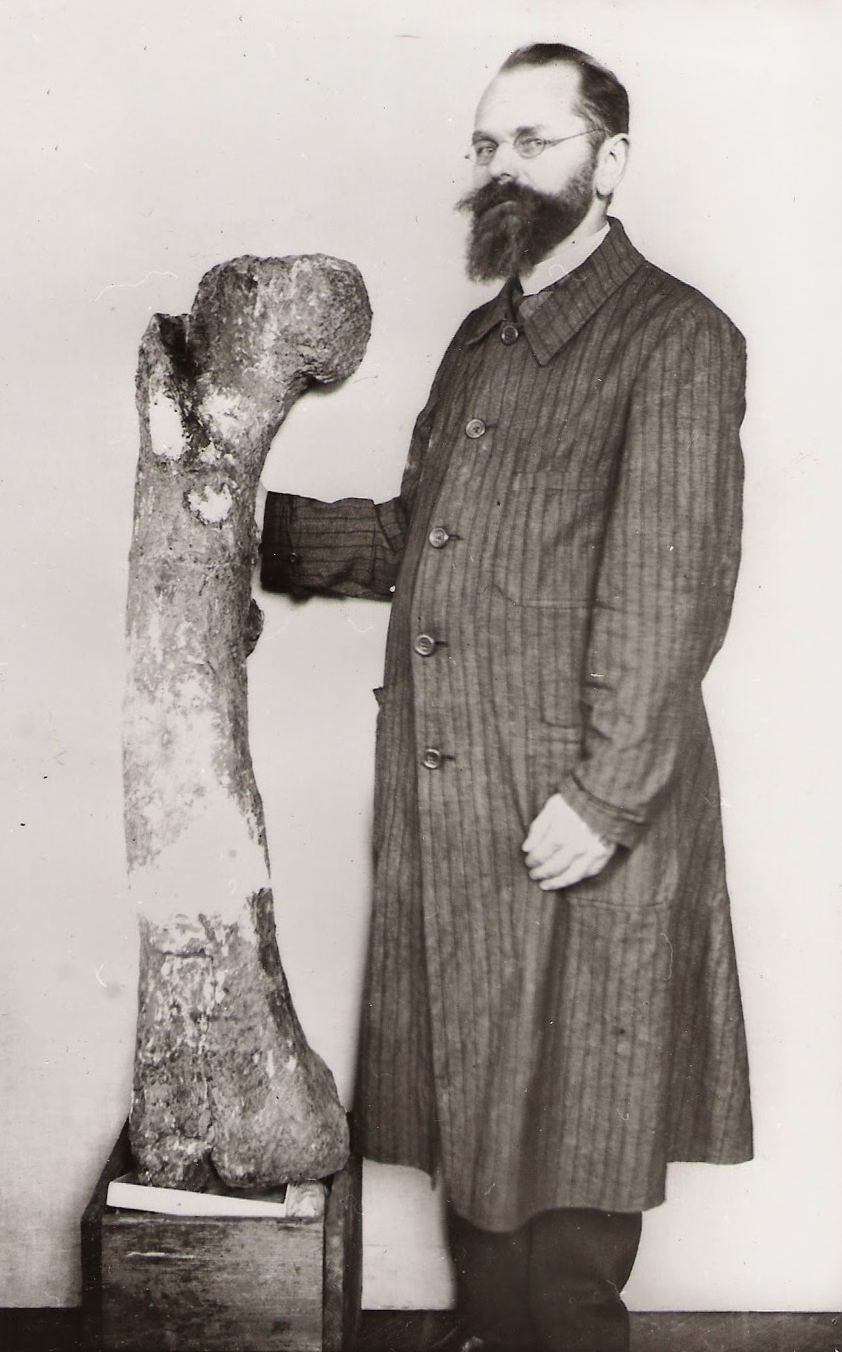
Ernst Stromer in 1914 next to the femur of a Bahariasaurus

In early April 1914, fossils of Bahariasaurus were unearthed from mudstone strata at Gebel Ghorabi near Ain Gedid, Egypt by Austro-Hungarian paleontologist Richard Markgraf. Strata from this region derive from the Cenomanian-aged Bahariya Formation, around 95 million years old, one of many Cretaceous-aged sites of North Africa. In this formation, Markgraf did extensive collecting of dinosaur skeletons for his employer, German paleontologist Ernst Stromer of the Paläontologisches Museum München (Bavarian State Collection of Paleontology). These fossils were then shipped to the Museum München, however due to political tensions between the German Empire and then British-owned Egypt, these specimens took years to get to Germany. It was not until 1922 that they were transported overseas to Munich, where they were described by Stromer in 1934. Among the 1922 discoveries was a large theropod specimen, IPHG 1922 X 47, comprising two dorsal vertebrae, a dorsal neural spine, a dorsal rib fragment, three sacral vertebrae, the pubes, and an incomplete ischium. Motta et al. (2016) stated that the dorsal vertebrae of IPHG 1922 X 47 were actually caudal vertebrae, though few authors have followed this interpretation. Another associated skeleton (IPHG 1922 X 48) was found in 1922, consisting of a cervical vertebra, two dorsal vertebrae, and a pubis.

All of these fossils were described by Stromer in 1934 as belonging to a new genus and species of giant theropod dinosaur, Bahariasaurus ingens, with IPHG 1922 X 47 and IPHG 1922 X 48 specified as type (name-bearing) specimens, making them syntypes. The generic name Bahariasaurus is combines Baharia, in reference to the Bahariya Formation where the fossils were unearthed, with the Latin root sauros, meaning "lizard", while the specific name ingens comes from the Latin word for "huge". In the same work describing Bahariasaurus, Stromer referred a multitude of other large theropod remains to Bahariasaurus, including cervical and dorsal vertebrae, pelvic remains, a scapula, caudal vertebrae, a left and right femur, and a left fibula. An associated specimen containing was tentatively referred as well, containing: a cranial fragment, nine caudal vertebrae, and a scapulocoracoid. However, the scapulacoracoid appears to be from a spinosaurid. This leads to a total of 32 fossils referred to Bahariasaurus known from several different localities, with 18 of them being tentatively referred fossils whereas the syntypes make up the rest. These fossils, due to their differing origins to the syntypes, were noted by Stromer as possibly belonging to one or more species or even genus.

The most notable of these remains was a large, 1.22 m (48 in; 4 ft 0 in) long right femur (IPHG 1912 VIII 69) that Stromer noted as belonging to a theropod comparable in size to Tyrannosaurus. Later authors have defended Stromer's attribution of these referred specimens to Bahariasaurus, with Ijouiher (2022) stating that at least the coracoid, many of the vertebrae, and the pelvis are attributable to Bahariasaurus and distinct from other theropods. World War II broke out in 1939, leading to IPHG 1922 X 47 and other Bahariya material to be destroyed during a British bombing raid on Munich during the night of 24/25 April 1944. Nothing but illustrations of the Bahariasaurus specimens remains.

Remains questionably referred to Bahariasaurus have been found in the Farak Formation (Tegama Group) of Niger, consisting of a proximal caudal centrum (65 mm), two mid caudal centra and three mid caudal centra (from different individuals), were discovered and described by Albert-Félix de Lapparent in 1960. However, the attribution of these fossils to Bahariasaurus is questionable, with some authors stating that they could belong to a carcharodontosaurid whereas Ijouiher (2022) placed it as Theropoda incertae sedis.

== Description ==
Bahariasaurus was a notably large theropod. It may have approached the height and length of other large-bodied theropods such as Tyrannosaurus rex and the contemporaneous Carcharodontosaurus, being estimated as 11–12.2 m (36–40 ft) long and 4–4.6 t (3.9–4.5 long tons; 4.4–5.1 short tons; 8,800–10,100 lb).

Bahariasaurus is only known from postcranial material. The two posterior dorsal vertebral centra are ~157% and 189% longer than they are tall and ~82% and ~95% wider than they are tall. All preserved sacrals have a longitudinally elongate pleurocoel and a ventral median groove, which is unknown in any ceratosaurs. The last sacral vertebrae known from Bahariasaurus implies that there was no greater fusion of the vertebrae after that.

The femur referred to Bahariasaurus and Deltadromeus has a large accessory trochanter, a feature found on many theropods. This femur was noted to differ from that of Deltadromeus in that it appears proportionally stouter, lacks a proximally (towards body) directed femoral head (proximal end of femur), and a shorter lateral accessory crest (extension of bone) on the distal end. The proximal inclination of the femoral head is an adaptation to weight-bearing observed in many dinosaurs, however it is notably absent in this large femur. However, it is present in the smaller femur of the Deltadromeus holotype, suggesting they come from different taxa.

== Classification ==
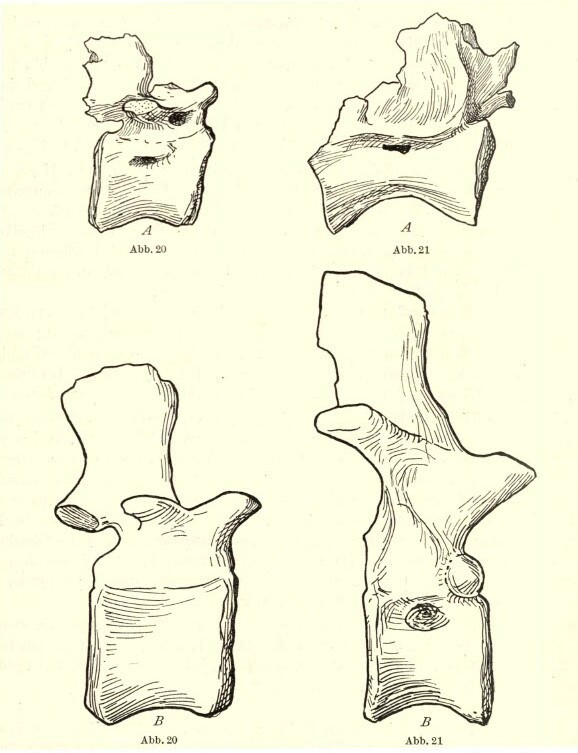
Comparison of a caudal vertebra of Bahariasaurus (top right) to those of Tameryraptor (top left) and Tyrannosaurus (bottom)

Historically, the exact taxonomic placement of Bahariasaurus has been uncertain and debated; it has been variously assigned to several theropod groups, including the Carcharodontosauridae and the superfamily Tyrannosauroidea. In a 1995 paper, German researcher Oliver Rauhut analyzed the systematics of Carcharodontosaurus—though this was based on the material now referred to Tameryraptor—and Bahariasaurus. Rauhut theorized that Carcharodontosaurus and Bahariasaurus were the only two named members of Carcharodontosauridae, but that the family may have originated in Tanzania. This origin hypothesis was based on fossils of "Allosaurus" tendagurensis and "Megalosaurus" ingens, which are two theropods known from fragmentary remains from the Late Jurassic Tendaguru Formation. However, later studies have not supported these conclusions, with Carcharodontosaurus remaining a carcharodontosaurid but is not recovered as a relative of Bahariasaurus, "A." tendagurensis being an indeterminate tetanuran, and "M." ingens possibly being a species of Torvosaurus.

=== Relationship to Deltadromeus ===
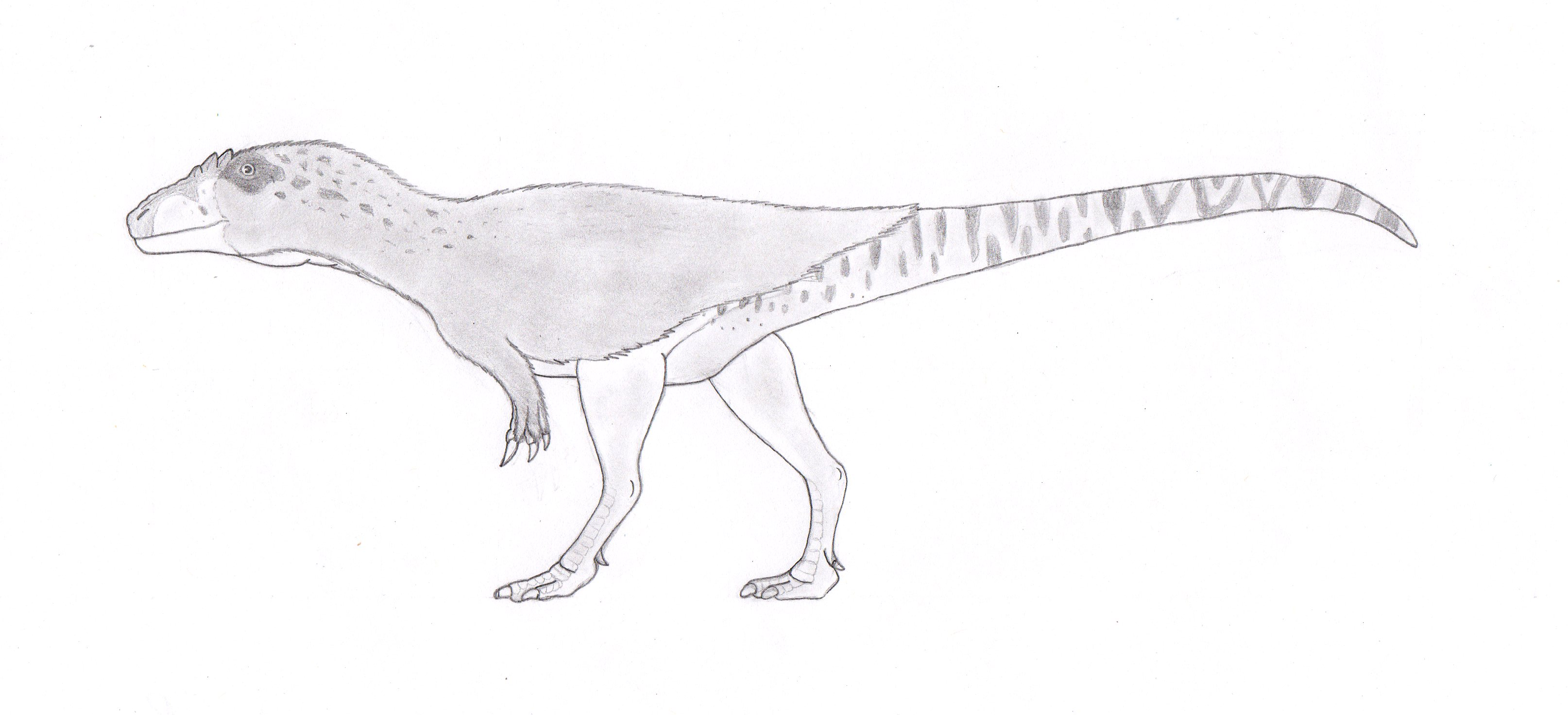
Speculative life restoration of Bahariasaurus as a megaraptoran

During the 1990s, renewed interest in the Cretaceous dinosaur fauna of North Africa resulted in the conduction of many expeditions to fossil formations in Niger, Morocco, and Algeria. In a 1995 during a joint expedition by the University of Chicago and Service Géologique du Maroc to unexplored outcrops of the Kem Kem Beds, American paleontologist Paul Sereno found an incomplete postcranial skeleton of a theropod. This skeleton (UCRC PV11; = SGM-Din 2) was unearthed from Cenomanian-aged sandstones belonging to the upper part of the Gara Sbaa Formation at a locality known as Aferdou N'Chaft located in Errachidia, Morocco. The skeleton was found preserved in articulation, one of the few articulated dinosaur skeletons known from the Kem Kem Beds, and consists of: two dorsal ribs, two gastralia, several caudal vertebrae, eight chevrons, an incomplete scapulocoracoid, incomplete forelimbs, a partial pelvis, two partial hindlimbs, incomplete peses, and several additional fragments. In 1996, the specimen was described by Sereno and colleagues in the journal Science as a new genus and species of coelurosaurian theropod named Deltadromeus agilis. In the same description, Sereno and colleagues reassigned the referred material, including the giant femur, of Bahariasaurus that had been unearthed in 1911 and 1912 to Deltadromeus. However, Sereno and colleagues maintained that Bahariasaurus is a separate genus from Deltadromeus.

In their 2016 description of Aoniraptor, Motta et al. discussed the possibility that Bahariasaurus, along with Deltadromeus, Gualicho, and Aoniraptor, could form a clade ('Bahariasauridae') of megaraptorans distinct from megaraptorids. They did not perform a phylogenetic analysis to test these claims.

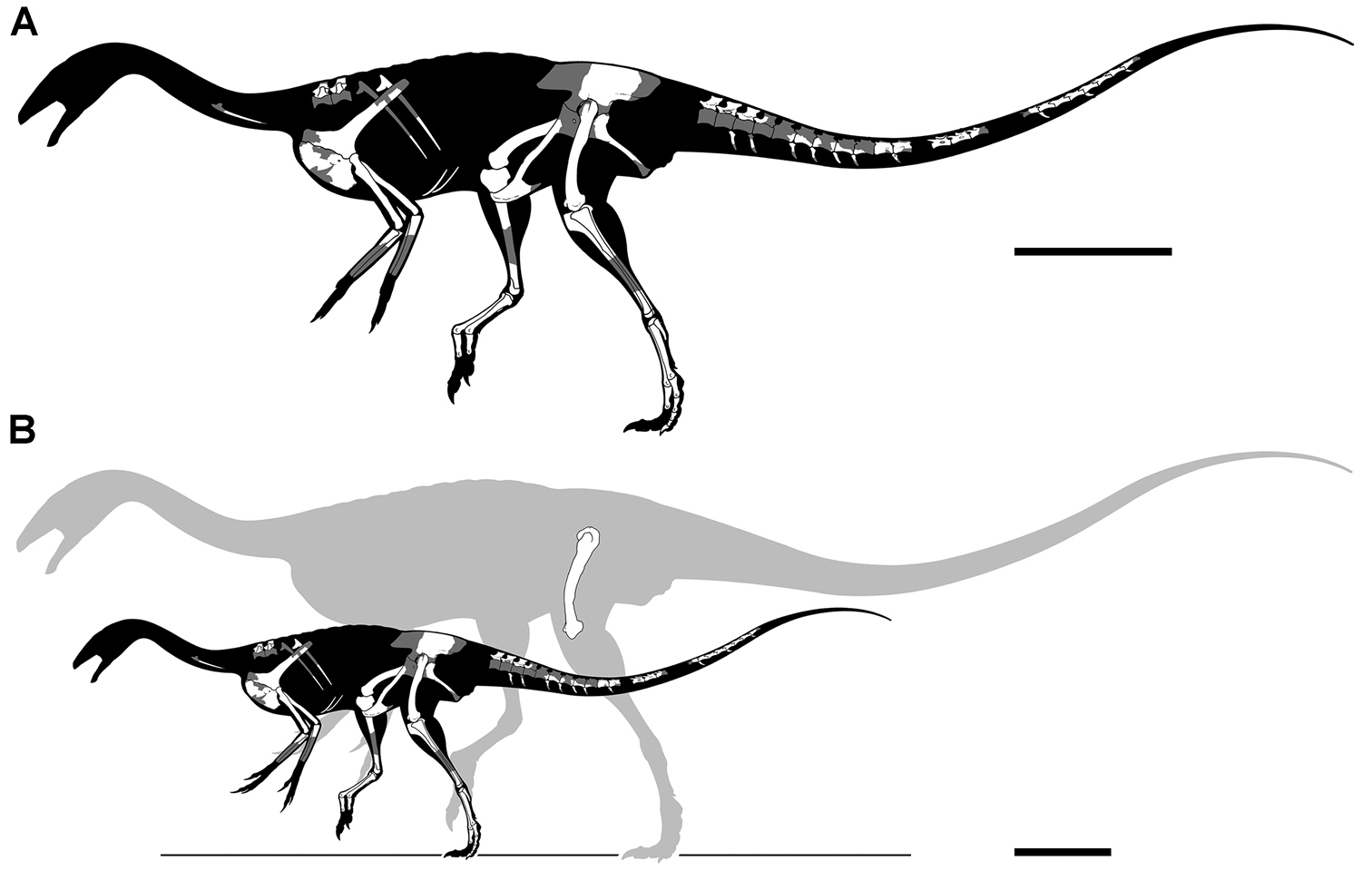
Reconstructed skeleton of Deltadromeus, a possible synonym of Bahariasaurus

The roughly contemporaneous theropod Deltadromeus, to which bones initially referred to Bahariasaurus have been referred, has been suggested to be synonymous with the latter taxon. In a 2010 analysis of the Ceratosauria, Carrano and Sampson noted that the differences between Deltadromeus and Bahariasaurus were partily due to misidentified bones in the former, and that other distinctions were subtle and insufficient to distinguish the two. In 2020, Ibrahim and colleagues acknowledged similarities between the two genera, but considered it unlikely that Deltadromeus represents a specimen of Bahariasaurus due to perceived differences in the pelvic bones. They further regarded Bahariasaurus as a nomen dubium without explanation.

In 2024, Andrea Cau published a comprehensive theropod phylogenetic framework that could be used to identify immature specimens of other taxa. He included the Bahariasaurus type specimen in his analyses and recovered it within the ceratosaur clade Abelisauroidea in a polytomy including Deltadromeus. The following year, Cau and Paterna used an updated version of this dataset to reanalyze the relationships of Bahariasaurus, Deltadromeus, and other Cretaceous theropods from Africa. They determined that the variation observed between specimens of Deltadromeus and Bahariasaurus was the result of individual and ontogenetic variation, as the former is known from immature remains. They further reidentified specimen SNSB-BSPG1912VIII82—incorrectly recognized as an indeterminate theropod pubis by Stromer in his 1934 description of Bahariasaurus—as a complete ischium. The authors observed anatomical characters that the bone shares with the less complete ischia of the holotypes of both Bahariasaurus and Deltadromeus, which they used to strengthen their argument. They concluded that Deltadromeus should be regarded as a junior synonym of Bahariasaurus. The results of their phylogenetic analysis are displayed in the cladogram below, with Bahariasaurus (including Deltadromeus) indicated in the so-called "abelisauroid clade 1".

- Abelisauroidea
  - - PRC-NF-1-21 (large Cabao Fm. taxon)
    - Kiyacursor
  - - Elaphrosaurus
    - - Berberosaurus
      - - "abelisauroid clade 1"
          - Ligabueino
          - Berthasaura
          - MNN TIG6 (referred Spinostropheus specimen)
          - Angeac-Charente taxon
          - Limusaurus
          - Bahariasaurus (including Deltadromeus)
        - - - Vespersaurus
            - Afromimus
          - - - Velocisaurus
              - Masiakasaurus
            - - Abelisauridae

== Paleoecology ==
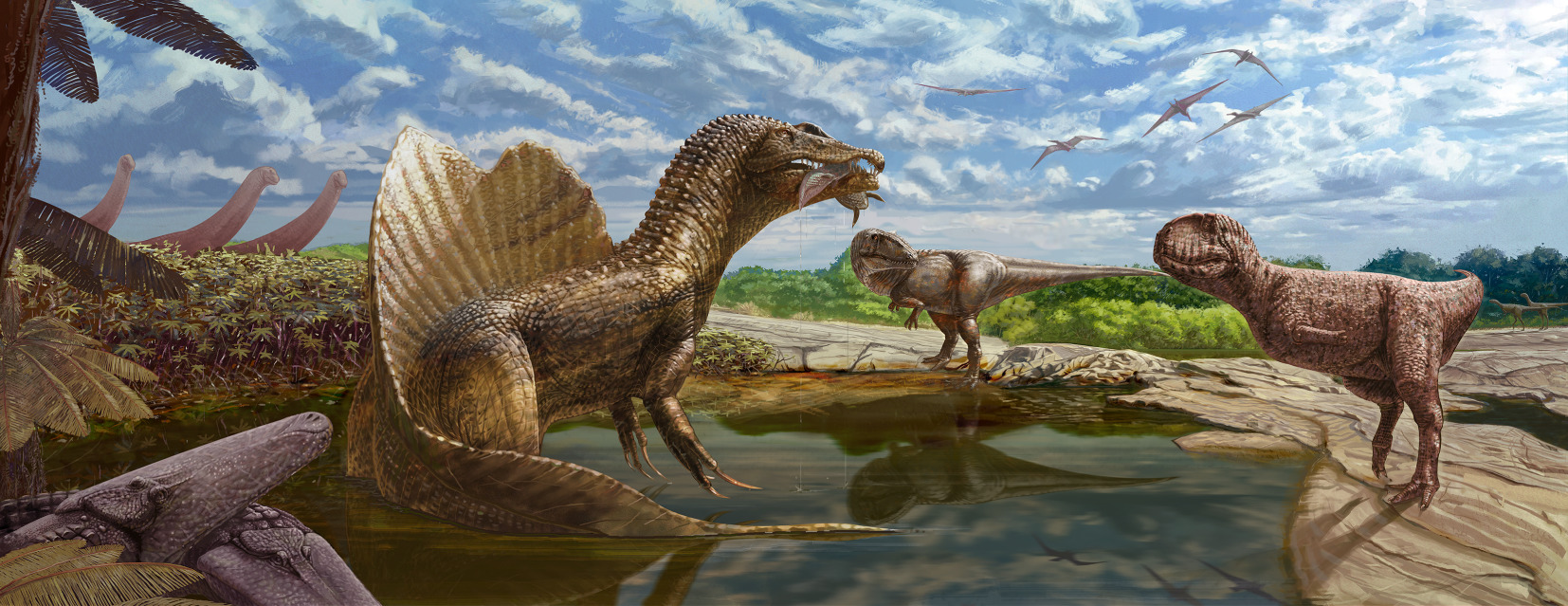
Restoration of the fauna of the Bahariya Formation, with Bahariasaurus in the right background

North Africa, during the Cenomanian stage of the Late Cretaceous, bordered the Tethys Sea, which transformed the region into a mangrove-dominated coastal environment filled with vast tidal flats and waterways. Bahariasaurus is known from the Bahariya Formation, then a wetland environment, alongside the coeval Tameryraptor and Spinosaurus, this latter being also known from the Kem Kem beds. The faunal composition of both the Bahariya Formation and the Kem Kem beds were thought to be similar in the past, but the describers of Tameryraptor suggested that such superficial comparisons require further examination. Contemporary abelisaurid dinosaurs from the Bahariya Formation were also terrestrial carnivores, preying on other terrestrial fauna. Some sauropods are also known from the same formation such as Paralititan and Aegyptosaurus. A diverse fauna of aquatic animals is known from the Bahariya Formation. Underwater life diversity exploded during this period in the mangroves of North Africa, with turtles represented by the pleurodian Apertotemporalis, large bony fish like Mawsonia and Paranogmius, sawskate Onchopristis, sharks like Squalicorax and Cretolamna, and a broad selection of invertebrates.

The composition of the dinosaur fauna of these sites is an anomaly, as there are fewer herbivorous dinosaur species relative to carnivorous dinosaurs than usual. This indicates that there was niche partitioning between the different theropod clades, with spinosaurids consuming fish while other groups hunted herbivorous dinosaurs. In North Africa, ceratosaurs are represented by Deltadromeus and unnamed noasaurids and abelisaurids in the Kem Kem Beds, an unnamed abelisaurid and Bahariasaurus itself in the Bahariya Formation, Rugops in the Echkar Formation, and Kryptops and Afromimus in the Elrhaz Formation. If Bahariasaurus is indeed an abelisauroid, it would have been related to taxa interpreted as being herbivorous or omnivorous, implying minimal resource competition with the coeval carnivorous theropods.
