= Inosaurus =

Inosaurus Temporal range: Early Cretaceous, ~145–105 Ma

Scientific classification
- Kingdom: Animalia
- Phylum: Chordata
- Class: Reptilia
- Clade: Dinosauria
- Clade: Saurischia
- Clade: Theropoda
- Genus: †Inosaurus de Lapparent, 1960

Type species
- †Inosaurus tedreftensis de Lapparent, 1960

Dubious genus of theropods

Inosaurus (meaning "In Tedreft lizard") is a dubious genus of extinct theropod dinosaur from the Early Cretaceous age "Continental intercalaire" and Echkar Formation of Niger and possibly from the Late Cretaceous age Baharija Formation of Egypt. The type, and only species, is I. tedreftensis.

== Discovery and naming ==
The holotype, eighteen vertebrae and the top end of a left tibia, was collected by Albert-Félix de Lapparent in a stratum of the Early Cretaceous "Continental intercalaire" in In Tedreft, Niger during 1953, and he described the remains later in the same year. He concluded a further five vertebrae from the Tegama Group in In Abangarit, Niger belonged to the genus in 1959, and he named and described Inosaurus tedreftensis in 1960.

Apart from these, de Lapparent also referred three caudal vertebrae, ?IPHG 1912 VIII 63c, ?IPHG 1912 VIII 63e and ?IPHG 1912 VIII 63g, described by Ernst Stromer in 1934 from the Baharija Formation of Egypt to Inosaurus, but they probably belong to an indeterminate theropod unrelated to Inosaurus.

== Description ==
All vertebrae share the same morphology, and despite being from a small animal, they are robustly built and very high with enlarged chevron facets and a median groove on the underside.

== Classification ==
de Lapparent (1960) classified Inosaurus within Megalosauridae. White (1973) and Olshevsky (1991) instead considered Inosaurus as a nomen dubium within Theropoda because of the fragmentary nature of the fossils discovered.
