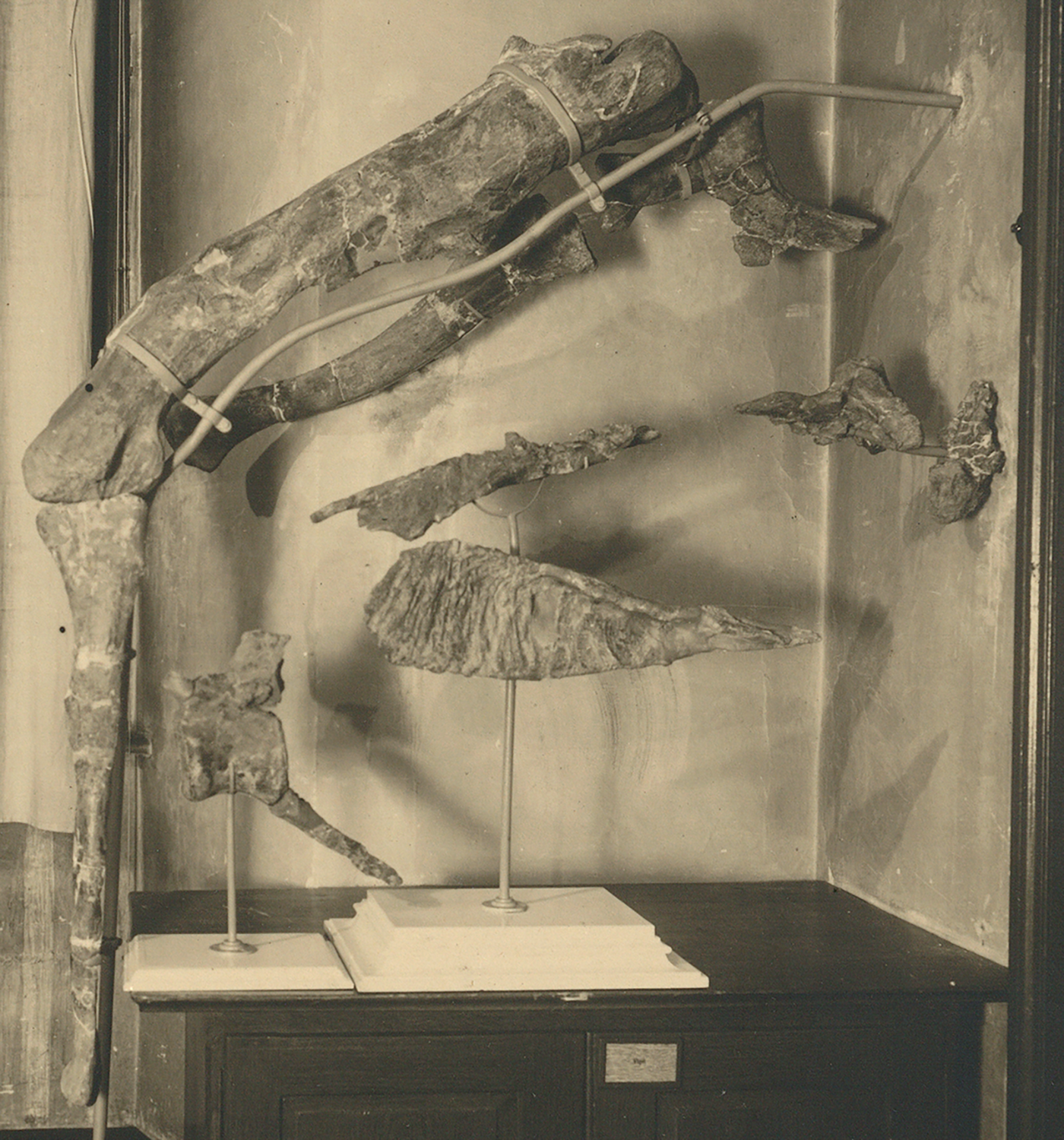
- Photograph of the holotype before its destruction in 1944
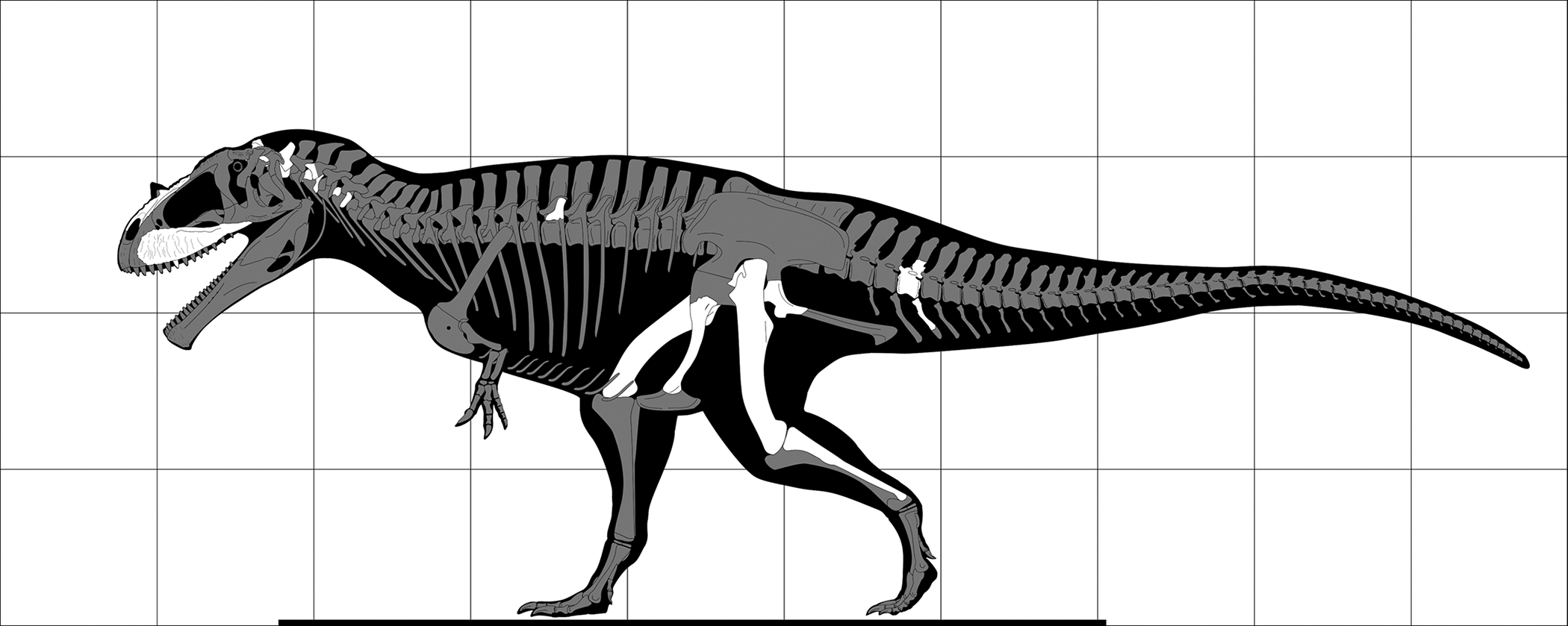
- Skeletal reconstruction of the holotype with known material in white

Scientific classification
- Kingdom: Animalia
- Phylum: Chordata
- Class: Reptilia
- Clade: Dinosauria
- Clade: Saurischia
- Clade: Theropoda
- Clade: †Carcharodontosauria
- Family: †Carcharodontosauridae
- Genus: †Tameryraptor; Kellermann, Cuesta & Rauhut, 2025
- Species: †T. markgrafi

Binomial name
- †Tameryraptor markgrafi Kellermann, Cuesta & Rauhut, 2025

= Tameryraptor =

Tameryraptor Temporal range: Late Cretaceous, Cenomanian

Genus of carcharodontosaurid dinosaurs

Tameryraptor ("thief from the beloved land") is an extinct genus of large carcharodontosaurid dinosaur that lived during the Late Cretaceous (Cenomanian age) in what is now Egypt. It is known from a partial skeleton collected in rock layers from the Bahariya Formation by crews of German paleontologist Ernst Stromer in 1914, comprising an incomplete skull, vertebrae, and several other postcranial elements. Stromer described the specimen in 1931, referring it to the previously named Megalosaurus saharicus on the basis of its tooth anatomy, and placing it in a new genus, Carcharodontosaurus. In 1944, it was destroyed in the Bombing of Munich during the Second World War. The specimen remained assigned to Carcharodontosaurus saharicus until a review of photographs of the fossil material in 2025 allowed researchers around German paleontologist Maximilian Kellermann to recognize the material as belonging to a distinct taxon known from a single species, Tameryraptor markgrafi.

Tameryraptor is one of many large carcharodontosaurid dinosaurs. It is the only known African carcharodontosaurids found that preserved a partial postcranial skeleton. Like its relatives, it had a large, lightly-built skull, but was distinct in that it bore a distinctive horn-like protuberance on its snout. Its vertebrae were sturdy but contain depressions where air sacs would be present. Several other gigantic theropods are known from Egypt during this period, including the spinosaurid Spinosaurus, the controversial Bahariasaurus, and unnamed large abelisaurids.

== Discovery and naming ==
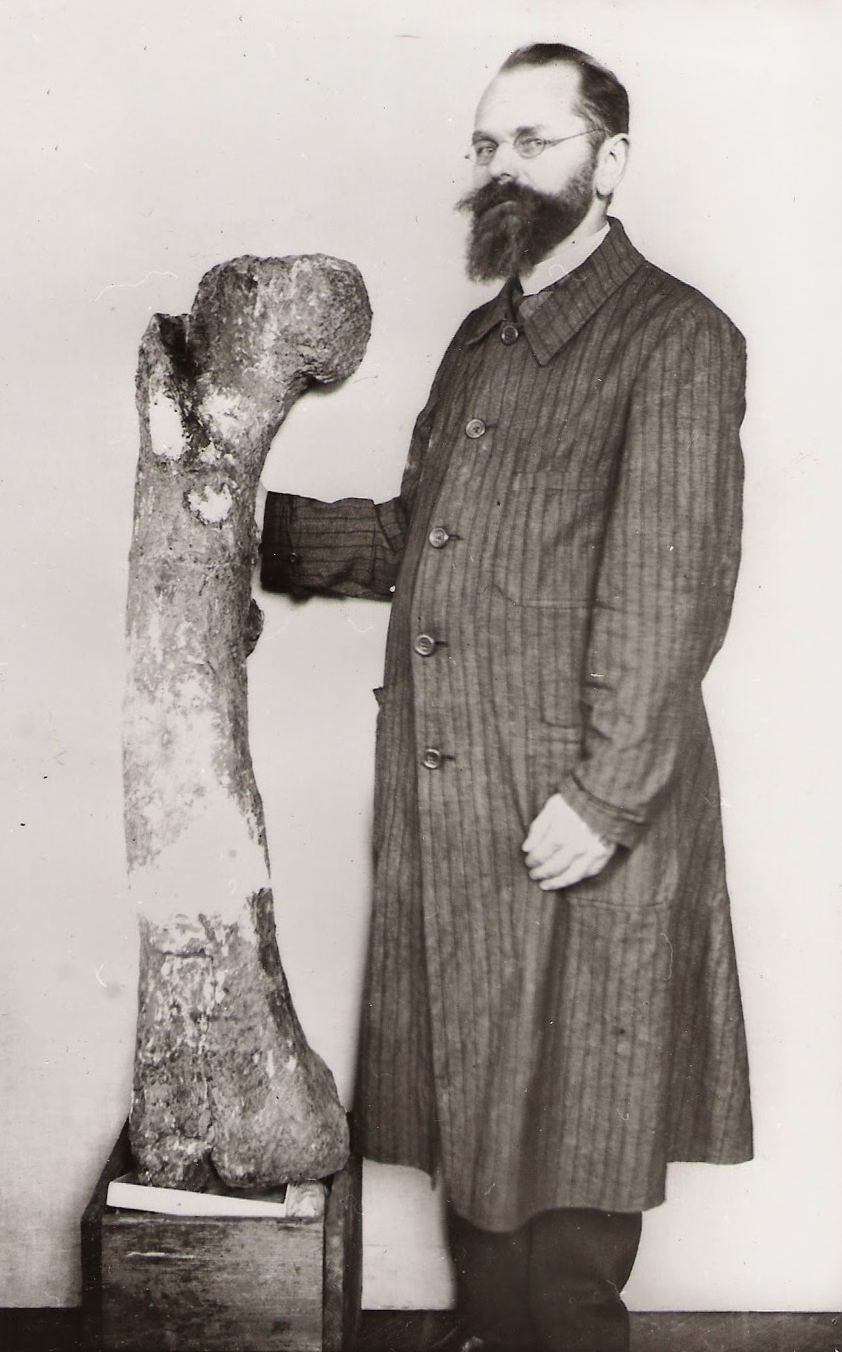
Portrait of paleontologist Ernst Stromer, the original describer of the Tameryraptor remains

In early April 1914, theropod fossils were found in marls near Ain Gedid, Egypt by Austro-Hungarian paleontologist Richard Markgraf. The sediments from this region derive from the Cenomanian-aged Bahariya Formation, one of many Cretaceous-aged sites of North Africa. Markgraf extensively collected dinosaur skeletons in Bahariya for his employer, German paleontologist Ernst Stromer of the Paläontologisches Museum München (Bavarian State Collection of Paleontology). This Egyptian skeleton (specimen number SNSB-BSPG 1922 X 46) consisted of several elements, most notably a partial skull which included the left and right nasals, much of the maxillae (upper jaw bones), an incomplete braincase, and teeth. As for the postcranial skeleton, three cervical (neck) vertebrae, one caudal (tail) vertebra, two chevrons, a partial pelvis, the proximal portion of a dorsal rib, both femora (thigh bones), and the left fibula (shin bone) were found.

Due to political tensions between the German Empire and then British-owned Egypt, this specimen took years to get to Germany. It was not until 1922 that the bones were transported to Munich, where Stromer described them in 1931. Stromer recognized that the teeth of this specimen matched the characteristic dentition of species "Megalosaurus" saharicus, originally described in 1925 by the French paleontologists Charles Depéret and Justin Savornin. Noting these unique features, Stromer found it necessary to erect a new genus for this species, Carcharodontosaurus. World War II broke out in 1939, leading to SNSB-BSPG 1922 X 46 and other Bahariya material to be destroyed during a British bombing raid on Munich during the night of 24/25 April 1944. A braincase endocast was made that survived the war, making it the only remaining relic of the specimen.

The 1990s witnessed a resurgence in carcharodontosaurid research and discoveries, with the description of a novel Carcharodontosaurus saharicus specimen from Morocco in 1996. This specimen was then designated the neotype of the species in 2007, though SNSB-BSPG 1922 X 46 was still classified as belonging to the species. The attribution of this skeleton to C. saharicus was discussed by Italian paleontologists Alessandro Chiarenza and Andrea Cau in a 2016 study. Although they recognized them as similar, they noted that the Stromer's specimen and the Moroccan neotype differed in some cranial features. In 2025, Maximilian Kellermann, Elena Cuesta, and Oliver W. M. Rauhut described Tameryraptor markgrafi as a new genus and species of carcharodontosaurid theropods based on these fossil remains. Since the fossil remains were destroyed, they established their description based on the remaining endocast, two previously unlisted archival photographs, and Stromer's initial drawings of the fossil material. The generic name, Tameryraptor, combines Ta-mery, an informal ancient Egyptian name for the country meaning 'beloved land', with the Latin word raptor, meaning 'thief'. The specific name honors Markgraf, the discoverer of the remains.

== Description ==
Size of the Carcharodontosaurus neotype (dark yellow) and Tameryraptor holotype (bright yellow) compared to a human

In 1931, Stromer estimated that the Tameryraptor holotype represented an individual similar in size to the tyrannosaurid Gorgosaurus, which has been estimated at 8–9 metres (26–30 ft) in length.

=== Skull and dentition ===
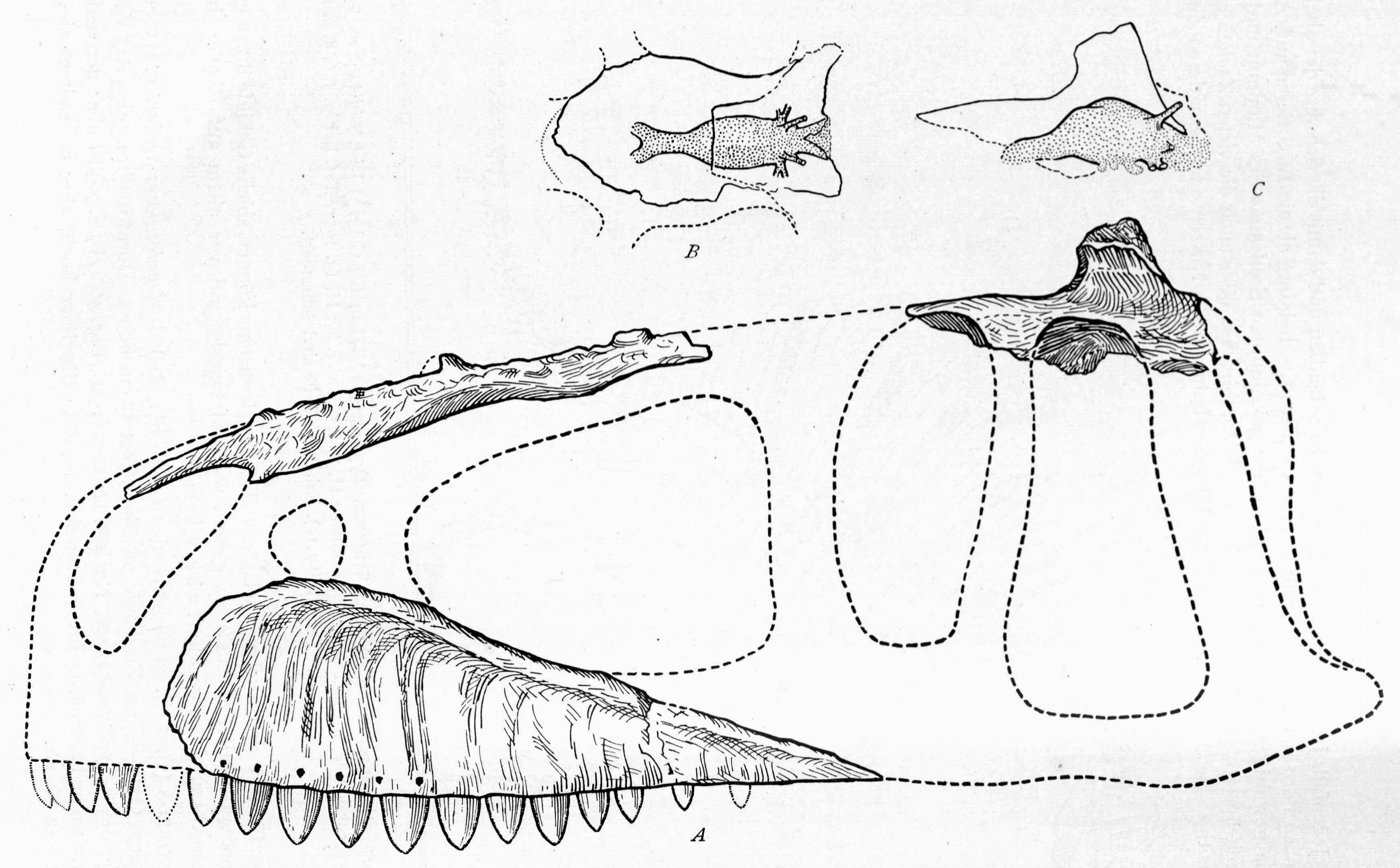
Stromer's (now outdated) reconstruction of the skull of Carcharodontosaurus saharicus using the Tameryraptor holotype

The skull Stromer described was incomplete and severely damaged, with the snout represented only by the nearly complete left and right nasals and the damaged left maxilla. The middle parts of the nasals bear strong rugosities, similar to those of other carcharodontosaurids. However, they were characterized by a horn-like protrusion, measuring 3 cm (1.2 in) in height, which is not observed in any other taxon. The horn's prominence was accentuated by a depression behind the protrusion. While comparable to the nasal horn of Ceratosaurus, a distantly related theropod, it is much less pronounced. The nasals bear a large, extended antorbital fossa (depressions on the nasal) that extends along the antorbital fenestra (a large opening in the skull in front of the eye). This feature is one of several that distinguishes Tameryraptor from other genera of carcharodontosaurid. Both maxillae were preserved though feature damage and wear. The maxilla of SNSB-BSPG 1922 X 46 would have been 70 centimetres (28 in) long when complete, whereas that of C. saharicus is much larger. The maxillae's lateral (left and right) surfaces were adorned with rugosities, vertical ridges, and furrows that were much more pronounced than in related taxa. Based on the number of alveoli (tooth sockets), the maxillae bore either 12 or 13 teeth, a lower count than in Carcharodontosaurus.

The rear portion of the skull was represented by the parietals (side and roof of cranium), frontals (front-top of cranium), part of the supraoccipital (bottom rear of cranium), and partial occiput (region in the lower back portion of the cranium). Overall, the braincase and posterior (back portion) skull were comparable to those of Carcharodontosaurus, Acrocanthosaurus, Giganotosaurus, and Meraxes. The frontals were convex on their exposed portion in contrast to the flat frontals of related genera. The supraoccipital features a prominent dorsal crest that extends towards the paroccipital (lateral side of occipital) process, similar to that of Meraxes. The prefrontal facet (area where the frontal joins the prefrontal) on the frontal was not expanded, a characteristic unique to Tameryraptor among Carcharodontosauridae. The maxillary teeth of Tameryraptor were more symmetrical and triangular than those of Carcharodontosaurus, similar to a tooth fragment from the Kem Kem Group in Morocco and an isolated tooth that has been assigned to Mapusaurus. Like the teeth of other carcharodontosaurids, those of Tameryraptor bore horizontal enamel wrinkles.

=== Postcranial skeleton ===
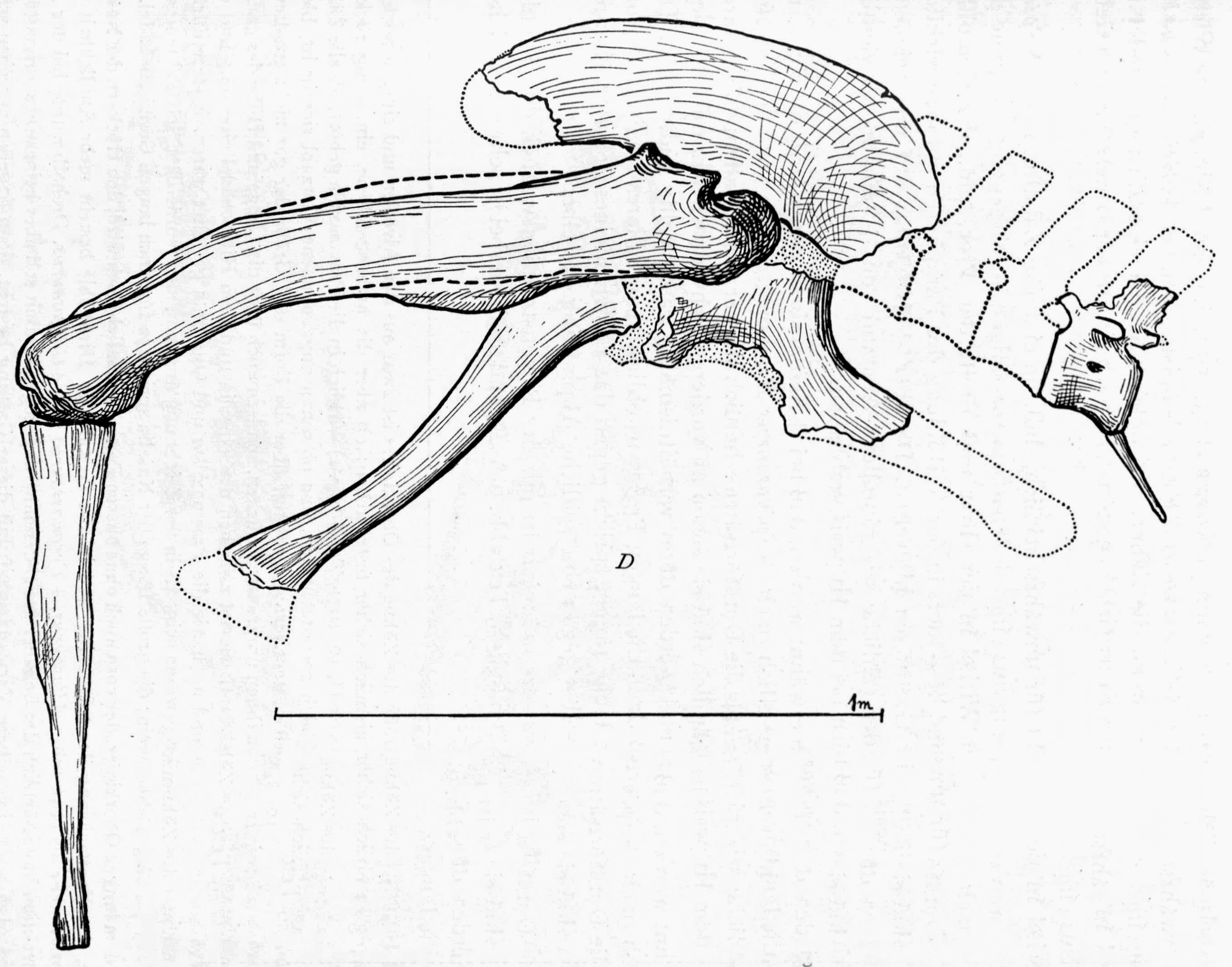
Stromer's reconstruction of the pelvis and left hindlimb of the Tameryraptor holotype

The Tameryraptor holotype is currently the only known carcharodontosaurid from Africa found with a partial postcranial skeleton, and is even one of the most complete known representatives outside of South America. This specimen preserved three cervical vertebrae, which were weathered severely. One was the axis, and the other two were anterior (front) cervicals that were larger than the axis. The axis was wider than tall, though incomplete, and bears parapophyses about halfway on its height on both of its sides. Its short neural spine was inclined backwards and closely resembles the axes of derived carcharodontosaurids, but contrasts with those of the high-spined Neovenator and Acrocanthosaurus. The cervical vertebrae, similar to the related Giganotosaurus, were topped by low neural spines joined with sturdy transverse processes which hung over the pleurocoels (shallow depressions on the sides of centra), which would contain pneumatic air sacs to lighten the vertebrae. The centra of these vertebrae have keels along their ventral sides. The middle cervical vertebra preserved, possibly the 4th position cervical, was opisthocoelous (convex anterior ends of central, concave posterior ends) as in carcharodontosaurines. The ratio of transversal width to anterior centrum height was 1.3, making the vertebra much wider than the cervical vertebrae preserved in carcharodontosaurids like Giganotosaurus and Tyrannotitan but more similar to that of Allosaurus, a relatively basal theropod. The third cervical vertebra described was unfigured and poorly preserved, though was apparently more posterior along the neck. An anterior caudal vertebra was also known, which was platycoelous (flat anterior and posterior ends) and short. This vertebra was incomplete, missing much of the neural spine. The sides of its centrum were pleurocoelus as well. The caudal vertebra was strongly pneumatized, with the centrum covered in pneumatic foramina (openings in bone), a trait potentially diagnostic of Tameryraptor. Two haemal arches, or chevrons, were preserved in this individual as well.

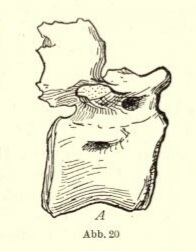
The partial caudal vertebra from the holotype

The pelvis was incomplete, containing both pubes and the left ischium. Uniquely, the ischium pointed almost directly horizontally. The pubes were likely nearly 1 metre (3.3 ft) when fully preserved, with thin shafts that were transversely expanded at the anterior ends where they connected, creating a V-shape in anterior view. The public shafts were strongly curved laterally, a condition observed in some related taxa, but from anterior view lacked intense curvature. As for the ischium, it was very incomplete, preserving primarily the proximal portion, but was firmly pointed downward. Both femora, in addition to the left fibula, were recovered, the former element being one of the largest recorded from a theropod at 1.26 metres (4.1 ft) in length. Its femora lacked strong curvature, though it was damaged during its transport to Germany. The lesser trochanter (a projection from the shaft of the femur) well developed with a strong separation from the larger greater trochanter. Additionally, the fourth trochanter is similarly well-developed and clearly visible in illustrations and photographs of the specimen. These traits are typical of basal carcharodontosaurids but contrast with the weakly developed lesser and fourth trochanters of Giganotosaurus and Mapusaurus. However, the accessory trochanter is "spike-like", a trait distinguishing Tameryraptor from other carcharodontosaurids. Its fibula was only 88 centimetres (35 in) long, around 1/3rd the length of the femora. The anterior end was triangular in lateral view with bulging condyles, whereas the posterior end was rounded, a trait distinguishing Tameryraptor from other carcharodontosaurids.

== Classification ==
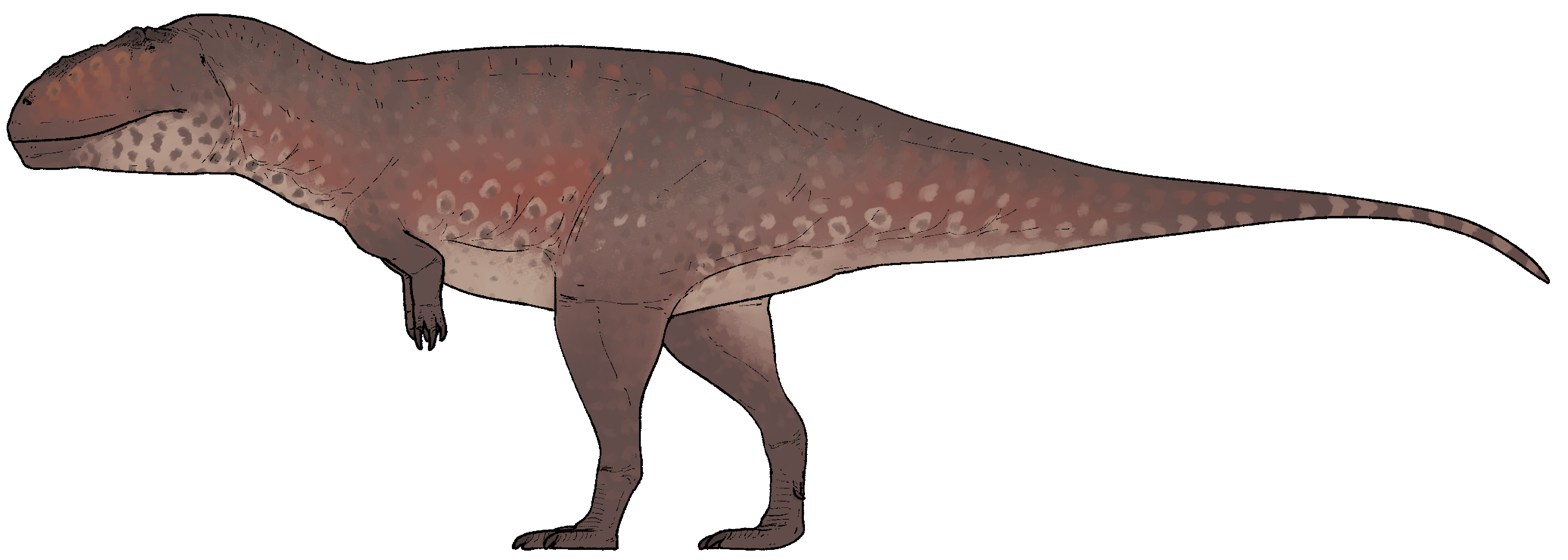
Speculative life restoration

Tameryraptor is a genus in the family Carcharodontosauridae but, like the genera Acrocanthosaurus and Lajasvenator, has been classified outside of the subfamily Carcharodontosaurinae. The fossils now assigned to Tameryraptor were used by Stromer to create Carcharodontosauridae, a clade that originally only included Carcharodontosaurus and Bahariasaurus. Stromer noted the likeness of Tameryraptor, then assigned to Carcharodontosaurus, bones to the American theropods Allosaurus and Tyrannosaurus, leading him to consider the family part of Theropoda. Carcharodontosauridae has since been expanded, with genera described from the Jurassic and/or Cretaceous of every continent except Antarctica. The peak of diversity and size of the group was during the mid-Cretaceous, with members like Giganotosaurus and Carcharodontosaurus itself reaching over 10 metres (33 ft) in length.

In a 1995 paper, Rauhut analyzed the systematics of Carcharodontosaurus—though this was based on the material now referred to Tameryraptor—and Bahariasaurus. Rauhut theorized that Carcharodontosaurus and Bahariasaurus were the only two named members of Carcharodontosauridae, but that the family may have originated in Tanzania. This was based on "Allosaurus" tendagurensis and "Megalosaurus" ingens, which are two theropods known from fragmentary remains from the Late Jurassic Tendaguru Formation. However, later studies have not supported these conclusions, with Bahariasaurus being suggested to be a ceratosaur, "A." tendagurensis being an indeterminate tetanuran, and "M." ingens possibly being a species of Torvosaurus.

In their phylogenetic analyses, Kellermann, Cuesta & Rauhut (2025) recovered Tameryraptor as a non-carcharodontosaurine member of the Carcharodontosauridae in both analyses they conducted. This implies that Tameryraptor was more basal than the highly derived carcharodontosaurids from South America like Meraxes and Tyrannotitan, but also more basal than Carcharodontosaurus, to which it was initially referred. Additionally, both phylogenetic analyses resulted in Tameryraptor being at a similar grade as Acrocanthosaurus. The results of their analysis using merged OTUs (operational taxonomic units) is displayed in the cladogram below:

- Carcharodontosauriformes
  - Metriacanthosauridae
  - Carcharodontosauridae
    - - Lusovenator
      - Lajasvenator
    - - Acrocanthosaurus
      - - Tameryraptor
        - - Carcharodontosaurus iguidensis
          - Carcharodontosaurinae
            - - Taurovenator
              - Carcharodontosaurus saharicus
            - Giganotosaurini
              - Meraxes
              - - Tyrannotitan
                - - Mapusaurus
                  - Giganotosaurus

In a 2025 analysis of large Cretaceous theropods from Africa, partly focused on carcharodontosaurids, Cau and Alessandro Paterna recovered Tameryraptor in a later-diverging position, as the sister taxon of Carcharodontosaurus saharicus. They hypothesized that the allegedly 'primitive' anatomy observed by Kellermann, Cuesta & Rauhut earlier that year was a unique trait of Tameryraptor, rather than an indication of more basal relationships.

=== Evolution ===
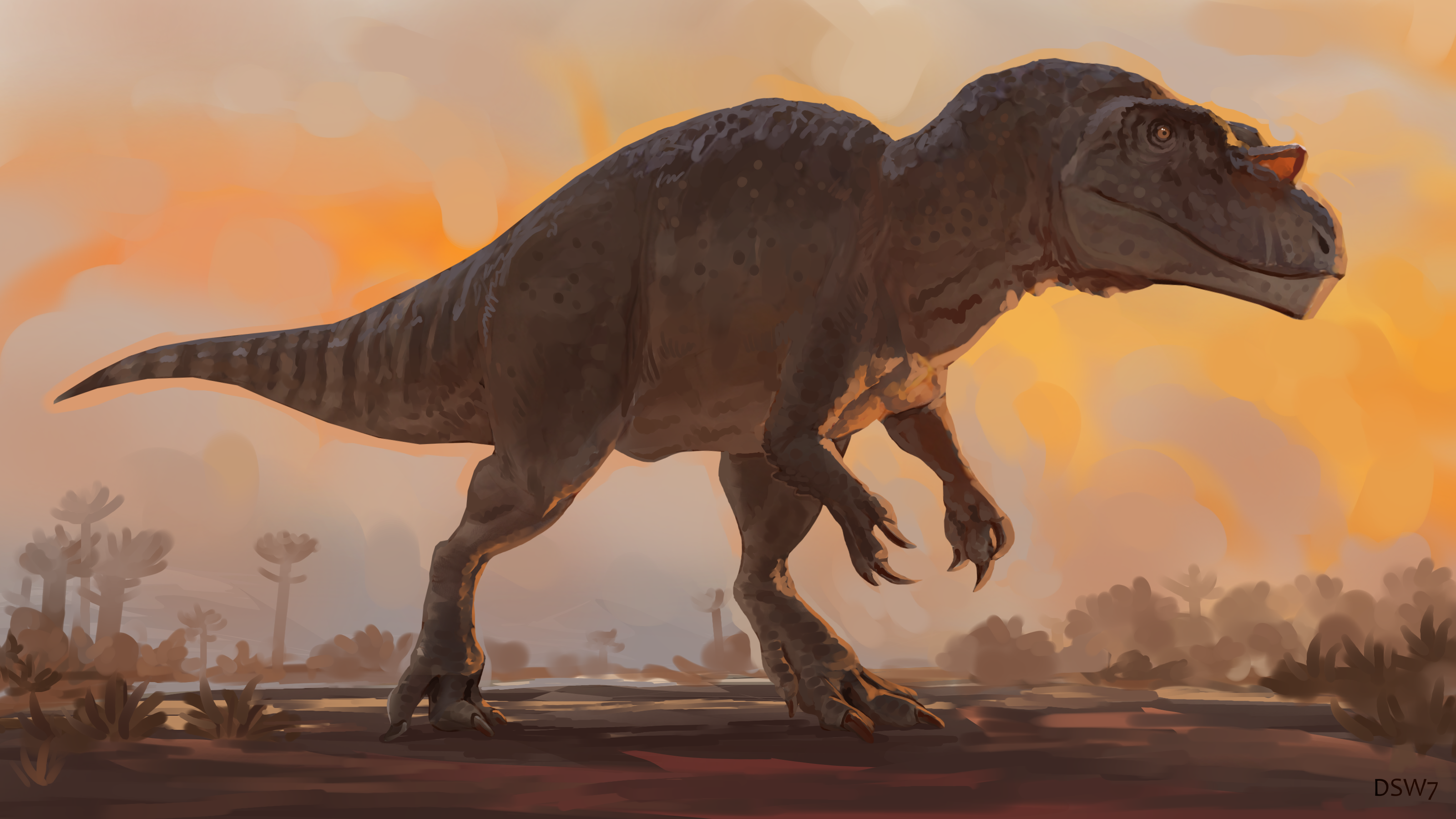
Speculative restoration of Tameryraptor in its environment

Gigantism in theropods evolved independently in separate groups (convergent evolution), with Rodolfo Coria and Leonardo Salgado suggesting it was linked to common conditions in their environments or ecosystems. Sereno and colleagues found that the presence of carcharodontosaurids in Africa (Carcharodontosaurus), North America (Acrocanthosaurus), and South America (Giganotosaurus) showed the group had a transcontinental distribution by the Early Cretaceous period. Dispersal routes between the northern and southern continents appear to have been severed by ocean barriers in the Late Cretaceous, which led to more distinct, provincial faunas by preventing exchange. Previously, it was thought that the Cretaceous world was biogeographically separated, with the northern continents being dominated by tyrannosaurids, South America by abelisaurids, and Africa by carcharodontosaurids.

The description of Tameryraptor highlighted the underestimated diversity of theropod taxa in North Africa during the mid-Cretaceous, with Kellermann, Cuesta & Rauhut stating that the Bahariya and Kem Kem theropods may not be conspecific but instead belong to distinct genera, a view held in some prior studies. Although the similarity of the ages of the two locales has been used to justify this view, in actuality, little direct analysis or comparison of fossil material has been made. This is further complicated by the destruction of the Munich collection and the lack of in-depth descriptions of Moroccan material. The lack of genus overlap in other tetrapods from the two sites, but the supposed overlap of genera like Spinosaurus and Carcharodontosaurus, was also noted by the study. It is for these reasons that the researchers stated that the evolution of large theropod dinosaurs in similarly-aged strata in Brazil, Egypt, Morocco, and Argentina resulted in greater biodiversity of genera and species than previously hypothesized.

== Paleobiology ==
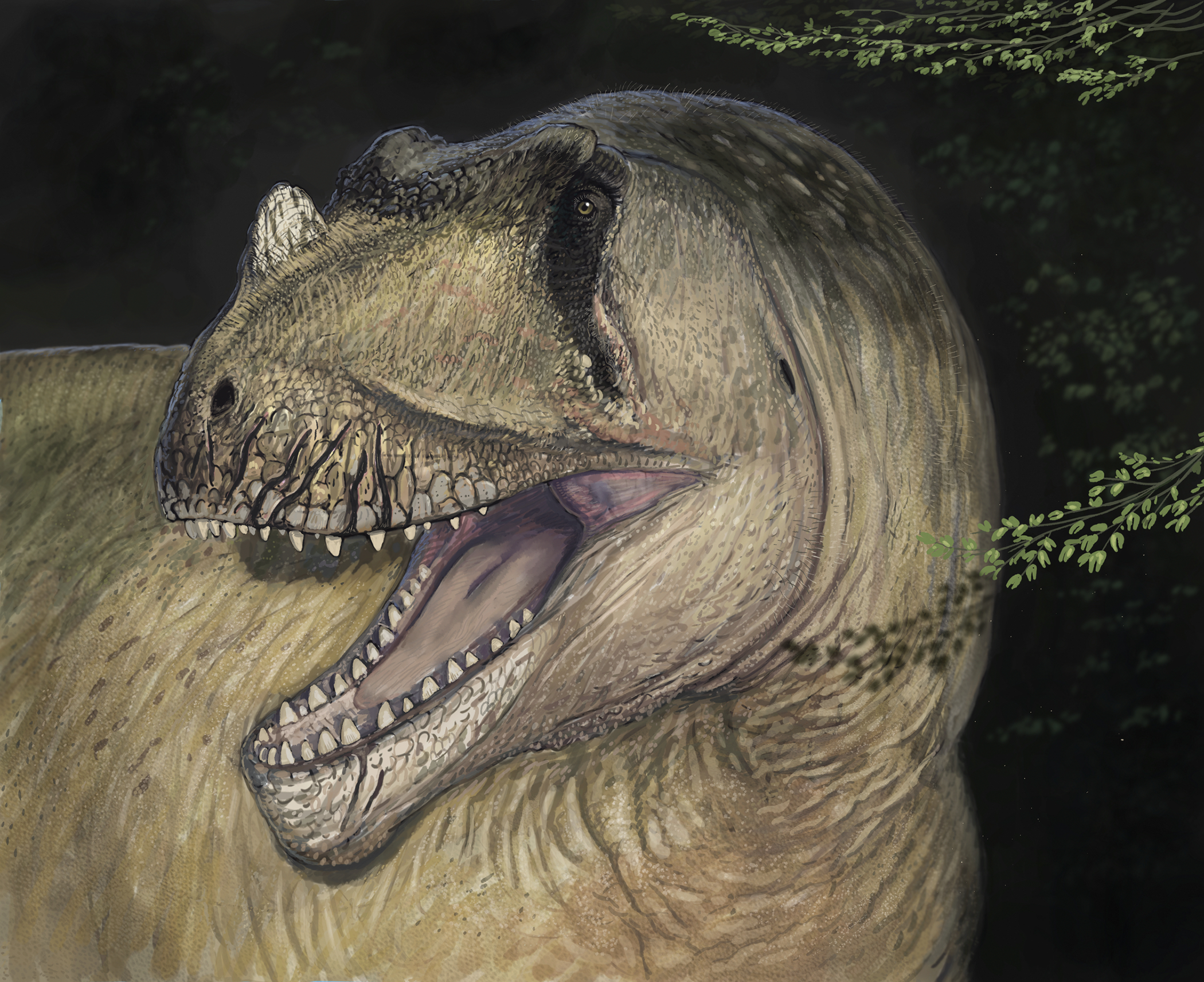
Speculative life restoration of Tameryraptor with a nasal horn covered in extensive keratin

The function of the small nasal horn of Tameryraptor was discussed in its description, with the possibility of its presence being a result of sexual dimorphism. However, this was dismissed as no other theropod genera with crests or horns, such as Ceratosaurus, Allosaurus, and Majungasaurus, preserve definitive sexual dimorphism in their skull ornamentation. Other theropods, such as Carcharodontosaurus, Allosaurus, and Acrocanthosaurus also have enlarged crests, whose purpose is unknown. Paleontologist Daniel Chure hypothesized that these crests were used for "head-butting" between individuals, but how durable they are has not been studied.

The dentition of allosauroids is distinct, with carcharodontosaurid teeth bearing distinctly thin and blade-like teeth. However, these teeth are thin and likely could not sustain impact against hard surfaces like bone without potentially bending and snapping. This danger is exacerbated by the straight edges, slightly recurved tips, and sinusoidal shapes observed in their dentition. Despite these traits, the teeth are still much more robust than those of smaller theropods and, due to their overall size, could take more pressure.

== Paleoecology ==
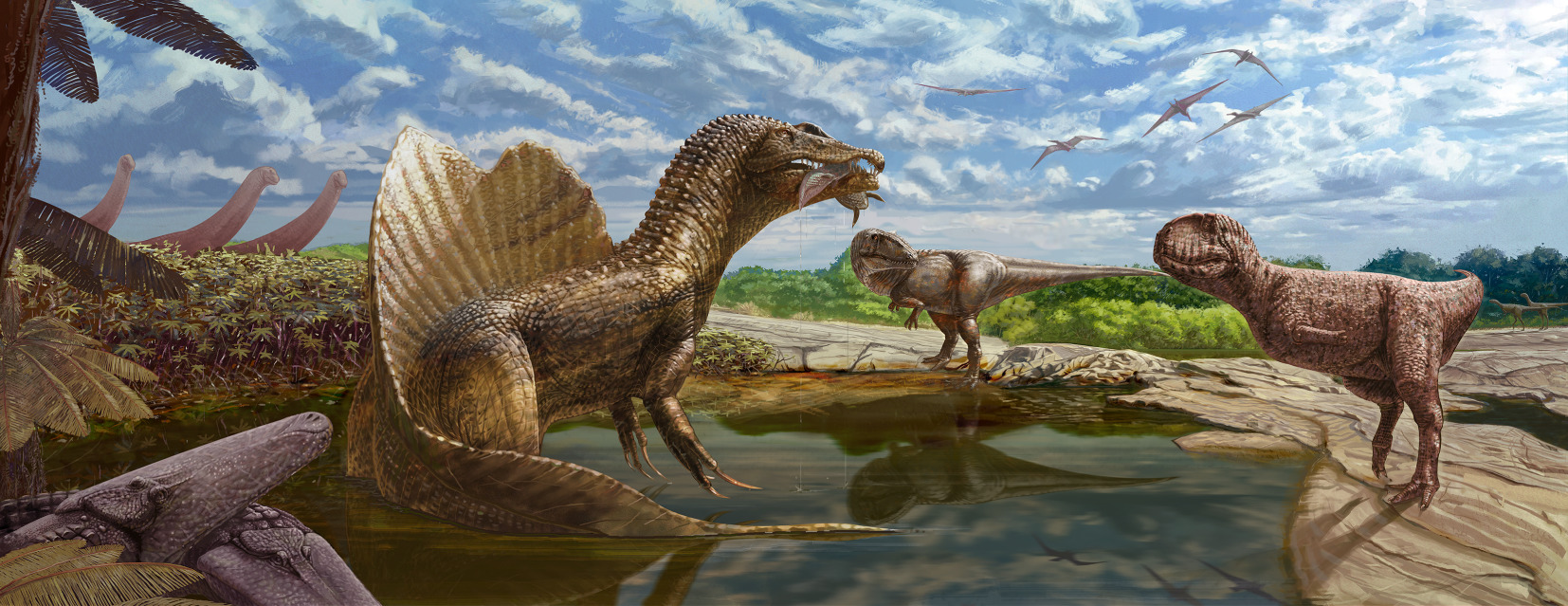
Restoration of the fauna of the Bahariya Formation, with Tameryraptor in the center background

North Africa, during the Cenomanian stage of the Late Cretaceous, bordered the Tethys Sea, which transformed the region into a mangrove-dominated coastal environment filled with vast tidal flats and waterways. Tameryraptor is known from the Bahariya Formation, then a wetland environment, alongside the coeval Bahariasaurus and Spinosaurus, with the latter being also known from the Kem Kem beds. The faunal composition of both the Bahariya Formation and the Kem Kem beds were thought to be similar in the past, but the describers of Tameryraptor suggested that such superficial comparisons require further examination. Contemporary abelisaurid dinosaurs from the Bahariya Formation were also terrestrial carnivores, preying on other terrestrial fauna. Some sauropods are also known from the same formation such as Paralititan and Aegyptosaurus. A diverse fauna of aquatic animals is known from the Bahariya Formation. Underwater life diversity exploded during this period in the mangroves of North Africa, with turtles represented by the pleurodian Apertotemporalis, large bony fish like Mawsonia and Paranogmius, sawskates Onchopristis and Schizorhiza, sharks like Squalicorax and Cretolamna, and a broad selection of invertebrates.

The composition of the dinosaur fauna of these sites is an anomaly, as there are fewer herbivorous dinosaur species relative to carnivorous dinosaurs than usual. This indicates that there was niche partitioning between the different theropod clades, with spinosaurids consuming fish while other groups hunted herbivorous dinosaurs. In North Africa, carcharodontosaurids are represented by C. saharicus and Sauroniops in the Kem Kem Beds, Eocarcharia and potentially Carcharodontosaurus in the Elrhaz Formation, and C. iguidensis in the Echkar Formation.
