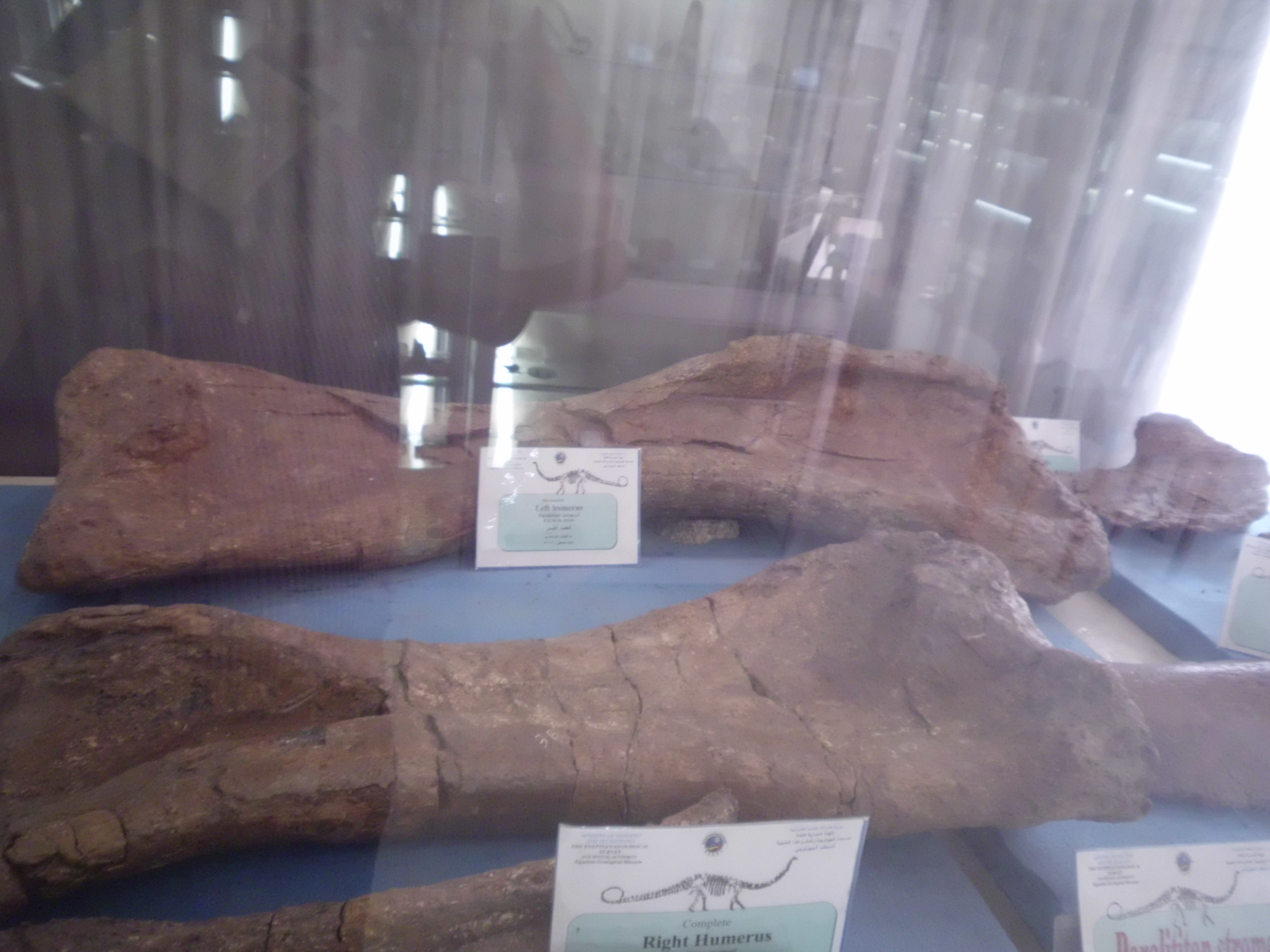
- Humeri (upper arm bones) of Paralititan at the Egyptian Geological Museum

Scientific classification
- Kingdom: Animalia
- Phylum: Chordata
- Class: Reptilia
- Clade: Dinosauria
- Clade: Saurischia
- Clade: †Sauropodomorpha
- Clade: †Sauropoda
- Clade: †Eusauropoda
- Clade: †Macronaria
- Clade: †Titanosauria
- Clade: †Lithostrotia
- Genus: †Paralititan; Smith et al., 2001
- Species: †P. stromeri

Binomial name
- †Paralititan stromeri Smith et al., 2001

= Paralititan =

Paralititan Temporal range: Late Cretaceous, Cenomanian

Genus of a titanosaurian sauropod dinosaur

Paralititan (meaning "tidal giant") is a genus of sauropod dinosaur that lived in present-day Egypt during the Late Cretaceous period. It was described by American paleontologist Joshua B. Smith and colleagues in 2001. The genus contains a single species, Paralititan stromeri, named based on a fragmentary skeleton including vertebrae and limb bones. These fossils were unearthed by an American expedition to the Bahariya Oasis in western Egypt in rock layers of the Bahariya Formation. This formation dates to the Cenomanian stage of the Late Cretaceous, which lasted 101 to 94 million years ago. An incomplete dorsal (back) vertebra that had been described by German paleontologist Ernst Stromer in 1932 was also assigned to Paralititan. However, this vertebra had been destroyed during the Bombing of Munich in World War II.

Like other sauropods, Paralititan was a four-legged herbivore with a long neck ending in a small head. It was at one point considered one of the largest dinosaurs known. More recent estimates place it at 26 meters (85 feet) in length and 30–55 tonnes (33.1–60.6 short tons) in mass. This would make it a large sauropod, but not as huge as genera like Argentinosaurus and Puertasaurus. Its robust humerus (upper arm bone) is 1.69 meters (5.5 feet) in length and bears a large deltopectoral crest (a forward directed bony flange). The caudal (tail) vertebrae are wider than tall and lack pleurocoels (large cavities that stored air sacs) on their sides.

Paralititan is a member of the Saltasauridae, a family within the sauropod group Titanosauria. Some saltasaurids, including Saltasaurus itself, preserve dorsal osteoderms (bones formed in the skin), though such bones are unknown for Paralititan. Paralititan coexisted with other dinosaurs such as the sauropod Aegyptosaurus, the theropods Tameryraptor, Spinosaurus, and Bahariasaurus, and an unnamed abelisaurid theropod. During the Cenomanian, the Bahariya Formation was on the margin of the Tethys Sea, and represented a large network of mangrove swamps, rivers, and tidal flats.

== Discovery ==
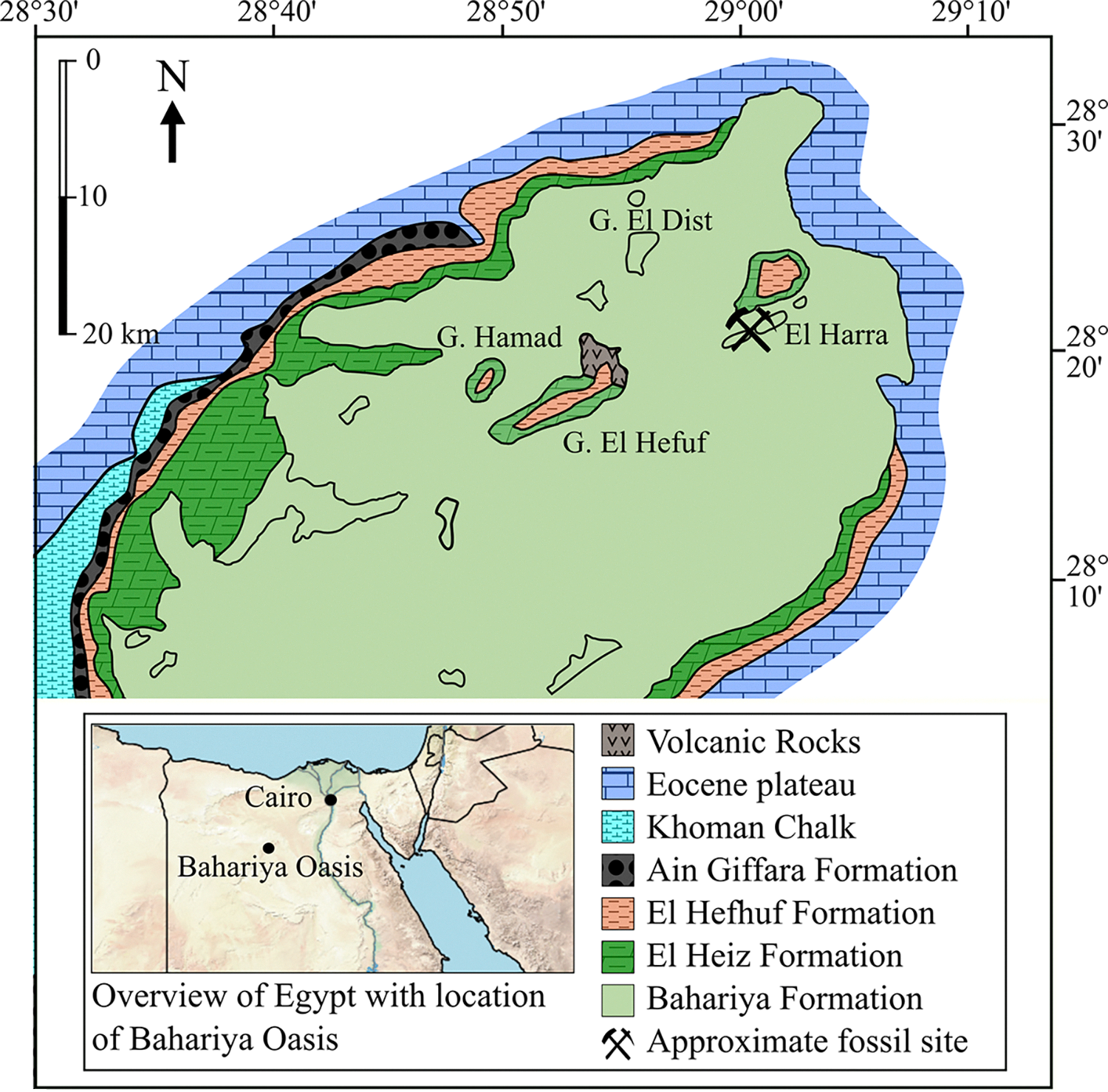
Geological map of the Bahariya Oasis, where fossils of Paralititan were unearthed

In 1999, researcher Joshua Smith rediscovered a site in the Bahariya Oasis of Egypt, known as Gebel el Dist, that had formerly been explored by Austro-Hungarian paleontologist Richard Markgraf between 1912 and 1914. The fossils that Markgraf found, including those of dinosaurs like Spinosaurus and Tameryraptor, had been shipped to Germany where they were described by German paleontologist Ernst Stromer. Markgraf had evidently removed all more complete skeletons, leaving only limited remains behind. In 2000, an American expedition was mounted to revisit the site but failed to find any dinosaur skeletons. At a new site, the nearby Gebel Fagga, the expedition succeeded in locating a partial sauropod skeleton.

This incomplete skeleton consists of two sacrals (hip vertebrae, probably the 5th and 6th), the first caudal (tail vertebra), another caudal from the front portion of the tail, dorsal and sacral ribs, incomplete scapulae (shoulder blades), a complete right and an incomplete left humerus (upper arm bone), the lower end of a metacarpal, and several additional elements. All of these fossils were transported to the Egyptian Geological Museum, Cairo and deposited under catalog number CGM 81119. Gebel Fagga and Gebel el Dist are sandstone outcrops of the Bahariya Formation, dating to the Cenomanian stage of the Late Cretaceous period. This makes these fossils around 101 to 94 million years ago old.

In 2001, an international crew made up of paleontologist Joshua B. Smith and colleagues described the partial skeleton as a new genus and species of sauropod dinosaur, named Paralititan stromeri. They established this skeleton, CGM 81119, as the holotype (name-bearing) specimen. The generic name, Paralititan, derives from the Greek para, meaning 'near', halos 'sea', and titan, as in the Greek Titans. The specific name is in honor of Stromer, who first established the presence of dinosaur fossils in the Bahariya Oasis during a 1911 expedition. The entire name therefore translates to "Stromer's tidal titan" or "Stromer's tidal giant", in reference to the paralic tidal flats the dinosaur lived on.

Additionally, Smith and colleagues assigned a large anterior dorsal (vertebra from the front portion of the trunk), cataloged at the Paläontologisches Museum München (Bavarian State Collection of Paleontology) under SNSB-BSPG 1912V11164, to Paralititan stromeri. Stromer, in 1932, assumed that this vertebra belonged to an undetermined "Giant Sauropod", but it was destroyed alongside other fossils from the Bahariya Formation during the Bombing of Munich in World War II. Several isolated sauropod fossils, mainly consisting of caudal vertebrae, were assigned by Stromer to the other Bahariya sauropod Aegyptosaurus, but these may belong to Paralititan instead.

== Description ==
Hypothetical scale diagram comparing Paralititan to some humans, with some of the known material in white.

=== Size ===
Only 5.1% of Paralititan's skeleton is known, so its exact size is difficult to estimate. The limited material, especially the long humeri, suggested that it was one of the most massive dinosaurs ever discovered, with an estimated weight of 59 t (65 short tons) according to a 2001 study. Joshua Smith, who informally led the research team that found Paralititan, told an interviewer, "It was a truly enormous dinosaur by any reckoning". The complete right humerus measures 1.69 meters (5.5 feet) long which at the time of discovery was the longest known in a Cretaceous sauropod; this was surpassed in 2016 with the discovery of the titanosaur Notocolossus, which includes a 1.76 m (5 ft 9 in) humerus. Using Saltasaurus as a guide, American paleontologist Kenneth Carpenter estimated its length at around 26 m (85 ft) in a 2006 study.

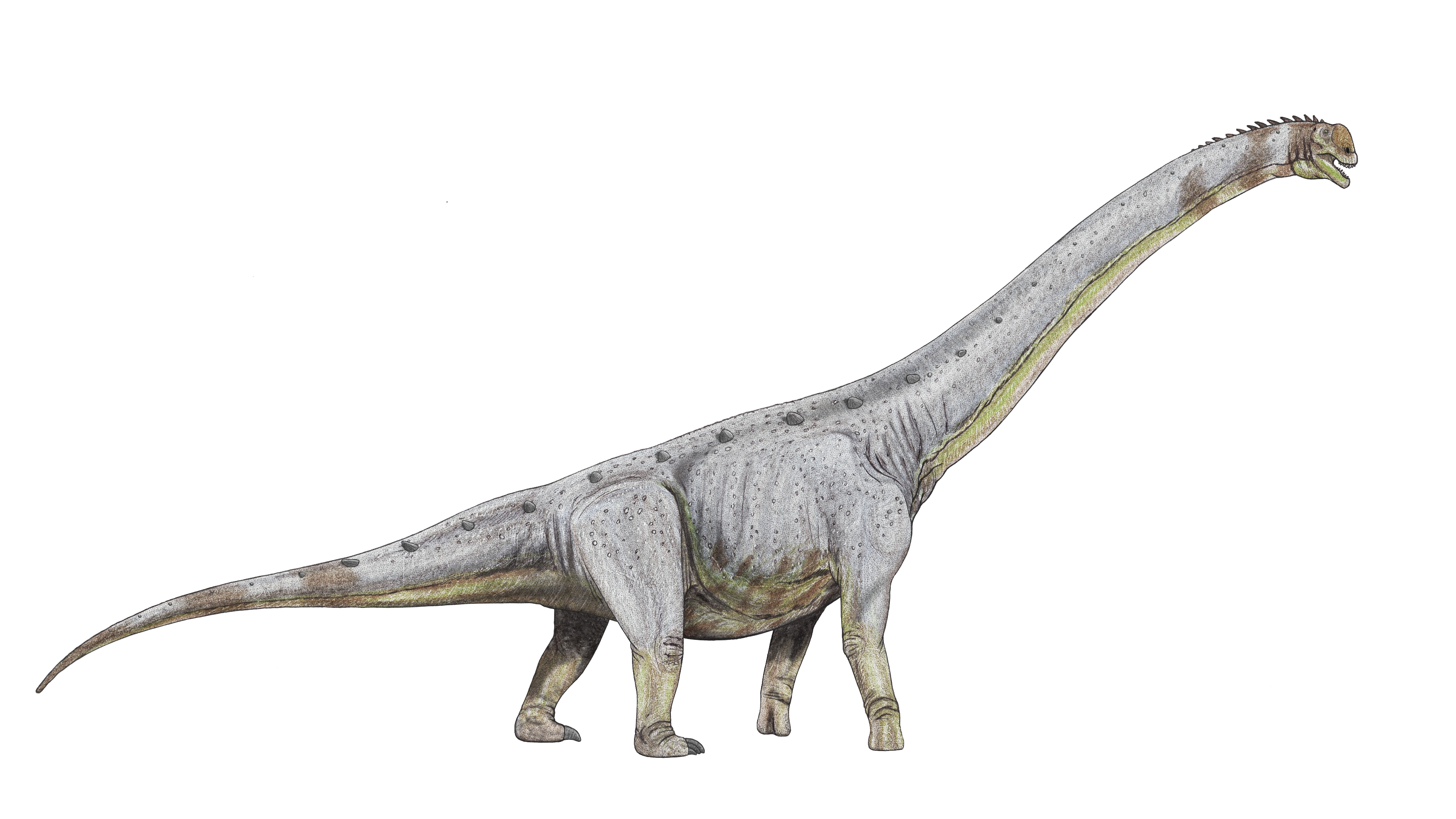
Life restoration

American researcher Scott Hartman estimated that the animal was massive, but still smaller than the biggest titanosaurs such as Puertasaurus, Alamosaurus, and Argentinosaurus. In the 2010 edition of his book The Princeton Field Guide to Dinosaurs, American researcher Gregory S. Paul estimated its length at 20+ meters (66+ ft), and its weight at 20 tonnes (24.2 short tons). In 2016, using equations that estimate body mass based on the circumference of the humerus and femur of quadrupedal animals, Argentine paleontologist Bernardo González Riga and colleagues gave a weight estimate of ~50 t (55.1 short tons) for Paralititan. In 2019, Paul estimated Paralititan between 30 and 55 tonnes (33.1–60.6 short tons) in weight.

=== Skeleton ===
The sacral vertebrae of Paralititan lack pleurocoels, large spaces in the sides of the vertebra that stored pneumatic air sacs. Air sacs made vertebrae lighter and were part of the respiratory system. The absence of pleurocoels on the caudal vertebrae is common amongst titanosaurids, supporting its assignment to the group. One of the proximal (towards body) caudal vertebrae has a wider than tall, procoelous centrum with a convex rear articular condyle. In contrast to other titanosaurs like Alamosaurus and Neuquensaurus, the centrum is not convex on both ends. The ventral (bottom) surface of the centrum has weakly pronounced ridges that border a sagittal concavity. The other proximal caudal vertebra found has a strongly procoelus centrum with a well-developed distal condyle. The scapula (shoulder blade) has a medial (inner) concavity that is bordered by a prominent rugosity, like in the titanosaurs Aeolosaurus, Lirainosaurus, Neuquensaurus, and Saltasaurus. As in the brachiosaurid Brachiosaurus, Paralititan bears a prominent tabular process on the caudoventral (rear-bottom) part of the scapula underneath the glenoid socket (the part of the scapula that articulates with the humerus). This feature is only found in Brachiosaurus and Paralititan, demonstrating that it is a unique genus of titanosaur.

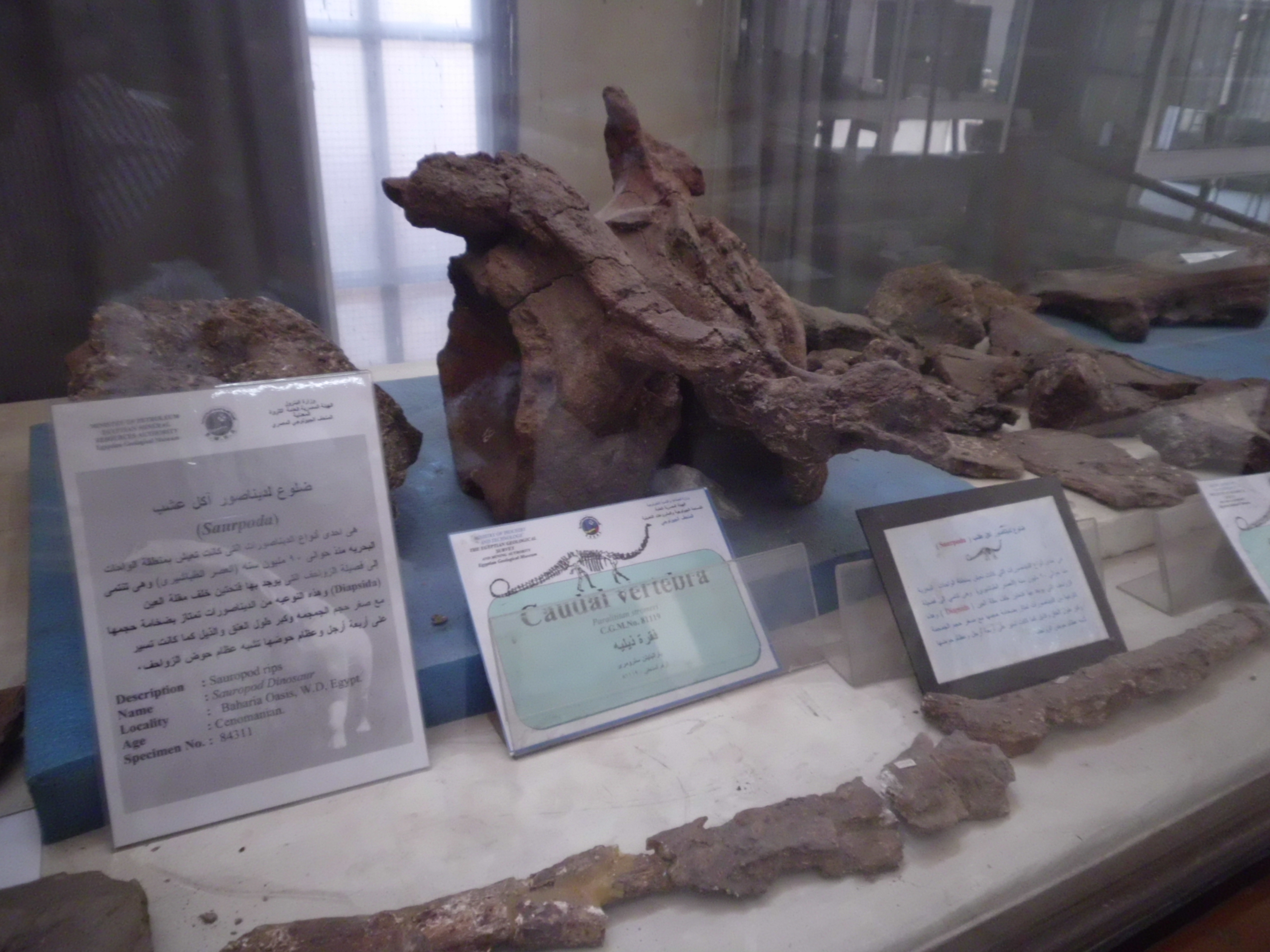
Caudal vertebrae on display at the Egyptian Geological Museum

Paralititan's humerus is huge at 1.69 meters (5.5 feet) in length, with greatly expanded upper and lower ends. The upper region of the proximal surface of the humerus bears a muscular depression (an area for muscle attachment). The deltopectoral crest is large, stretching for more than 53% of the length of the humerus. On the proximal surface of the distal end of the humerus is a large fossa (depression) that is bordered by two large ridges, a medial and a lateral one. The lateral ridge in particular expands into a tuberosity relatively close to the upper margin of the humerus, as in Saltasaurus and Lirainosaurus, whereas the medial ridge, one unique to Paralititan, is relatively shorter and does not develop into a tuberosity. At the condyles (area where the humerus articulates with the ulna and radius) at the distal end of the humerus are supracondylar ridges. These ridges extend over 1/3rd of the humerus' length and flank a large olecranon fossa (area of the humerus that the ulna's olecranon process articulates), like in other titanosaurs. The metacarpal known from Paralititan has a rectangular, flattened surface indicative phalangeal reduction or absence on this digit. A second sauropod, Aegyptosaurus, is known from the Bahariya Formation. Paralititan differs from Aegyptosaurus in its larger size, possibly in not having pleurocoels in its front tail vertebrae, and in possessing a relatively longer deltopectoral crest on its humerus.

== Classification ==
Paralititan belonged to the group Lithostrotia, a group of sauropods that existed during the Cretaceous period in every continent except for Australia. This group includes a wide array of sauropods, including some of the largest dinosaurs known to ever live such as Argentinosaurus, Patagotitan, and Puertasaurus. Notocolossus and Alamosaurus were comparable in size to Paralititan, being 24 m (79 ft) and 26 metres (85 ft) long respectively. The position of Paralititan within Lithostrotia has changed; Smith and colleagues (2001) considered Paralititan a member of Titanosauridae, a now unused clade name, alongside Saltasaurus, Malawisaurus, Opisthocoelicaudia, Epachthosaurus, and Alamosaurus. However, many later studies did not analyze the phylogenetic placement of Paralititan, likely on account of its fragmentary nature. In studies by American paleontologist Kristina Curry Rogers (2005) and British paleontologists Philip D. Mannion and Paul Upchurch (2011), Paralititan was recovered as a basal titanosaurian in their phylogenetic analyses. Paralititan was also found to be distantly related to other African taxa like Malawisaurus and Rukwatitan, making the relationships of Paralititan relative to those of other African titanosaurs convoluted.

In a 2022 phylogenetic analysis, Spanish paleontologist Bernat Villa and colleagues recovered Paralititan in the family Saltasauridae, a group of Asian, African, European, North American, and South American lithostrotian titanosaurs that lived during the Cretaceous period. Some saltasaurids like Saltasaurus had dorsal osteoderms on their backs, though other saltasaurids like Paralititan have not been discovered with these osteoderms. Based on the study, Paralititan was a member of Saltasaurinae, a subfamily that is divided in two clades: Saltasaurini, endemic to South America, and an Afro-European clade formed by Paralititan and Abditosaurus. The clade containing both the Afro-European and South American clades is backed by two synapomorphies: divided humeral distal condyles and caudal centra that are wider than tall. Both of these features are found in Paralititan.

Below is a cladogram by Villa et al. (2022), from the description of the European saltasaurine Abditosaurus.

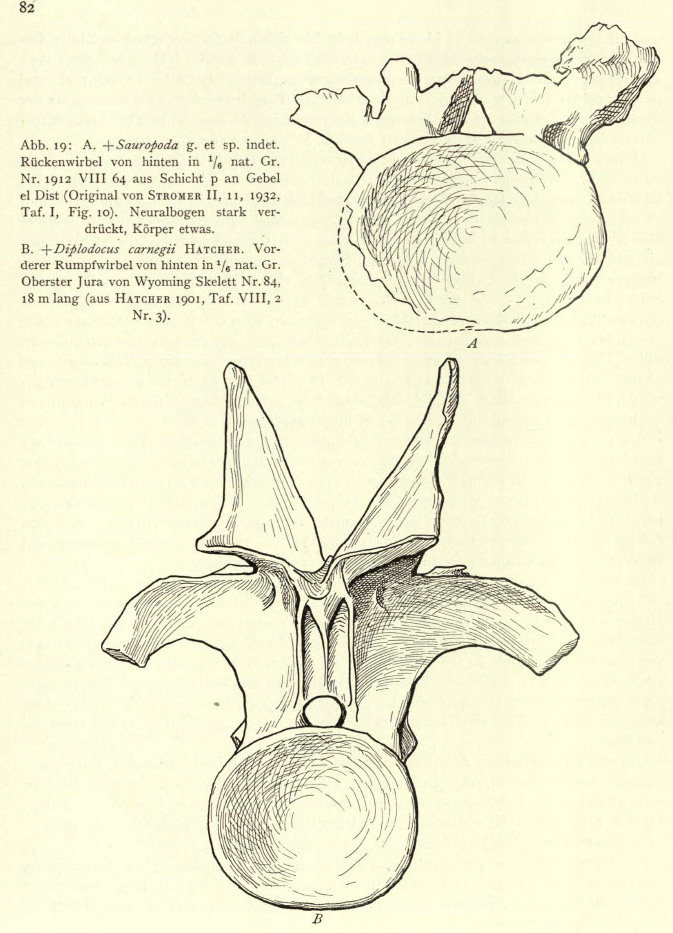
Dorsal vertebra (above; SNSB-BSPG 1912V11164) assigned to Paralititan compared to that of Diplodocus (below)

- Saltasauridae
  - Lognkosauria
  - - Opisthocoelicaudiinae
      - - Mansourasaurus
        - Paludititan
      - - - Ampelosaurus
          - - Lirainosaurus
            - Opisthocoelicaudia
        - - Lohuecotitan
          - - Pellegrinisaurus
            - - Dreadnoughtus
              - - Alamosaurus
                - Baurutitan
    - Saltasaurinae
      - - Maxakalisaurus
        - - Paralititan
          - Abditosaurus
      - Saltasaurini
        - Neuquensaurus
        - Saltasaurus

== Palaeoenvironment and taphonomy ==
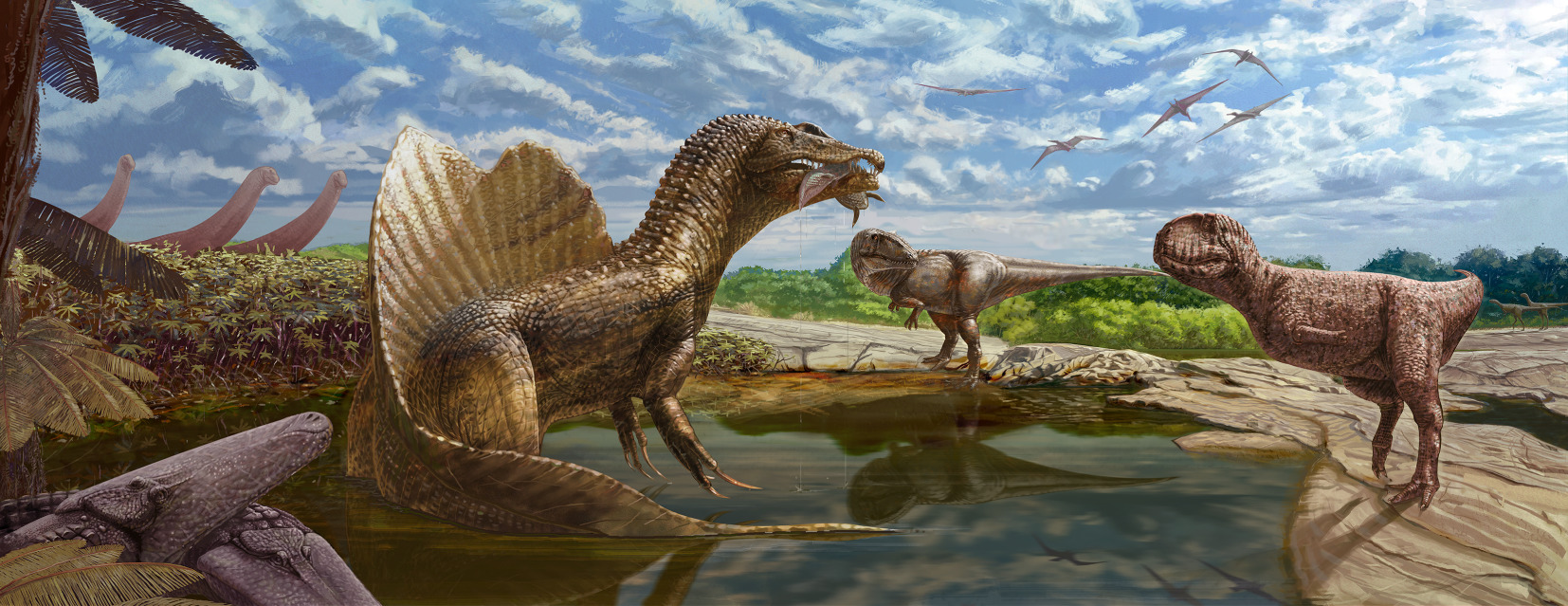
Restoration of Paralititan (background, left) with contemporaneous animals of the Bahariya Formation

The autochthonous (a fossil deposit with remains that were not moved by biological or physical processes), associated holotype skeleton was preserved in tidal flat deposits with a mangrove vegetation of seed ferns, Weichselia reticulata, according to the occurrence of plant fossils and root marks in the sediments. The layer in which the Paralititan fossils were found indicates a shallow water environment. Additionally, the associated nature of the holotype and presence of a shallow, vegetated tidal flat indicates that the skeleton was autochthonous. An isolated tooth assigned to Carcharodontosaurus, a genus formerly thought to be present in the Bahariya Formation but now assigned to Tameryraptor, was found associated with the skeleton. Smith and colleagues (2001) stated that this is evidence of the holotype being scavenged by a carnivorous dinosaur as the tooth is larger than the clasts that could be transported in the tidal flat channels, indicating that the Carcharodontosaurus individual moved towards the site and shed its tooth there.

This mangrove system bordered the Tethys Sea, which transformed the region into a mangrove-dominated coastal environment filled with vast tidal flats and waterways. Paralititan is the first dinosaur demonstrated to have inhabited a mangrove habitat. Alongside the earlier named Aegyptosaurus, Paralititan is one of the few sauropods known from the Bahariya Formation, alongside the coeval theropods Bahariasaurus, Tameryraptor, and Spinosaurus, the latter being also known from the Kem Kem beds. A Paralititan-sized titanosaur is known from the Kem Kem Beds, however it is only represented by fragmentary remains. The faunal composition of both the Bahariya Formation and the Kem Kem Beds were thought to be similar in the past, but the describers of Tameryraptor suggested that such superficial comparisons require further examination. Contemporary abelisaurid dinosaurs from the Bahariya Formation were also terrestrial carnivores, preying on other terrestrial fauna. A diverse fauna of aquatic animals is known from the Bahariya Formation. Underwater life diversity exploded during this period in the mangroves of North Africa, with turtles represented by the pleurodian Apertotemporalis, large bony fish like Mawsonia and Paranogmius, sawskates Onchopristis and Schizorhiza, sharks like Squalicorax and Cretolamna, and a broad selection of invertebrates. Additionally, several crocodylomorphs like the stomatosuchid Stomatosuchus and the eunotosuchian Libycosuchus are known from the formation.
