= Albert-Félix de Lapparent =

Albert-Félix de Lapparent (French pronunciation: [albɛʁ feliks də lapaʁɑ̃]; 1905–1975) was a French palaeontologist. He was also a Sulpician priest. He undertook a number of fossil-hunting explorations in the Sahara desert. He contributed to knowledge about dinosaurs and other prehistoric creatures. In 1986, José Bonaparte named the dinosaur Lapparentosaurus in his honour.

Dinosaurs named by Lapparent were Inosaurus tedreftensis (Lapparent, 1960) and Lusitanosaurus liassicus (Lapparent and Zbyszewski, 1957).

New species of known genera are also credited to him. In alphabetical order, they are: Apatosaurus alenquerensis (Lapparent and Zbyszewski, 1957), Astrodon pusillus (Lapparent and Zbyszewski, 1957), Brachiosaurus atalaiensis (Lapparent and Zbyszewski, 1957), Brachiosaurus nougaredi (Lapparent, 1960), Cetiosaurus mogrebiensis (Lapparent, 1955), Elaphrosaurus gautieri (Lapparent, 1960), Elaphrosaurus iguidiensis (Lapparent, 1960), Megalosaurus pombali (Lapparent and Zbyszewski, 1957) and Rebbachisaurus tamesnensis (Lapparent, 1960).

The giant crocodile Sarcosuchus was also discovered by him, in 1964.
