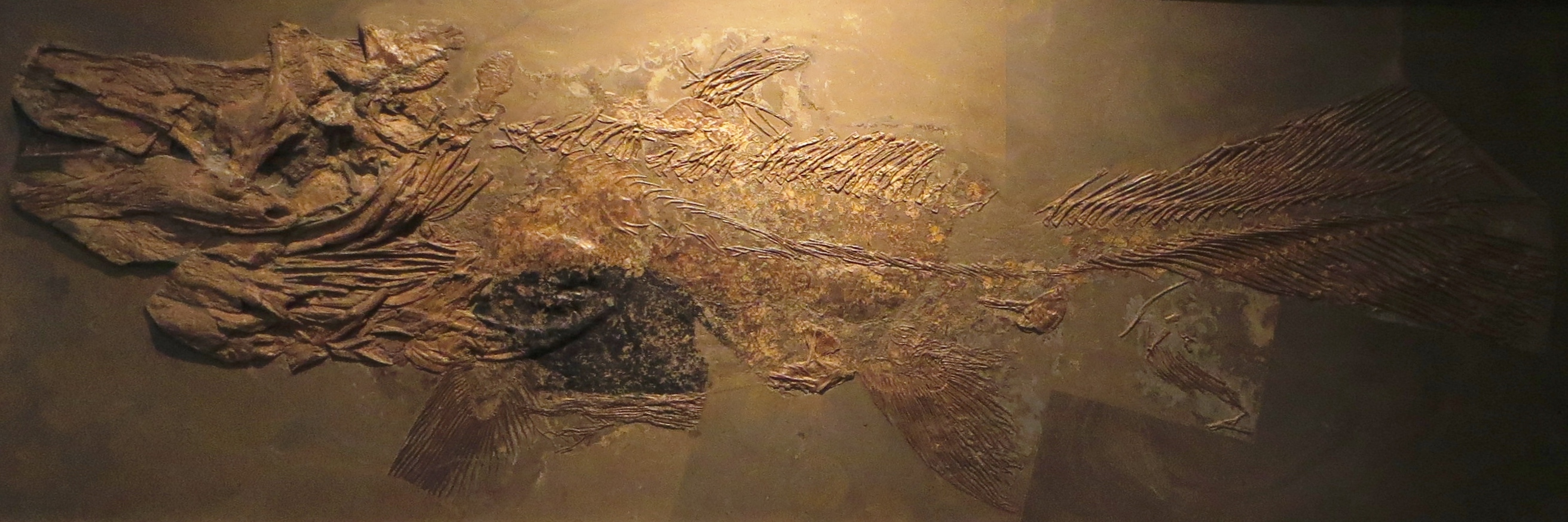
- Fossil of Trachymetopon
- Skull diagram

Scientific classification
- Kingdom: Animalia
- Phylum: Chordata
- Class: Actinistia
- Order: Coelacanthiformes
- Suborder: Latimerioidei
- Family: †Mawsoniidae
- Genus: †Trachymetopon; Hennig, 1951

Species
- Trachymetopon liasicum Hennig, 1951

= Trachymetopon =

Trachymetopon Temporal range: Sinemurian-Callovian ~199–163.5 Ma Possible Kimmeridgian record

Extinct genus of fishes

Trachymetopon is an extinct genus of coelacanth from the Jurassic of Europe. Fossils have been found in the Early Jurassic Posidonia Shale of Germany the Middle Jurassic Marnes de Dives of France, and probably the Late Jurassic Kimmeridge Clay of England. Only one species has been named, Trachymetopon liassicum, described by Hennig in 1951 from an almost complete specimen found in the Lower Toarcian of Ohmden in Baden-Württemberg. Another specimen is known from the same site, and two older specimens come from the Sinemurian of Holzmaden. The holotype of this species is 1.6 metres (5 ft 3.0 in) in length. A giant specimen of an undetermined species was found at the Middle Jurassic (Late Callovian) Falaises des Vaches Noires of Normandy. This specimen, composed of a 53 centimetres (21 in) long palatoquadrate, belongs to an individual 4 metres (13.1 ft) in length. A basisphenoid found in a museum in Switzerland that likely originates from the same locality probably belonged to an individual around 5 metres (16.4 ft) long, making Trachymetopon the largest of all coelacanths alongside Mawsonia. A study published in 2015 revealed that this coelacanth belongs to the Mawsoniidae. Trachymetopon is one of the few known mawsoniids to have been exclusively marine (with an indeterminate form from the Triassic of France), while most of the other members of the group have lived in fresh and brackish waters.

== Phylogeny ==
A phylogenetic analysis of the mawsoniids published in 2020 found a polytomy grouping together Trachymetopon and the Cretaceous genera "Lualabaea", Axelrodichthys, and Mawsonia. The genus "Lualabaea" could be congeneric with Axelrodichthys.

- - Outgroup
  - - - Diplurus
      - - - Parnaibaia
          - - - Chinlea
              - - - Trachymetopon liassicum
                  - "Mawsonia" lavocati
                  - Mawsonia
                  - Axelrodichthys + "Lualabaea"

== See also ==
- Sarcopterygii
- List of sarcopterygians
- List of prehistoric bony fish
