= Kem Kem Group =

Geological group in eastern Morocco

- Stratigraphic range: Cenomanian; ~100–94 Ma
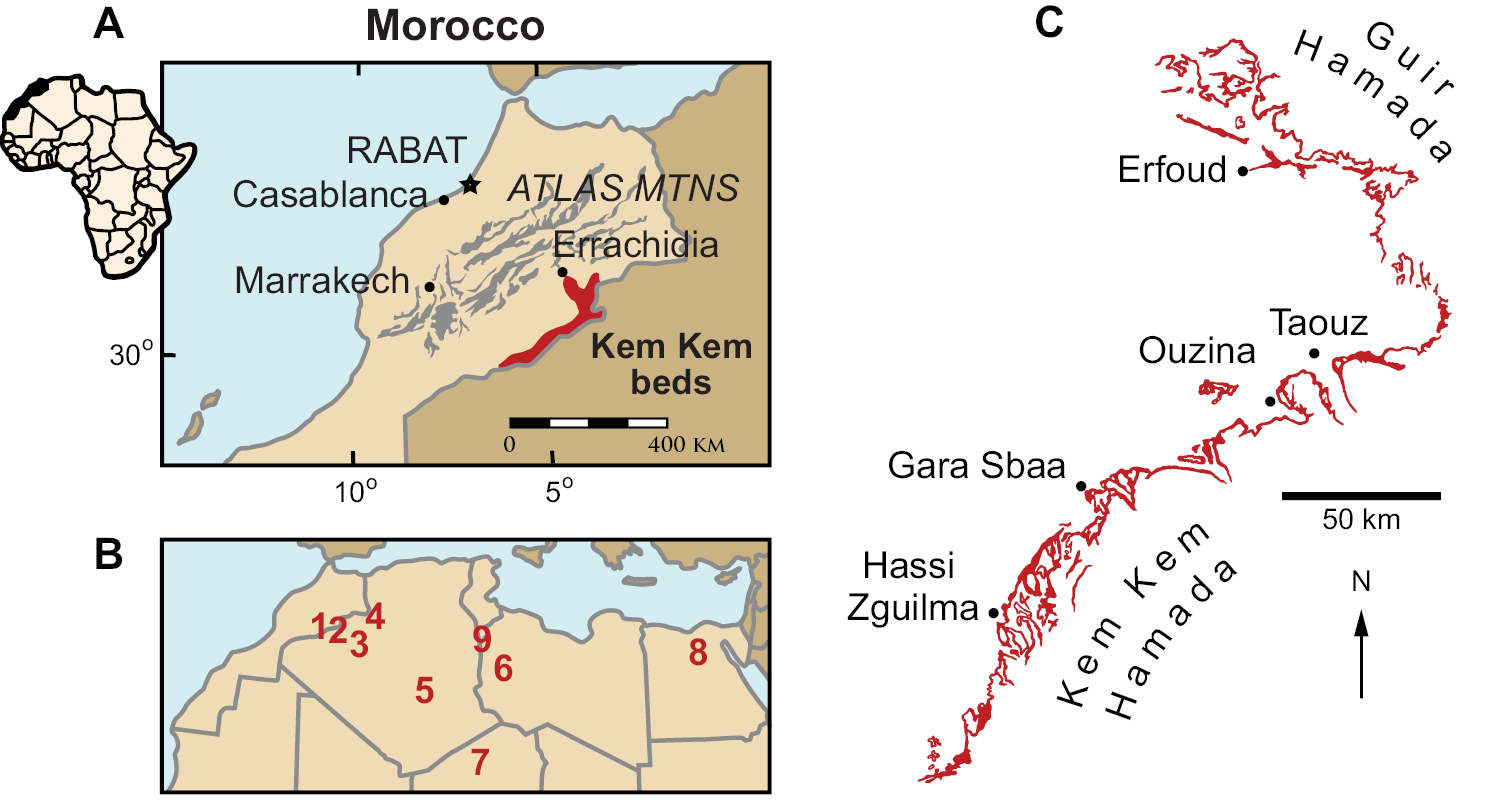
- Type: Geological group
- Sub-units: Douira Formation, Gara Sbaa Formation
- Underlies: Cenomanian-Turonian limestone platform (Akrabou Formation)

Lithology
- Primary: Sandstone

Location
- Coordinates: 32°50′N 4°50′W
- Approximate paleocoordinates: 18.8°N 4.1°W
- Region: Er Rachidia, Tafilalt
- Country: Morocco
- Extent: central and eastern Morocco north and south of the Pre-African Trough
- Kem Kem Group (Morocco)

The Kem Kem Group (commonly known as the Kem Kem beds) is a geological group in the Kem Kem region of eastern Morocco, whose strata date back to the Cenomanian stage of the Late Cretaceous.

Dinosaur remains are among the fossils that have been recovered from the group. Recent fossil evidence in the form of isolated large abelisaurid bones and comparisons with other similarly aged deposits elsewhere in Africa indicates that the fauna of the Kem Kem Group (specifically in regard to the numerous predatory theropod dinosaurs) may have been mixed together due to the harsh and changing geology of the region, when in reality they would likely have preferred separate habitats and likely would have been separated by millions of years.

== Stratigraphy and paleoenvironment ==
Although preserving a freshwater habitat located near a river delta (with some estuarine influence that increased over time as the sea level rose), the Kem Kem deposits were quickly submerged by the sea during the Cenomanian-Turonian boundary event, and are thus overlaid by the marine deposits of the younger latest Cenomanian and early-mid Turonian-aged Akrabou Formation, which was formerly also considered a member of the Kem Kem Group, but has been differentiated from it in more recent studies due to their differing paleoenvironments.

Its strata are subdivided into two geological formations, with the lower Ifezouane Formation and the upper Aoufous Formation used for the strata on the eastern side of the Atlas Mountains (Tinghir), with the Gara Sbaa Formation and Douira Formation used in the southern Tafilalt region. It is exposed on an escarpment along the Algeria–Morocco border. According to Ibrahim, the Lower Kem Kem consists of the Ifezouane & Gara Sbaa Formations, while the Upper Kem Kem is consisted of The Douira & Aufous Formations.

The unit unconformably overlies Paleozoic marine units of Cambrian, Silurian and Devonian ages and is itself capped by limestone platform rock of Cenomanian-Turonian age. It primarily consists of freshwater and estuarine deltaic deposits. The lower Gara Sbaa Formation primarily consists of fine and medium grained sandstone, while the Douira Formation consists of fining-upward, coarse-to-fine grained sandstones intercalated with siltstones, variegated mudstones, and occasional thin gypsiferous evaporites.

The Kem Kem is interpreted as being deposited in a tropical semi-arid climate, with brief monsoon rains. It is believed to Span the Lower to Middle Cenomanian, a span of roughly 100-95 mya.

== Vertebrate paleofauna ==
=== Cartilaginous fish ===
Cartilaginous fish
Genus	Species	Location	Stratigraphic position	Material	Notes	Images
Acrodontidae indet.	Indeterminate				Members of Hybodontoidea	
Bahariyodon	B. bartheli				A member of Hybodontoidea	
Cenocarcharias	C. tenuiplicatus			One tooth	A member of the family Cretoxyrhinidae	
Distobatus	D. nutiae				A member of Hybodontoidea	
Haimirichia	H. amonensis			One tooth	A mackerel shark	
Marckgrafia	M. lybica			13 teeth	A member of Batoidea	
Onchopristis	O. numida			Various isolated, and some articulated remains	A rajiform sawskate	Onchopristis rostrum and teeth fossils
Peyeria	P. libyca			Three teeth	A sawskate. Might be a junior synonym of Onchopristis numida.	
Tribodus	T. sp.				A member of Hybodontoidea	

=== Ray-finned fish ===
Ray-finned fish
Genus	Species	Location	Stratigraphic position	Material	Notes	Images
Adrianaichthys	A. pankowskii			Isolated scales and two skulls	A member of Lepisosteiformes. Originally described as a species of Lepidotes, but subsequently transferred to a separate genus.	Life restoration of Aidachar Life restoration of Bawitius Life restoration of Calamopleurus Life restoration of Concavotectum Serenoichthys
Afrocascudo	A. saharaensis				A neopterygiian fish, either an ancient loricariid catfish or a juvenile obaichthyid lepisosteiform.	Life restoration of Aidachar Life restoration of Bawitius Life restoration of Calamopleurus Life restoration of Concavotectum Serenoichthys
Agassizilia	A. erfoudina				Possibly a member of the family Pycnodontidae.	Life restoration of Aidachar Life restoration of Bawitius Life restoration of Calamopleurus Life restoration of Concavotectum Serenoichthys
Agoultichthys	A. chattertoni				A long-bodied member of Actinopterygii of uncertain phylogenetic placement. Might be a member of the family Macrosemiidae or Ophiopsiellidae.	Life restoration of Aidachar Life restoration of Bawitius Life restoration of Calamopleurus Life restoration of Concavotectum Serenoichthys
Aidachar	A. pankowskii		Ifezouane Formation	Isolated braincase and teeth	A member of Ichthyodectiformes	Life restoration of Aidachar Life restoration of Bawitius Life restoration of Calamopleurus Life restoration of Concavotectum Serenoichthys
Bartschichthys	B. sp.			Isolated pinnulae (spines that support each dorsal finlet)	A cladistian	Life restoration of Aidachar Life restoration of Bawitius Life restoration of Calamopleurus Life restoration of Concavotectum Serenoichthys
Bawitius	cf. B. sp.			Isolated scales and jaw fragments	A cladistian	Life restoration of Aidachar Life restoration of Bawitius Life restoration of Calamopleurus Life restoration of Concavotectum Serenoichthys
Calamopleurus	C. africanus			A partial skull	A member of Amiiformes	Life restoration of Aidachar Life restoration of Bawitius Life restoration of Calamopleurus Life restoration of Concavotectum Serenoichthys
Concavotectum	C. moroccensis	Tizi Moumrad, Chaaft, and Douira		Isolated braincases, post cranial remains	A member of Tselfatiiformes	Life restoration of Aidachar Life restoration of Bawitius Life restoration of Calamopleurus Life restoration of Concavotectum Serenoichthys
Dentilepisosteus	D. kemkemensis				A member of Lepisosteiformes	Life restoration of Aidachar Life restoration of Bawitius Life restoration of Calamopleurus Life restoration of Concavotectum Serenoichthys
Diplomystus	D. sp.				A deep-bodied teleost belonging to the group Clupeomorpha	Life restoration of Aidachar Life restoration of Bawitius Life restoration of Calamopleurus Life restoration of Concavotectum Serenoichthys
Diplospondichthys	D. moreaui				A member of Actinopterygii of uncertain phylogenetic placement, possibly a teleost	Life restoration of Aidachar Life restoration of Bawitius Life restoration of Calamopleurus Life restoration of Concavotectum Serenoichthys
Erfoudichthys	E. rosae			Isolated skull	A small-bodied teleost of unknown affinity	Life restoration of Aidachar Life restoration of Bawitius Life restoration of Calamopleurus Life restoration of Concavotectum Serenoichthys
Neoproscinetes	N. africanus				A member of the family Pycnodontidae	Life restoration of Aidachar Life restoration of Bawitius Life restoration of Calamopleurus Life restoration of Concavotectum Serenoichthys
Obaichthys	O. africanus		Ifezouane Formation	Isolated scales	A member of Lepisosteiformes	Life restoration of Aidachar Life restoration of Bawitius Life restoration of Calamopleurus Life restoration of Concavotectum Serenoichthys
Oniichthys	O. falipoui			Near complete skeleton including skull	A member of Lepisosteiformes	Life restoration of Aidachar Life restoration of Bawitius Life restoration of Calamopleurus Life restoration of Concavotectum Serenoichthys
Palaeonotopterus	P. greenwoodi				A member of Osteoglossomorpha	Life restoration of Aidachar Life restoration of Bawitius Life restoration of Calamopleurus Life restoration of Concavotectum Serenoichthys
Serenoichthys	S. kemkemensis			Several articulated skeletons	A small cladistian	Life restoration of Aidachar Life restoration of Bawitius Life restoration of Calamopleurus Life restoration of Concavotectum Serenoichthys
Spinocaudichthys	S. oumtkoutensis				An elongate freshwater acanthomorph	Life restoration of Aidachar Life restoration of Bawitius Life restoration of Calamopleurus Life restoration of Concavotectum Serenoichthys
Stromerichthys	S. aethiopicus					Life restoration of Aidachar Life restoration of Bawitius Life restoration of Calamopleurus Life restoration of Concavotectum Serenoichthys
Sudania	S. sp.			An isolated pinnula	A cladistian	Life restoration of Aidachar Life restoration of Bawitius Life restoration of Calamopleurus Life restoration of Concavotectum Serenoichthys

=== Lobe-finned fish ===
Lobe-finned fish
Genus	Species	Location	Material	Notes	Images
Arganodus	A. tiguidiensis			A lungfish	Life restoration of Axelrodichthys The Queensland Lungfish, the only living member of Neoceratodus
Axelrodichthys	A.? lavocati			A mawsoniid coelacanth; this species was previously assigned to Mawsonia, and its generic assignment is still not certain	Life restoration of Axelrodichthys The Queensland Lungfish, the only living member of Neoceratodus
Neoceratodus	N. africanus		Isolated tooth plates	A lungfish	Life restoration of Axelrodichthys The Queensland Lungfish, the only living member of Neoceratodus

=== Amphibians ===
Amphibians
Genus	Species	Location	Stratigraphic position	Material	Notes	Images
Anura indet.	Indeterminate		Douira Formation	Incomplete left ilium		
Cretadhefdaa	C. taouzensis		Douira Formation	Posterior portion of the skull, incomplete squamosal, incomplete maxilla, three incomplete presacral vertebrae, one incomplete sacral vertebra	A neobatrachian frog with possible hyloid affinities.	
cf. Kababisha	Indeterminate				A salamander belonging to the family Sirenidae	
?Neobatrachia indet.	Indeterminate		Douira Formation	Incomplete humerus	A frog, possibly a member of Ranoidea.	
Oumtkoutia	O. anae				A frog belonging to the family Pipidae	

=== Lizards and snakes ===
Color key: Taxon / Reclassified taxon / Taxon falsely reported as present / Dubious taxon or junior synonym / Ichnotaxon / Ootaxon / Morphotaxon	Notes; Uncertain or tentative taxa are in small text; ~~crossed out~~ taxa are discredited.

Lizards and snakes reported from the Continental Red Beds
Genus	Species	Location	Stratigraphic position	Material	Notes	Images
Bicuspidon	B. hogreli				A polyglyphanodontid lizard.	
Jeddaherdan	J. aleadonta			Partial mandible with teeth.	An iguanian belonging to the group Acrodonta, possibly a relative of the uromastycine agamids. Argued by Vullo et al. (2022) to actually come from Quaternary beds, and to be based on a fossil material of a member of the genus Uromastyx.	
Lapparentophis	L. ragei			Two isolated trunk vertebrae	An early snake.	
Madtsoiidae indet.	Indeterminate			Vertebrae	An early snake.	
?Nigerophiidae indet.	Indeterminate			Dorsal vertebrae	An early snake.	
Norisophis	N. begaa			One posterior and two mid-trunk vertebrae	A stem-snake.	
Norisophis	Indeterminate			A mid-trunk vertebra	A stem-snake.	
Simoliophis	cf. S. libycus			Vertebrae	An early snake.	

=== Plesiosaurs ===
Plesiosaurs
Genus	Species	Location	Stratigraphic position	Material	Notes	Images
Leptocleididae cf. Leptocleidus	indeterminate			Isolated teeth, a humerus and vertebrae		Life restoration of Leptocleidus

=== Turtles ===
Turtles reported from the Continental Red Beds
Genus	Species	Location	Stratigraphic position	Material	Notes	Images
Dirqadim	D. schaefferi				A Euraxemydid	Skull of Galianemys
Galianemys	G. emringeri				A Cearachelyin	Skull of Galianemys
Galianemys	G. whitei			Skull material		Skull of Galianemys
Hamadachelys	H. escuilliei			Skull and mandible	A basal Podocnemidoid	Skull of Galianemys

=== Crocodylomorphs ===
Crocodylomorphs reported from the Continental Red Beds
Genus	Species	Location	Stratigraphic position	Material	Notes	Images
Aegisuchus	A. witmeri			"Partial braincase of a large individual with skull roof, temporal, and occipital regions."	An aegyptosuchid that may be a synonym of Laganosuchus.	Aegisuchus Antaeusuchus Araripesuchus Elosuchus cherifiensis Hamadasuchus rebouli Laganosuchus
Antaeusuchus	A. taouzensis	Near Jebel Beg'aa, Taouz		Paired mandibles and a partial right mandible	A peirosaurid.	Aegisuchus Antaeusuchus Araripesuchus Elosuchus cherifiensis Hamadasuchus rebouli Laganosuchus
Araripesuchus	A. rattoides		Douira Formation			Aegisuchus Antaeusuchus Araripesuchus Elosuchus cherifiensis Hamadasuchus rebouli Laganosuchus
Elosuchus	E. cherifiensis		Gara Sbaa Formation; Douira Formation		A pholidosaurid. The material may represent two different species.	Aegisuchus Antaeusuchus Araripesuchus Elosuchus cherifiensis Hamadasuchus rebouli Laganosuchus
Hamadasuchus	H. rebouli		Gara Sbaa Formation; Douira Formation		A peirosaurid.	Aegisuchus Antaeusuchus Araripesuchus Elosuchus cherifiensis Hamadasuchus rebouli Laganosuchus
Kemkemia	K. auditorei	Errachidia Province, Morocco		Known from an isolated caudal vertebra.	Initially thought to be a neotheropod, but subsequently discovered to be an indeterminate crocodyliform.	Aegisuchus Antaeusuchus Araripesuchus Elosuchus cherifiensis Hamadasuchus rebouli Laganosuchus
Laganosuchus	L. maghrebensis				A stomatosuchid.	Aegisuchus Antaeusuchus Araripesuchus Elosuchus cherifiensis Hamadasuchus rebouli Laganosuchus
Lavocatchampsa	L. sigogneaurusselae			Anterior portion of a rostrum with mandible, with an almost complete dentition	A candidodontid notosuchian.	Aegisuchus Antaeusuchus Araripesuchus Elosuchus cherifiensis Hamadasuchus rebouli Laganosuchus
Notosuchia indet.	Indeterminate		Douira Formation	Teeth	Indeterminate notosuchians. Represent by distinct multicuspid teeth,similar to Adamantinasuchus & Yacarerani. Suggestive of a herbivorous diet.	Aegisuchus Antaeusuchus Araripesuchus Elosuchus cherifiensis Hamadasuchus rebouli Laganosuchus
cf. Sarcosuchus	Indeterminate			Teeth and Osteoderms	Possible remains of Sarcosuchus. Additional Cenomanian occurrences known from Algeria.	Aegisuchus Antaeusuchus Araripesuchus Elosuchus cherifiensis Hamadasuchus rebouli Laganosuchus

=== Dinosaurs ===
Indeterminate lithostrotian remains once misattributed to the Titanosauridae are present in the province of Ksar-es-Souk, Morocco.

Color key: Taxon / Reclassified taxon / Taxon falsely reported as present / Dubious taxon or junior synonym / Ichnotaxon / Ootaxon / Morphotaxon	Notes; Uncertain or tentative taxa are in small text; ~~crossed out~~ taxa are discredited.

==== Ornithischians ====
Ornithischians reported from the Continental Red Beds
Genus	Species	Location	Stratigraphic position	Material	Notes	Images
Thyreophora	Indeterminate		Douira Formation	An isolated tooth.	An indeterminate thyreophoran. Possibly an ankylosaur.	
Ornithopoda	Indeterminate		Douira Formation	A large, clover-shaped, three-toed footprint. A smaller print is known as well.	Comparable in size and shape to tracks typically attributed to Iguanodon. Smaller possible ornithopod track is known as well.	

==== Sauropods ====
Sauropods reported from the Continental Red Beds
Genus	Species	Location	Stratigraphic position	Material	Notes	Images
Rebbachisaurus	R. garasbae	Ksar-es-Souk province, Morocco.	Gara Sbaa Formation		A rebbachisaurid.	Rebbachisaurus garasbae
Somphospondyli	Indeterminate			Anterior dorsal vertebra, partial right ischium	The vertebra might belong to a basal titanosaurian, possibly distinct from Aegyptosaurus and Paralititan. The ischium is not identifiable beyond Somphospondyli; it preserves numerous grooves and pits which might be feeding traces left by a very large non-avian theropod.	Rebbachisaurus garasbae
Titanosauria	Indeterminate		Ifezouane Formation; Douira Formation	Isolated teeth, caudal vertebrae, a partial humerus, a tarsal bone and proximal partial ulna.	Fossil material of one or more titanosaurian sauropods. Some fossils are indicative of large body size comparable to Paralititan stromeri. The largest specimens hail from the Douira Formation. An ulna from Doira has a width of 51 cm.	Rebbachisaurus garasbae
Rebbachisauridae Indet.	Indeterminate		Douira Formation	Teeth	Teeth referred to an indeterminate rebbachisaurid.	Rebbachisaurus garasbae

==== Theropods ====
Theropods reported from the Continental Red Beds
Genus	Species	Location	Stratigraphic position	Material	Notes	Images
Abelisauridae	Indeterminate			Isolated teeth. Partial right femur. Partial right maxilla. A cervical vertebra. Left maxilla.	Abelisaurid material belonging to one or two distinct taxa. Some of the material has been noted as similar to Rugops, but the diagnostic features in that genus are on the orbital bones;not preserved in the Kem Kem material. Preventing definitive referral.	Carcharodontosaurus saharicus Deltadromeus agilis Sigilmassasaurus Spinosaurus aegyptiacus
Carcharodontosaurus	C. saharicus	Ksar-es-Souk province, Morocco.	Douira Formation	Partial skull, including braincase, nasals, postorbitals, jugals, left lacrimal and right maxilla with most teeth.	A carcharodontosaurid theropod.	Carcharodontosaurus saharicus Deltadromeus agilis Sigilmassasaurus Spinosaurus aegyptiacus
Carcharodontosauridae	Indeterminate	Southeast of Taouz, Errachidia Province	Ifezouane Formation	partial maxilla and partial jugal	A carcharodontosaurid theropod different from C. saharicus	Carcharodontosaurus saharicus Deltadromeus agilis Sigilmassasaurus Spinosaurus aegyptiacus
Deltadromeus	D. agilis		Gara Sbaa Formation	"Partial skeleton, isolated limb elements."	A noasaurid ceratosaurian, May be synonymous with Bahariasaurus.	Carcharodontosaurus saharicus Deltadromeus agilis Sigilmassasaurus Spinosaurus aegyptiacus
Dromaeosauridae	Indeterminate			Isolated teeth.	Originally described as teeth of indeterminate dromaeosaurids. Hendrickx et al. (2024) reinterpreted this fossil material as teeth of abelisauroid theropods, including noasaurids and juvenile abelisaurids.	Carcharodontosaurus saharicus Deltadromeus agilis Sigilmassasaurus Spinosaurus aegyptiacus
cf. Elaphrosaurus	Indeterminate	Ksar-es-Souk province, Morocco.			Fossils previously referred to cf. Elaphrosaurus are actually indeterminate theropod remains.	Carcharodontosaurus saharicus Deltadromeus agilis Sigilmassasaurus Spinosaurus aegyptiacus
Noasauridae	Indeterminate			An anterior cervical vertebra Isolated teeth		Carcharodontosaurus saharicus Deltadromeus agilis Sigilmassasaurus Spinosaurus aegyptiacus
"Osteoporosia"	"O. gigantea"			A tooth and a possible neural arch from another specimen.	A theropod, possibly synonymous with Sauroniops.	Carcharodontosaurus saharicus Deltadromeus agilis Sigilmassasaurus Spinosaurus aegyptiacus
Saurischia	Indeterminate			An isolated cervical vertebra.	An indeterminate saurischian.	Carcharodontosaurus saharicus Deltadromeus agilis Sigilmassasaurus Spinosaurus aegyptiacus
Sauroniops	S. pachytholus		Ifezouane Formation	"An isolated and almost complete left frontal, and a possible tooth and neural arch from two other specimens."	A carcharodontosaurid thought to be distinct from Carcharodontosaurus, considered a nomen dubium by Kellerman et al.	Carcharodontosaurus saharicus Deltadromeus agilis Sigilmassasaurus Spinosaurus aegyptiacus
Sigilmassasaurus	S. brevicollis	Tafilalt Oasis region, Morocco.		A single neck vertebrae.	A controversial spinosaurid theropod.	Carcharodontosaurus saharicus Deltadromeus agilis Sigilmassasaurus Spinosaurus aegyptiacus
Spinosaurus	S. aegyptiacus	Ksar-es-Souk province, Morocco.	Douira Formation	Partial skeleton, including parts of the skull, neck, torso, and most of the tail and hind limbs. Numerous isolated bones.	A spinosaurid theropod.	Carcharodontosaurus saharicus Deltadromeus agilis Sigilmassasaurus Spinosaurus aegyptiacus
Averostra indet	Indeterminate			Tooth	Said to belong to either a non-abelisaurid ceratosaur or a megaraptoran.	Carcharodontosaurus saharicus Deltadromeus agilis Sigilmassasaurus Spinosaurus aegyptiacus
Abelisauroidea indet.	Indeterminate		Douira Formation	Pedal ungualLarge vertebrae	An indeterminate abelisauroid, known from a 7 cm long pedal ungual. Likely an abelisaurid or noasaurid. The vertebrae came from a giant abelisauroid.	Carcharodontosaurus saharicus Deltadromeus agilis Sigilmassasaurus Spinosaurus aegyptiacus

=== Pterosaurs ===
Pterosaurs of the Kem Kem Beds
Genus	Species	Location	Stratigraphic position	Abundance	Notes	Images
Afrotapejara	A. zouhri	Takmout	Ifezouane Formation	A fragment of bone interpreted as a fragment of anterior mandibular symphysis, and additional jaw fragments that pertain to the rostrum as well as indeterminate jaw fragments.	A tapejarid pterosaur. Originally believed to belong to either the family Thalassodromidae or an additional specimen of Alanqa saharica.	Afrotapejara zouhri Akharhynchus martilli Alanqa saharica Anhanguera Coloborhynchus Leptostomia Ornithocheirus
Akharhynchus	A. martilli	Tafilalt	Ifezouane Formation	A fragment of the anterior part of the premaxillae	A tropeognathine anhanguerian.	Afrotapejara zouhri Akharhynchus martilli Alanqa saharica Anhanguera Coloborhynchus Leptostomia Ornithocheirus
Alanqa	A. saharica		Ifezouane Formation	The holotype is a mandibular symphysis, of different parts of the jaw	A pterosaur of uncertain phylogenetic placement, probably an azhdarchid.	Afrotapejara zouhri Akharhynchus martilli Alanqa saharica Anhanguera Coloborhynchus Leptostomia Ornithocheirus
Anhanguera	A. cf. piscator		upper Ifezouane Formation	Partial mandibular symphysis		Afrotapejara zouhri Akharhynchus martilli Alanqa saharica Anhanguera Coloborhynchus Leptostomia Ornithocheirus
Apatorhamphus	A. gyrostega		Ifezouane Formation	Partial rostrum and mandible, with additional referred jaw fragments	A possible chaoyangopterid azhdarchoid pterosaur. Originally believed to be a possible pteranodontid, a possible dsungaripterid, a possible non-azhdarchid azhdarchoid or nyctosaurid, or a specimen of Alanqa saharica.	Afrotapejara zouhri Akharhynchus martilli Alanqa saharica Anhanguera Coloborhynchus Leptostomia Ornithocheirus
Azhdarchidae indet.	Indeterminate			Numerous middle cervical vertebrae and a femur.	Indicative of multiple taxa. Some of these vertebrae may pertain to Alanqa saharica.	Afrotapejara zouhri Akharhynchus martilli Alanqa saharica Anhanguera Coloborhynchus Leptostomia Ornithocheirus
Azhdarchoidea indet.	"Jaw morphotype A"			Two jaw fragments	Different from all named Kem Kem pterosaur taxa	Afrotapejara zouhri Akharhynchus martilli Alanqa saharica Anhanguera Coloborhynchus Leptostomia Ornithocheirus
Azhdarchoidea indet.	"Jaw morphotype B"			Partial mandible fragment	Probably had a similarly long jaw to Leptostomia	Afrotapejara zouhri Akharhynchus martilli Alanqa saharica Anhanguera Coloborhynchus Leptostomia Ornithocheirus
Azhdarchoidea indet.	"Jaw morphotype C"			Partial jaw fragments	May belong to Apatorhamphus or Xericeps	Afrotapejara zouhri Akharhynchus martilli Alanqa saharica Anhanguera Coloborhynchus Leptostomia Ornithocheirus
Azhdarchoidea indet.	Indeterminate			Five cervical vertebrae, a scapulocoracoid, two humeri, two ulnae, a metacarpal IV, and a tibiotarsus		Afrotapejara zouhri Akharhynchus martilli Alanqa saharica Anhanguera Coloborhynchus Leptostomia Ornithocheirus
Coloborhynchus	C. sp. A.	Hassi El Begaa		Premaxillae fragment	Possibly a specimen of Nicorhynchus fluviferox.	Afrotapejara zouhri Akharhynchus martilli Alanqa saharica Anhanguera Coloborhynchus Leptostomia Ornithocheirus
Leptostomia	L. begaaensis	Aferdou N' Chaft	upper Ifezouane Formation	Partial rostrum and partial mandibular synthesis	A small, long-beaked pterosaur, likely a member of Azhdarchoidea.	Afrotapejara zouhri Akharhynchus martilli Alanqa saharica Anhanguera Coloborhynchus Leptostomia Ornithocheirus
Nicorhynchus	N. fluviferox	Possibly Aferdou N'Chaft, Hassi El Begaa	Ifezouane Formation	An anterior portion of the rostrum.	Originally described as a species of Coloborhynchus but subsequently transferred to the genus Nicorhynchus.	Afrotapejara zouhri Akharhynchus martilli Alanqa saharica Anhanguera Coloborhynchus Leptostomia Ornithocheirus
Ornithocheirus	O. cf. simus.		upper Ifezouane Formation	Premaxillae fragment		Afrotapejara zouhri Akharhynchus martilli Alanqa saharica Anhanguera Coloborhynchus Leptostomia Ornithocheirus
Siroccopteryx	S. moroccensis			Anterior part of a rostrum	Classified by some authors as a species belonging to the genus Coloborhynchus.	Afrotapejara zouhri Akharhynchus martilli Alanqa saharica Anhanguera Coloborhynchus Leptostomia Ornithocheirus
Xericeps	X. curvirostra	Aferdou N'Chaft	Douira Formation	Mandibular symphysis and partial mandible	An indeterminate azhdarchoid, possibly a chaoyangopterid.	Afrotapejara zouhri Akharhynchus martilli Alanqa saharica Anhanguera Coloborhynchus Leptostomia Ornithocheirus

== Non-vertebrate paleofauna ==
The formation contains fossils of various insects, crustaceans, mollusks, and sea urchins. There are also traces of insect and priapulid activity.

Color key: Taxon / Reclassified taxon / Taxon falsely reported as present / Dubious taxon or junior synonym / Ichnotaxon / Ootaxon / Morphotaxon	Notes; Uncertain or tentative taxa are in small text; ~~crossed out~~ taxa are discredited.

=== Unicellular organisms ===
Genus	Species	Stratigraphic position	Material	Notes	Image
Eukaryote	Indeterminate	Douira Formation		Biofilm of bacteria or fungi.	Fossilized biofilm
Foraminifera		Douira Formation, Aoufous Formation	Foraminiferal tests	Various foraminifera.	

=== Mollusc ===
Gastropods and ammonites were found in the upper units.

Genus	Species	Stratigraphic position	Material	Notes
?Margaritifera		Ifezouane Formation	Shell	A freshwater bivalve.
Goumardonaia	G. radieri	Ifezouane Formation	Shell	A large (83 mm) freshwater bivalve.
Kemkemnaia	K. parvum	Ifezouane Formation	Shell with preserved gill structures.	A freshwater bivalve.
Monginella	M. cf. flattersensis	Ifezouane Formation	Shell	A freshwater bivalve.
Trigonioidoidea	Indeterminate	Ifezouane Formation	Shell	A freshwater bivalve.
Unio	U. radleyi	Ifezouane Formation	Shell	A freshwater bivalve.
Unionidae	Indeterminate	Ifezouane Formation	Shell	A freshwater bivalve.

=== Arthropods ===
Genus	Species	Stratigraphic position	Material	Notes	Image
Cretapenaeus	C. berberus			A freshwater prawn.	
Cubiculum	C. ornatus		Traces of bone borings on dead animals.	A terrestrial necrophagous insect.	Bone boring left by Cubiculum
Odonata	Indeterminate			A dragonfly larva.	
Ostracoda				Different types of ostracods.	
Troponoma	T. constricta		Feeding traces on a leaf.	A herbivorous insect.	

== Paleoflora ==
Color key: Taxon / Reclassified taxon / Taxon falsely reported as present / Dubious taxon or junior synonym / Ichnotaxon / Ootaxon / Morphotaxon	Notes; Uncertain or tentative taxa are in small text; ~~crossed out~~ taxa are discredited.

Based primarily on Krassilov & Bacchia.

Genus	Species	Stratigraphic position	Material	Notes	Image
Abietites	A. (Tritaenia) cf. linkii	Gara Sbaa Formation	Needles	A conifer.	
Barykovia	B. cf. tschuckotika	Gara Sbaa Formation	Leaf	A potentially fagalean angiosperm.	
Cocculophyllum	C. cf. fucinerve	Gara Sbaa Formation	Leaf	A climbing angiosperm.	
Coniopteris	C. cf. Dicksonia mamiyai	Gara Sbaa Formation	Leaflet	A fern.	
Dryophyllum	D. cf. subcretaceum	Gara Sbaa Formation	Leaf	A potentially fagalean angiosperm.	
Frenelopsis	F. cf. teixeirae	Gara Sbaa Formation	Shoot	A cheirolepidiacean conifer.	
Garasbahia	G. flexuosa	Gara Sbaa Formation	Branching shoot with leaves	A cabombacean angiosperm.	
Pseudotorellia	P. cf. ensiformis	Gara Sbaa Formation	Leaf	A ginkgoalean.	
Sulcatocladus	S. cf. robustus	Gara Sbaa Formation	Shoot	A conifer.	
Weichselia	W. reticulata	Gara Sbaa Formation	Shoot	A tree fern.	
Welwitschiophyllum	W. sp.	Gara Sbaa Formation	Leaf	A possible welwitschialean.	

== See also ==
- Aoufous Formation, which lies within the Kem Kem Beds
- List of dinosaur-bearing rock formations
