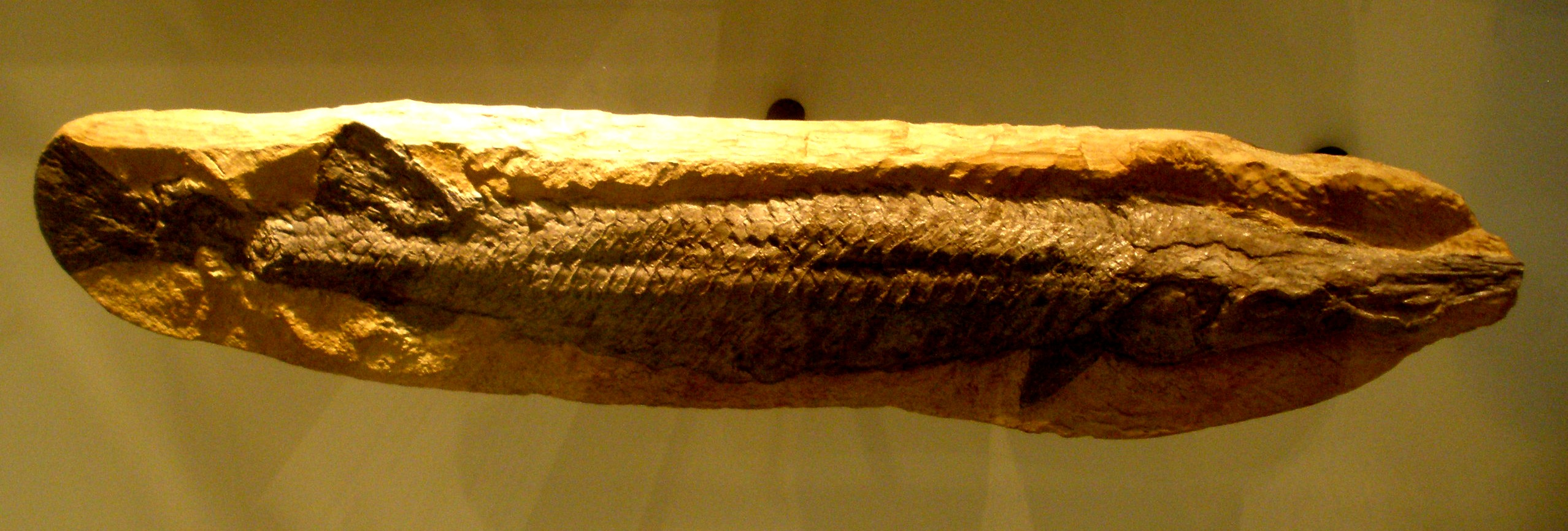
- Fossil of Obaichthys decoratus

Scientific classification
- Kingdom: Animalia
- Phylum: Chordata
- Class: Actinopterygii
- Clade: Ginglymodi
- Order: Lepisosteiformes
- Superfamily: Lepisosteoidea
- Family: †Obaichthyidae; Grande, 2010

Genera
- †Obaichthys (Type); †Dentilepisosteus; †Afrocascudo?

= Obaichthyidae =

Obaichthyidae Temporal range: Aptian–Cenomanian

Extinct family of ray-finned fishes

Obaichthyidae (also known as "spiny gars" or "spike gars") is an extinct family of ginglymodian ray-finned fish that lived in what is now Africa, South America, and southern Europe during the Upper Cretaceous period (Aptian–Cenomanian ages). They were close relatives of the modern gars of the family Lepisosteidae, with the two groups making up the superfamily Lepisosteoidea. Though obaichthyids are generally similar to their extant relatives, they possessed a mobile maxilla along with a large posterior spine on their scales. The specializations of the skull seen in members of the family suggest that the fish were most likely feeding in a similar style to that seen in syngnathiforms, especially those specialized for pivot feeding. Though they are mostly found in fresh and brackish water deposits, obaichthyids also had a tolerance to saltwater similar to modern gars.

== History ==
Even before these genera were placed into a single family, Obaichthys had been considered to be a sister to the rest of gars. The family was erected in 2010 by Lance Grande to include the genera Dentilepisosteus and Obaichthys. Afrocascudo, initially described as the earliest known armored catfish, might represent a juvenile obaichthyid, possibly a junior synonym of Obaichthys, though this has been disputed based on the complete ossification of the bones indicating full maturity and the absence of important holostean characters.

== Anatomy ==
=== Skull ===
Just like gars today, the skull of obaichthyids were extremely long and are largely made up of the premaxilla, with the length to width ratio of the snout being similar to Lepisosteus. Unlike the skulls of modern relatives, members of the family have an inter-operculum; this bone was ancestrally present in gars as seen in genera like Araripelepidotes. Some members, like Obaichthys, have a large number of ganoid spines ornamenting the skull in contrast to other gars. One of the most notable features of the skull of obaichthyids in comparison to modern gars is the presence of a mobile maxilla. This bone is the largest element of the upper jaw and has a single row of short teeth. Along with this, members of this family lack the lacrimo-maxillary series that is so prevalent in the modern gars. Their lower jaw is made up of a reduced lower jaw which produces a prominent "overbite" with teeth concentrated at the tip and a very small gape. Unlike those seen in the extant gars, the teeth of obaichthyids lack plicidentine, a structure suggested to be connected to the feeding style of the modern members. These differences in the feeding apparatus of obaichthyids suggests a different style of feeding than their modern relatives.

=== Postcrania ===
The overall body shape of obaichthyids is extremely similar that of modern gars, having a long body with the dorsal and anal fins being very far back on the body. Both families, along with other lepisosteoids, have opisthocoelous vertebrae. Unlike lepisosteids, at least some obaichthyids may have increased the number of vertebrae in the caudal region (tail), with Obaichthys decoratus having a total of 30; though this apparent elongation may be due to under-sampling, especially when compared to modern species. The main difference in the postcrania between the two groups is the shape and composition of their scales; unlike lepisosteids, obaichthyid scales have a spine projecting from their posterior end (rearwards) along with multiple spines along the margins of each scale. There is a layer of dentine between the body of the scale and the ganoine layer; the placement of the dentine directly on top of bone is similar to what is seen in "palaeoniscoid" fish. This difference in scale morphology has caused the family to be referred to as either "spiny-" or "spike gars".

== Classification ==
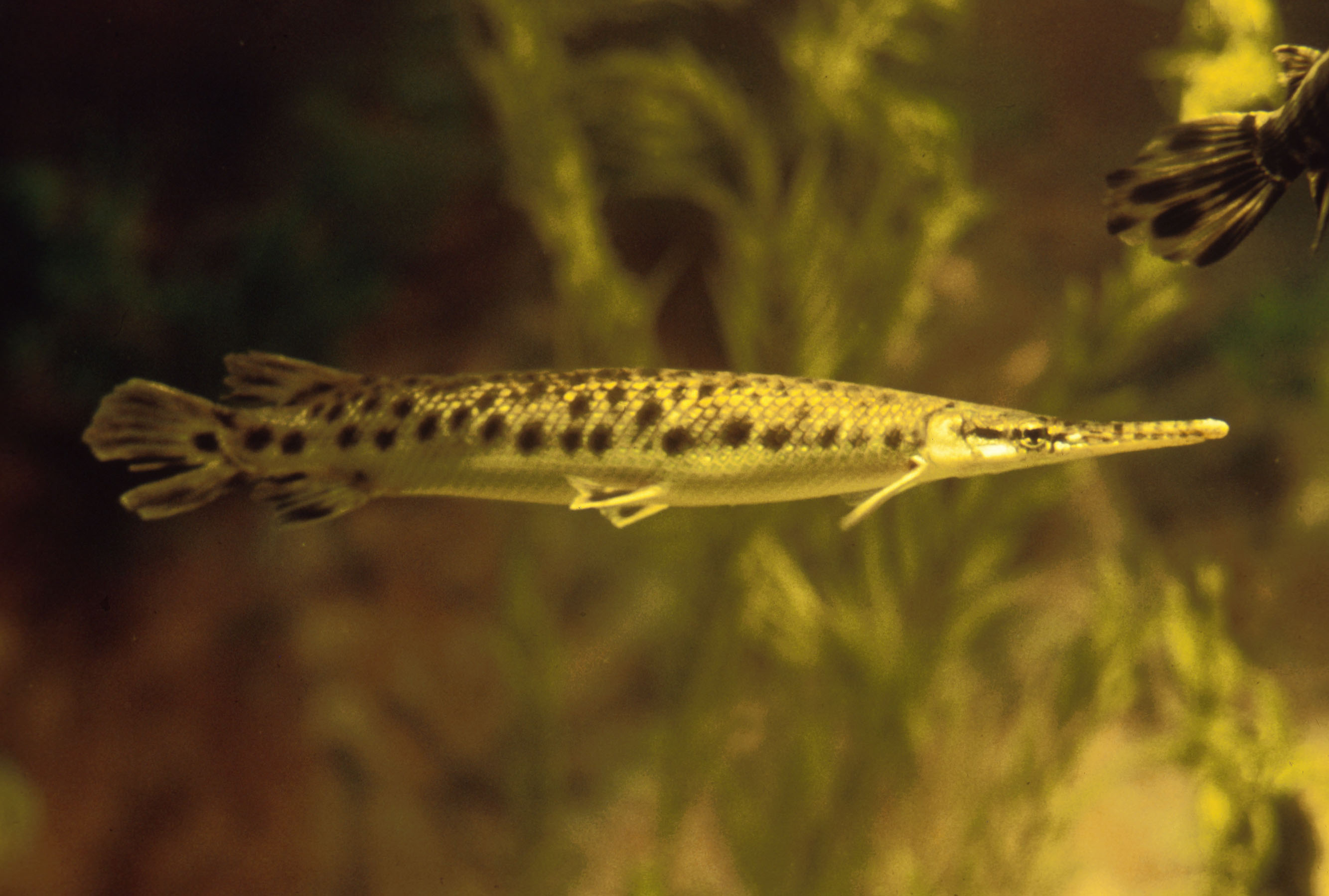
A spotted gar, member of the sister group to Obaichthyidae.

Obaichthyidae is thought to be the sister group of Lepisosteidae with the two groups making up Lepisosteoidea. Even so, it is not confirmed whether this family is monophyletic, as Arbarello (2012) found it to not be the case, though even within that study, it is agreed that members of the family are sister to one another. In this paper, it was defined as a stem-based taxon containing all taxa more closely related to Obaichthys than to the genera Lepisosteus, Pliodetes or Lepidotes.

- - - - - - Lepisosteus
          - Atractosteus
        - †Masillosteus
      - †Dentilepisosteus
      - †Obaichthys
    - †Pliodetes
    - †Araripelepidotes
  - †Isanichthys
  - - - †Lepidotes maximus
      - †Lepidotes laevis
      - †Lepidotes mantelli
    - †Scheenstia zappi
  - - †Lepidotes semiserratus
    - †Lepidotes gigas

== Evolutionary history ==
It is suggested that the family diverged from the modern gar lineage around 140 mya, which would have followed the separation of North and South America with the family likely originating in South America. A radiation between groups living on South America and Africa is seen due to the later opening of the South Atlantic. This trend is also seen in a variety of other fish groups including mawsoniid coelacanths, vidalamiins, and cladocyclids. Though the family has mostly been found in Gondwana, a species of Obaichthys has been found in multiple sites in Europe.

=== Paleoenvironment ===
Like modern gars, they appear to have preferred freshwater & brackish environments but were tolerant of marine conditions, allowing them to disperse across oceanic habitats. Also similar to their extant relatives, obaichthyids are mostly found in warmer environments, with the range of the two groups overlapping at formations like the Kem Kem.

=== Paleoecology ===
Due to various features of the mouth, it is unlikely that obaichthyids had a similar diet to modern gars with the family most likely not feeding on large prey. It is more likely that these fish fed mostly on invertebrates with a feeding style similar to what is seen in syngnathiforms, a method akin to pivot feeding.
