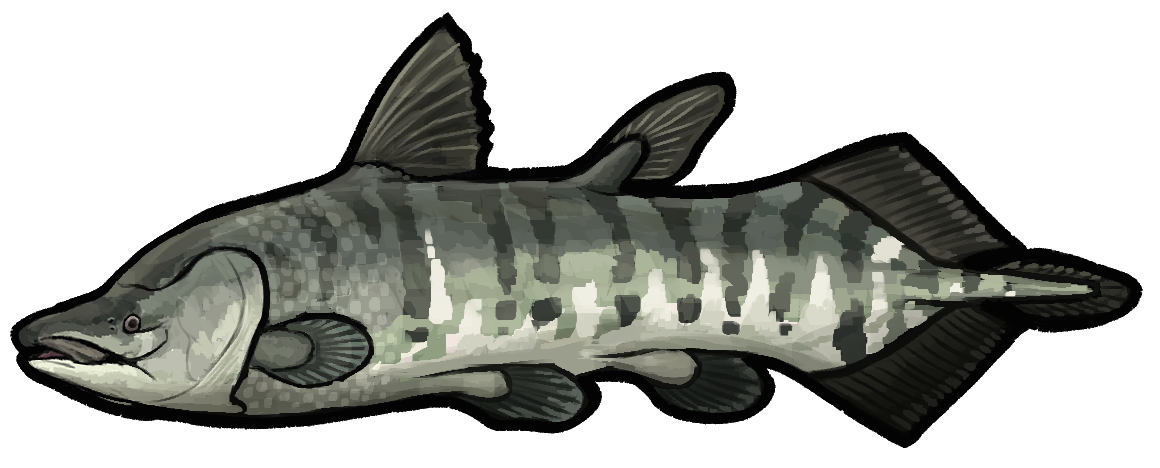
- Restoration

Scientific classification
- Kingdom: Animalia
- Phylum: Chordata
- Class: Actinistia
- Order: Coelacanthiformes
- Suborder: Latimerioidei
- Family: †Mawsoniidae
- Genus: †Chinlea; Schaeffer, 1967

Type species
- †Chinlea sorenseni Schaeffer, 1967

= Chinlea =

Chinlea Temporal range: 228.0–203.6 Ma Late Triassic

Extinct genus of coelacanths

Chinlea is an extinct genus of late Triassic Mawsoniid coelacanth fish found in and named after the Chinle Formation that crops out in the southwestern states of Arizona and New Mexico. The word “Chinle” comes from the Navajo word meaning "flowing out", referencing the location where water flows out of the Canyon de Chelly. They were also possibly found in the Dockum Group.

== Discovery and description ==
Chinlea (middle left) compared to some other prehistoric fish.

Chinlea was described by Bob Schaeffer in 1967 from type specimen Chinlea sorenseni (AMNH 5652) found in the upper part of the Chinle Formation, Little Valley, San Juan County, Utah. When it was described Chinlea was thought to be most closely related to Diplurus from the Dockum Group because of their similar basisphenoid, long ossified pleural ribs, pelvic plate and unpaired basal plate shape, and supplementary caudal lobe length. Their long ossified ribs might have been mechanically related to more efficient swimming. However Schaeffer differentiated Chinlea from Diplurus by its greater posterior extension of the supratemporal; increased ossification of the extrascapulars; a robust antroventral process on the lateral rostral; larger and triangular postorbital; longer dentary with notched posterior border; anteriorly narrowed angular; small, numerous, closely spaced teeth on dentary; large, tusk-like teeth on premaxilla dermopalatine, possibly ectopterygoid, and precoracoid; and no denticles on anterior borders of the dorsal and caudal fins.

Chinlea was originally described as being 32-100 mm and an estimated 160-500 mm in length, but a later C. sorenseni skull collected in the same area confirmed that some undetermined remains belonged to Chinlea and that they could get at least up to 200, possibly 800 mm.

== Phylogeny ==
Mawsoniids had two main episodes of diversification; Chinlea occurred during the Triassic episode in North America which also has a younger taxon in South America (Parnaibaia). Chinlea and the Mawsoniid taxa after it all have extrascapulars integrated to the postparietal shield covering the neurocranium. Chinlea and Mawsonia also have an even number of extrascapulars. Compared to Mawsonia and Axelrodichthys, the bifurcated region of the dentary on Chinlea is longer and angles upwards. Mawsonia and Axelrodichtys also have a high coronoid eminence that Chinlea does not. Of the species on the cladogram, Chinlea is the only one not known to continue into the Jurassic, and Mawsonia and Axelrodichthys did not even evolve until the Jurassic.

The following cladogram is based on Cavin et al. (2019).

- - Outgroup
  - - - Diplurus
      - - - Parnaibaia
          - - - Chinlea
              - - - Mawsonia
                  - Axelrodichthys

== Paleoenvironment and paleoecology ==
Chinlea likely lived in North and South America close to the equator. Unlike marine Latimeriids which include the one genus of extant coelacanths, Mawsoniids could also inhabit fresh or brackish water. The fluvial and lacustrine depositions in the Chinle Formation suggest an area with large bodies of water and a seasonal monsoonal climate. Chinlea lived alongside their likely prey Ceratodus (lungfish) that made burrows to avoid desiccation and lie dormant, giving evidence of a dry season. The postorbital bone bridging across the intercranial joint, which is characteristic of Mawsoniids, suggests they had a smaller gape for suction feeding than other coelacanths and would have to eat relatively smaller prey. Chinlea also lived with at least 10 species of Osteichthyes (bony fish), Hybodontids (shark relatives), Metoposaurids (amphibian), and Phytosaurids (reptile). While there were changes to the terrestrial and aquatic tetrapod taxa, fish fauna did not have any major change throughout the formation.
