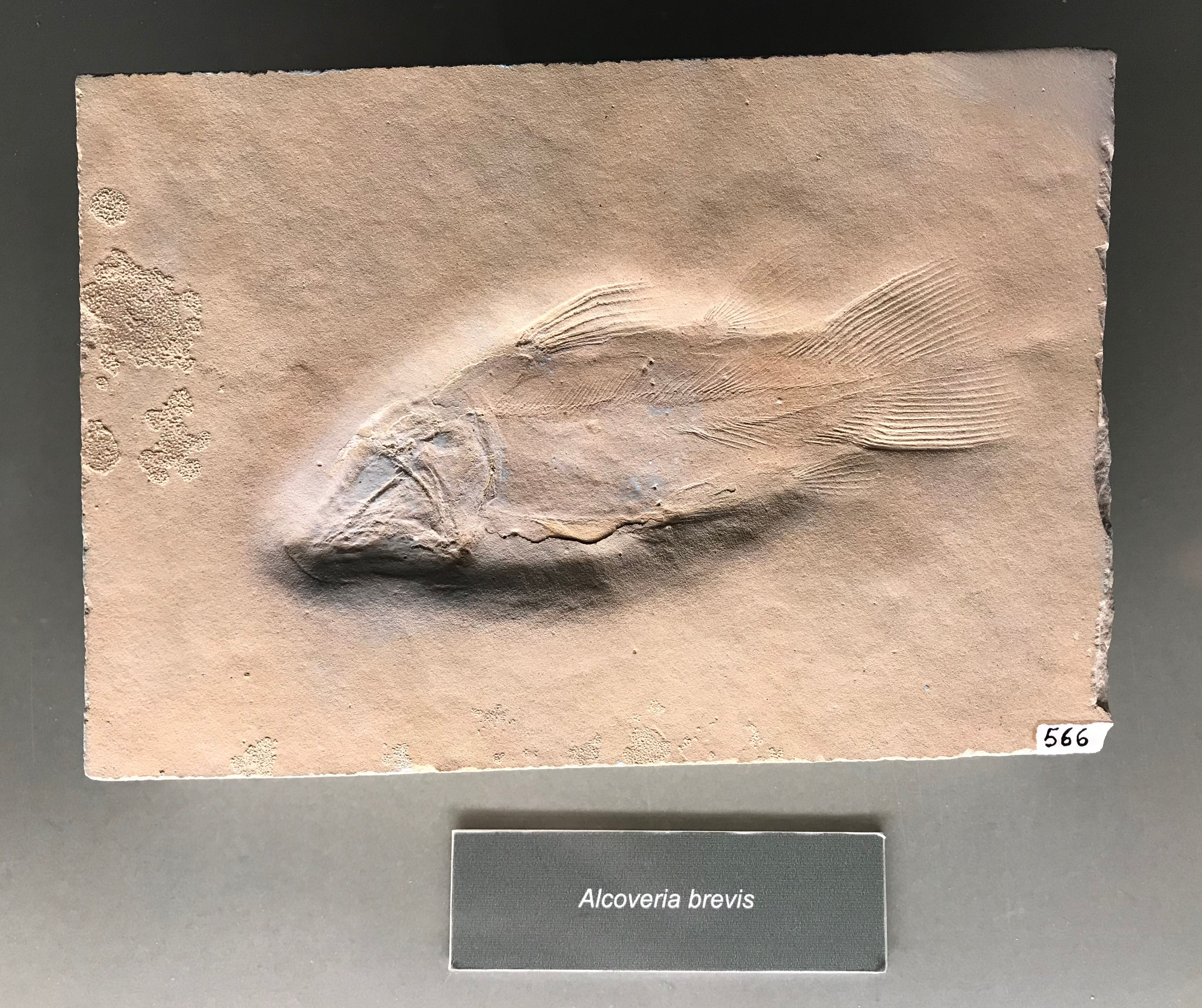
- Specimen of A. brevis

Scientific classification
- Kingdom: Animalia
- Phylum: Chordata
- Class: Actinistia
- Order: Coelacanthiformes
- Suborder: Latimerioidei
- Family: †Mawsoniidae
- Genus: †Alcoveria; Beltan, 1972
- Species: †A. brevis

Binomial name
- †Alcoveria brevis Beltan, 1972

= Alcoveria =

Alcoveria Temporal range: Middle Triassic (Ladinian)

Extinct genus of coelacanths

Alcoveria is an extinct genus of mawsoniid coelacanth fish which lived during the Middle Triassic of Europe. It contains a single known species, A. brevis, known from a well preserved specimen from the Muschelkalk of Spain. It lived in a marine environment, being one of the few mawsoniids known to do so. Although it can be assigned to the Mawsoniidae, the lack of well-developed pleural libs precludes a finer taxonomic assignment. Prominent denticles are known on its fin rays.
