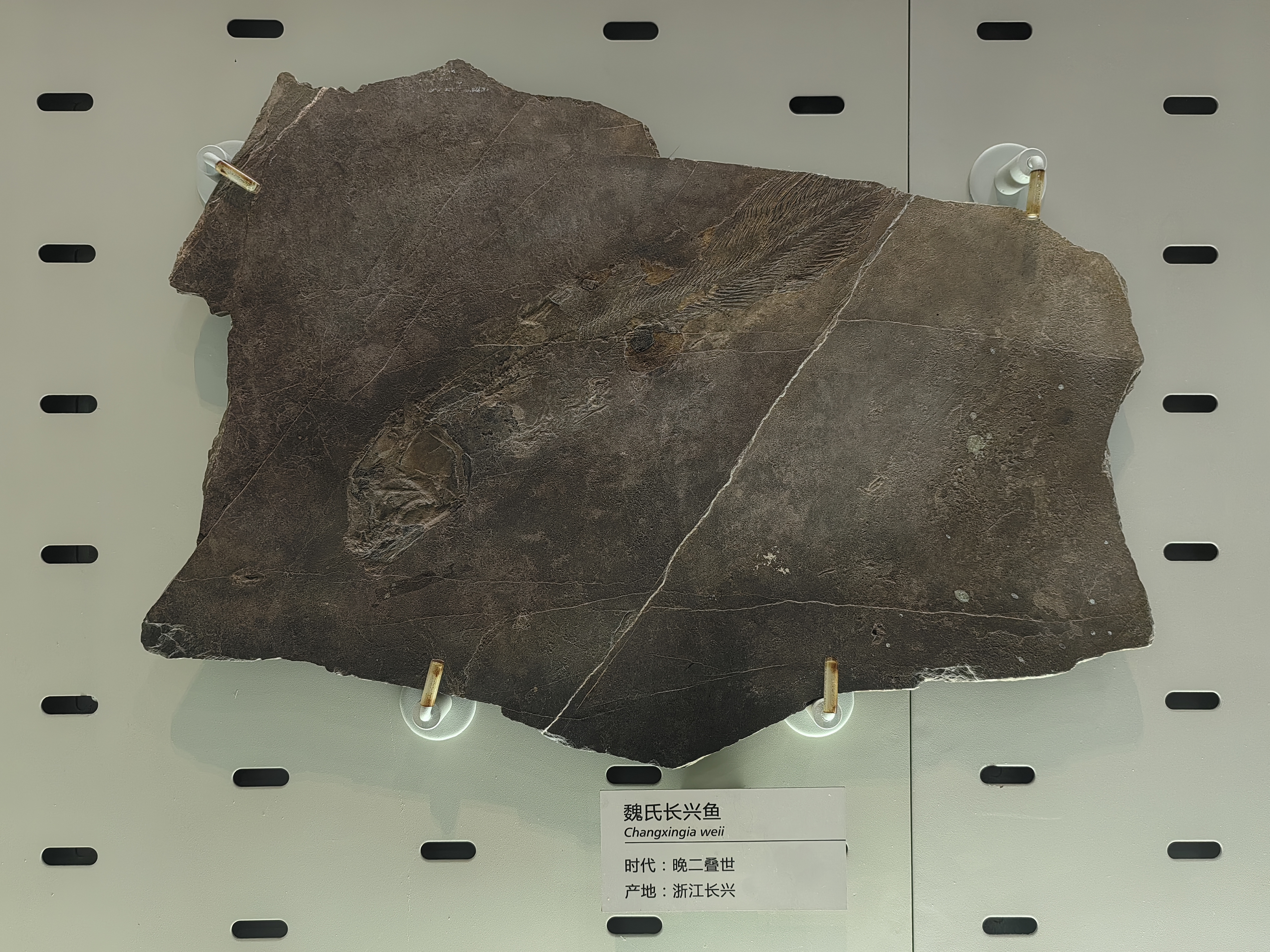
- Changxingia weii in the Zhejiang Museum of Natural History

Scientific classification
- Kingdom: Animalia
- Phylum: Chordata
- Class: Actinistia
- Order: Coelacanthiformes
- Suborder: Latimerioidei
- Family: †Mawsoniidae
- Genus: †Changxingia; Wang & Liu, 1981

Species
- †C. aspratilis Wang & Liu, 1981; †C. weii Jin, 1997

= Changxingia =

Changxingia Temporal range: Changhsingian

Extinct genus of fishes

Changxingia is a genus of prehistoric marine lobe-finned fish that belonged to the coelacanth family Mawsoniidae. It lived during the Late Permian in Zhejiang, southern China. It contains two species, C. aspiratilis Wang & Liu, 1981 (the type species) and C. weii Jin, 1997, which were named in 1981 and 1997 from specimens found at the same locality. They are the first Permian marine coelacanths found in Asia.

It is thought to be the oldest known representative of the family Mawsoniidae, which are related to the extant latimeriids, although this placement has been disputed and little taxonomic analysis has been done to verify it.

It is named after the Changxing Formation, the geological formation it was found in, which also gives its name to the Changhsingian, the final stage of the Permian period.
