= Indocoelacanthus =

Indocoelacanthus Temporal range: Early Jurassic (Toarcian)
- Skull diagram

Scientific classification
- Kingdom: Animalia
- Phylum: Chordata
- Class: Actinistia
- Order: Coelacanthiformes
- Suborder: Latimerioidei
- Family: †Mawsoniidae
- Genus: †Indocoelacanthus; Jain, 1974
- Species: †I. robustus

Binomial name
- †Indocoelacanthus robustus Jain, 1974

Extinct genus of fishes

Indocoelacanthus is an extinct genus of prehistoric freshwater coelacanth from the early-mid Jurassic of India. It contains a single species, I. robustus from the Toarcian-aged upper Kota Formation of Andhra Pradesh. The holotype specimen, consisting of an almost complete head and trunk squamation, was found in riverine sediments in the Pranhita-Godavari Valley at Boraigudem limestone ridge, about 30 kilometers southeast of Sironcha. In addition to the holotype, several other referred specimens consisting of the caudal fin, fin rays, and neural arches have also been identified. All specimens are preserved in the museum of the Indian Statistical Institute.

Its taxonomic placement has long been uncertain, with it initially being described in the Coelacanthidae, and having an unstable taxonomic position in later analyses. A comprehensive review in 2025 identified it as a basal member of the Mawsoniidae, a widespread coelacanth group throughout much of the Mesozoic.

It is the largest known fish in the Kota Formation, reaching an estimated total length of 70 centimetres (2.3 ft).

== See also ==
- Sarcopterygii
- List of sarcopterygians
- List of prehistoric bony fish
