= Stromerichthys =

Stromerichthys Temporal range: Cenomanian

Scientific classification
- Kingdom: Animalia
- Phylum: Chordata
- Clade: Osteichthyes
- Genus: †Stromerichthys; Weiler, 1935
- Species: †S. aethiopicus

Binomial name
- †Stromerichthys aethiopicus Weiler, 1935

Extinct genus of fishes

Stromerichthys ("Stromer's fish") is an extinct genus of potentially chimaeric freshwater bony fish that lived during the Late Cretaceous epoch. It contains a single species, S. aethiopicus, described from a now-lost specimen with bones & scales from Egypt.

It was initially described as an amiiform related to the modern bowfin from scales and skeletal remains recovered in the Cenomanian-aged Bahariya Formation of Egypt; this type specimen was later destroyed during the bombing of the Palaeontological Museum, Munich in World War II. Later, isolated scales assigned to Stromerichthys were recovered from the earlier Cenomanian of southern Europe (Portugal, France & Spain), and the Albian of the Democratic Republic of the Congo.

In 2015, Cavin et al found Stromerichthys to most likely be a chimera (a fossil taxon erected on a mixture of different taxa), with the skeletal remains of the type specimen likely belonging to the giant bichir Bawitius & a mawsoniid coelacanth, while the scales found with the type specimen and throughout Europe & Africa belonged to the extinct gar relative Obaichthys. The destruction of the type specimen means that Bawitius or Obaichthys cannot be considered junior synonyms of Stromerichthys, and it is thus likely an invalid genus.

== See also ==
- Prehistoric fish
- List of prehistoric bony fish
