= Kemkemia =

Kemkemia Temporal range: Cenomanian

Scientific classification
- Kingdom: Animalia
- Phylum: Chordata
- Class: Reptilia
- Clade: Archosauria
- Clade: Pseudosuchia
- Clade: Crocodylomorpha
- Clade: Solidocrania
- Clade: Crocodyliformes
- Genus: †Kemkemia; Cau & Maganuco, 2009
- Species: †K. auditorei

Binomial name
- †Kemkemia auditorei Cau & Maganuco, 2009

Extinct genus of reptiles

Kemkemia is a genus of probable crocodyliforms living in the Cretaceous, described from a single fossil that was recovered in 1999 from Morocco by an Italian team searching for fossil invertebrates. The fossil of Kemkemia dates from the Cenomanian age.

== History ==
The type species, Kemkemia auditorei, was named and described in 2009 by Italian paleontologists Andrea Cau and Simone Maganuco and is based on a single distal caudal vertebra, MSNM V6408. This vertebra measures 60.48 mm in length and 33.81 mm in height. The genus name refers to the Kem Kem Beds and the specific name honours Italian paleontological illustrator Marco Auditore.

== Description ==
The describers, because of the general morphology of the vertebra, especially the strongly developed neural spine, originally considered it likely that K. auditorei was a theropod dinosaur belonging to the group Neoceratosauria. In view of the limited remains, they cautiously assigned it to a more general Neotheropoda incertae sedis. However, the authors later discovered it to be a typical crocodyliform, rather than an unusual theropod. Meanwhile, spinosaurids and crocodyliforms share a number of morphological convergences, and the Kemkemia holotype shows a combination of features between "Sigilmassasaurus" and crocodyliforms. Therefore, it is not determinable whether K. auditorei is a crocodyliform or a spinosaurid.

Kemkemia was a predator with a body length of about 4–5 m (13–16 ft) and, given that the vertebra is not very robust, possibly lightly built. The species length could be extrapolated because the specimen is that of an adult.

== Paleoecology ==
The fossil is one of the few probable known crocodyliform caudal vertebrae. It comes from the Kem Kem Beds that have produced the fossils of very large predatory dinosaur genera: Spinosaurus, Carcharodontosaurus and Deltadromeus.
