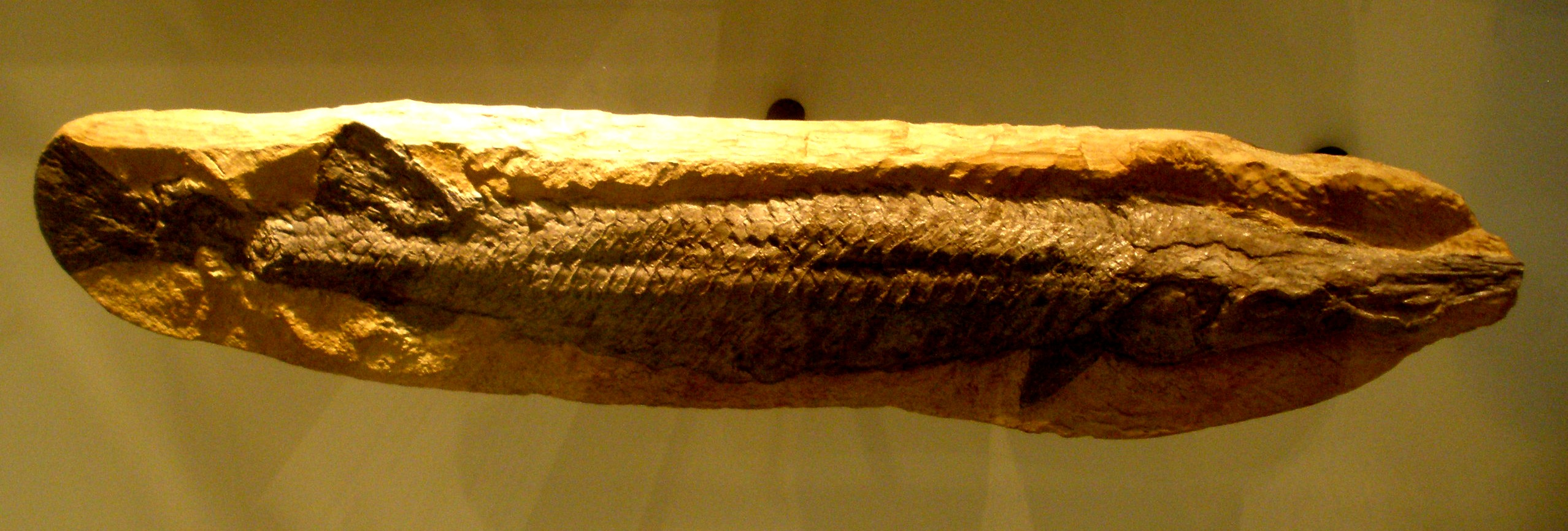
- Specimen of O. decoratus

Scientific classification
- Kingdom: Animalia
- Phylum: Chordata
- Class: Actinopterygii
- Clade: Ginglymodi
- Order: Lepisosteiformes
- Family: †Obaichthyidae
- Genus: †Obaichthys; Wenz & Brito, 1992

Species
- †O. africanus Grande, 2010; †O. decoratus Wenz & Brito, 1992 (type species)

Synonyms
- †Stromerichthys Weiler, 1935 (in part); †Afrocascudo? Brito et al., 2024 (Disputed)

= Obaichthys =

Obaichthys Temporal range: Albian to Cenomanian

Extinct genus of fishes

Obaichthys is an extinct genus of lepisosteiform fish that inhabited South America, Africa, and southern Europe during the mid-Cretaceous period. It closely resembled modern gars, which it was related to, but differed in its spiny scales and restricted mouth gape. The genus name references the Yoruba spirit Ọba, who is worshiped in the Candomblé religion in Brazil.

The following species are known:

- †O. africanus Grande, 2010 - Cenomanian of Morocco (Kem Kem Group), Algeria (Gara Samani Formation), Egypt (Bahariya Formation), Spain (Arenas de Utrillas Formation & La Cabaña Formation), Portugal (Tentúgal Formation), France (Aquitaine Basin), and Maranhão, Brazil (Alcântara Formation)
- †O. decoratus Wenz & Brito, 1992 (type species) - Early Albian of Ceará, Brazil (Romualdo Formation)

Indeterminate scales of Obaichthys, formerly referred to chimera genus "Stromerichthys", are known from the Albian of the Democratic Republic of the Congo. Notably, these scales are morphologically more similar to those of the concurrent O. decoratus from Brazil than with the younger O. africanus, despite the latter being on found on the same continent. The species O. laevis was also initially described in this genus, but was later moved into its own genus, Dentilepisosteus, which is the only other confirmed genus in the family Obaichthyidae. Much like Obaichthys, Dentilepisosteus is known from both South America and Africa.

Obaichthys remains have been discovered in formations representing both freshwater and marine environments, suggesting it was a euryhaline fish that primarily inhabited freshwater & brackish environments but was tolerant of saltwater, much like modern gars. Evidence for such a euryhaline behavior has been found in the distribution and localities of both Obaichthys species.
