= Afrocascudo =

Afrocascudo Temporal range: Late Cretaceous (early Cenomanian), ~100–95 Ma

Scientific classification
- Kingdom: Animalia
- Phylum: Chordata
- Class: Actinopterygii
- Subclass: Neopterygii
- Order: incertae sedis
- Genus: †Afrocascudo; Brito et al., 2024
- Species: †A. saharaensis

Binomial name
- †Afrocascudo saharaensis Brito et al., 2024

Genus of extinct fish

Afrocascudo is a controversial genus of extinct neopterygian fish, that has been hypothesized to be either an ancient loricariid catfish or a juvenile obaichthyid lepisosteiform of the genus Obaichthys. It is known from the Late Cretaceous Douira Formation (Kem Kem Group) of Morocco. The genus contains a single species, A. saharaensis, known from a partial articulated specimen.

== Discovery and naming ==
The Afrocascudo holotype specimen, MHNM-KK-OT 36 a—c, was discovered in sediments of the Douira Formation (Jbel Oum Tkout locality) of the Kem Kem Group near Tafraoute Sidi Ali in Errachidia Province, southeastern Morocco. The articulated specimen consists of a nearly complete fish collected in three pieces. It is missing parts of the head and fins.

In 2024, Brito et al. described Afrocascudo saharaensis as a new genus and species of loricariid catfishes based on these fossil remains. The generic name, Afrocascudo, combines the Latin word "Afro", meaning "Africa", with the Portuguese "cascudo", the common name used in Brazil for certain armoured catfishes. The specific name, saharaensis, references the Sahara Desert of North Africa, from which the holotype was discovered.

The describers of Afrocascudo suggested that this fossil represents the oldest known catfish and, as such, the oldest known loricarioid. Before its description, the Argentinian Hoplisoma revelatum was the oldest known loricarioid, from the Late Paleocene (~58.5 Ma). The presence of a crown group loricarioid catfish in the Late Cretaceous would indicate that the clade had already significantly diversified much earlier than was previously thought. This hypothesis has been disputed by other researchers who posit that the remains do not belong to a catfish.

== Description ==
Size of Afrocascudo, restored as an early catfish, compared to a human hand

Afrocascudo was a small fish, with an estimated total body length of 74 millimetres (2.9 in). About 35% of the total body length is incorporated by the head. The top and sides of the body and head are covered in odontode-coated bony plates. The skull roof is triangular, with a long, pointed snout and expanded orbit region. It had approximately 30 vertebrae in total. The distal end of the caudal fin, though not entirely preserved, seems to be symmetrically rounded with 14 rays. The dorsal fin includes a small anterior spinelet, a larger spine, and 8-9 rays. The pelvic fin has six parallel rays. A physical anal fin is not preserved, and although its presence was argued by Brito et al. based on four rays allegedly observable as impressions, a later comment disputed this.

== Classification ==
In their phylogenetic analyses, Brito et al. (2024) recovered Afrocascudo within the diverse siluriform (catfish) clade Loricariidae. Loricariids—including Afrocascudo—are regarded as the "armoured catfishes", with around 1,220 extant species. Their results are displayed in the cladogram below:

- - Diplomystidae
  - Loricarioidei
    - Nematogenyidae
    - - Trichomycteridae
      - - Callichthyidae
        - - Scoloplacidae
          - - Astroblepidae
            - Loricariidae
              - Lithogenes villosus
              - - †Afrocascudo
                - Pterygoplichthys multiradiatus

However, in the same year, Britz et al. considered this taxonomic placement fallacious, and reinterpreted Afrocascudo as a juvenile obaichthyid lepisosteiform, most likely an immature individual of the contemporary Obaichthys. They noted significant morphological differences between this taxon and true loriicarids, and observed that the identified traits are more similar to those of Obaichthys. Britz et al. discussed their skepticism based on the erroneous phylogenetic data matrix and reconstruction of the taxon from the previous study by Brito et al., the latter of which does not closely match the fossilized remains. They also pointed out that Brito et al. only provided the arguments in favor of their conclusion without an extensive discussion, and that their hypotheses would all be considered doubtful if Afrocascudo is considered a non-teleost fish. As such, they argued that Afrocascudo should be considered a junior synonym of Obaichthys.

Shortly after the comment by Britz, Brito et al. published a rebuttal paper, acknowledging that their reconstruction took artistic liberties, proposing a possible in-life appearance for the species. They further admitted to small errors in the original study, specifically in the phylogenetic matrix and one of the figures from the supplementary data. They also concurred with Britz et al. that features of the caudal endoskeleton are not easily distinguishable. Still, they criticized Britz et al. for proposing a taxonomic status change of Afrocascudo on the basis of simple comparisons without testing hypothesis (i.e. reproducing 3D renderings), and considered the interpretation of the taxon as a juvenile lepisosteiform or a holostean unlikely. In their rebuttal, Brito et al. further claimed that Afrocascudo could not be a juvenile since the type specimen is completely ossified, an indicator for maturity. They also noted the absence of important holostean characters including the canalicules found in gar scales and the presence of teleost fish traits, such as the structure of the caudal fin, histological features, and the dorsal and lateral surfaces which are covered with bony plates and odontodes. Additionally, all principal rays of the median fins in lepisosteiforms are segmented and branched, which is different from the dorsal fin of Afrocascudo. Thus, they stood by their original conclusion that Afrocascudo represents the oldest known catfish.

== Paleoecology ==
Afrocascudo is known from the Douira Formation (Kem Kem Group) of Morocco, which dates to the Cenomanian age of the late Cretaceous period. This locality represents a fresh water environment that would have dried seasonally. Many other fossil animals have been found in similar outcrops, such as various invertebrates, other fish, amphibians, crocodylomorphs, and dinosaurs including the large theropods Carcharodontosaurus and Spinosaurus.
