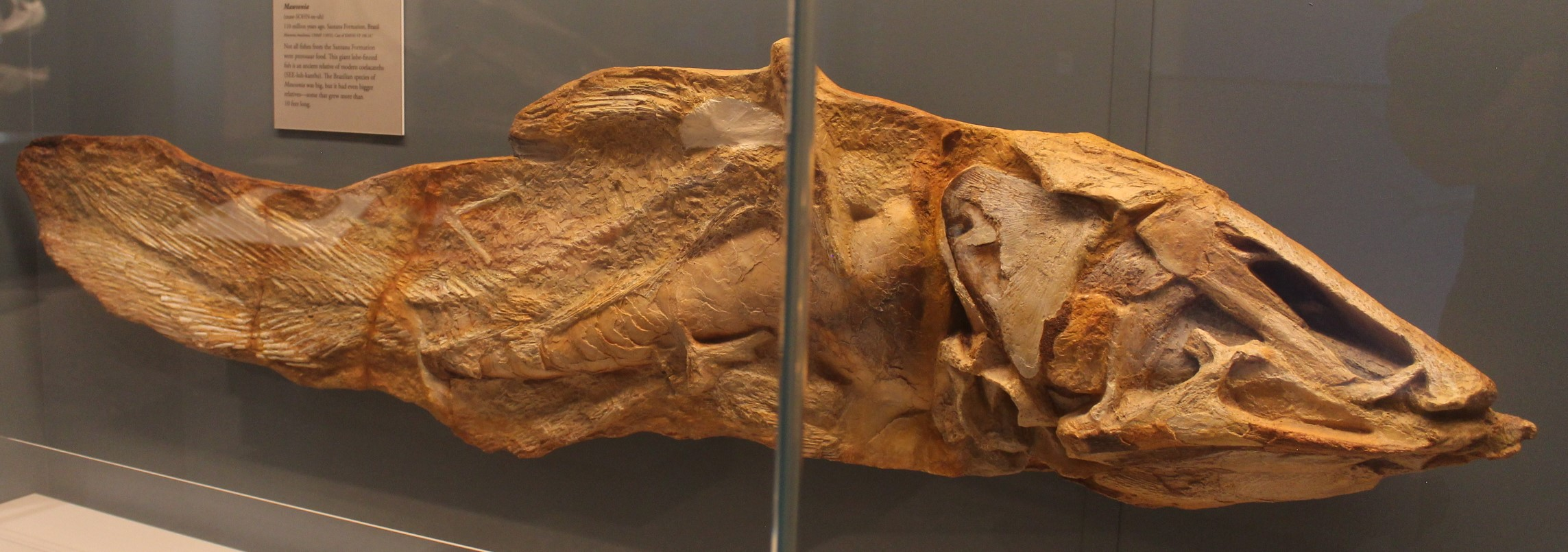
- M. brasiliensis fossil, University of Michigan Museum of Natural History
- Skull diagram of Mawsonia gigas

Scientific classification
- Kingdom: Animalia
- Phylum: Chordata
- Class: Actinistia
- Order: Coelacanthiformes
- Suborder: Latimerioidei
- Family: †Mawsoniidae
- Genus: †Mawsonia; Woodward, 1907

Type species
- †Mawsonia gigas Woodward, 1907

Other Species
- †M. brasiliensis Yabumoto, 2002; †M. minor? Woodward, 1908; †M. libyca? Weiler, 1935; †M. soba Brito, 2018; †M. tegamensis Wenz, 1975; †M. ubangiensis? Casier, 1961

= Mawsonia (fish) =

Mawsonia Temporal range: Kimmeridgian-Cenomanian ~152–94 Ma

Extinct genus of coelacanths

Mawsonia is an extinct genus of prehistoric coelacanth fish. It is amongst the largest of all coelacanths, with one quadrate specimen (DGM 1.048-P) possibly belonging to an individual measuring 5.3 metres (17.4 feet) in length. It lived in freshwater and brackish environments from the late Jurassic to the mid-Cretaceous (Kimmeridgian to Cenomanian stages, about 152 to 96 million years ago) of South America, eastern North America, and Africa. Mawsonia was first described by British paleontologist Arthur Smith Woodward in 1907.

== Description ==
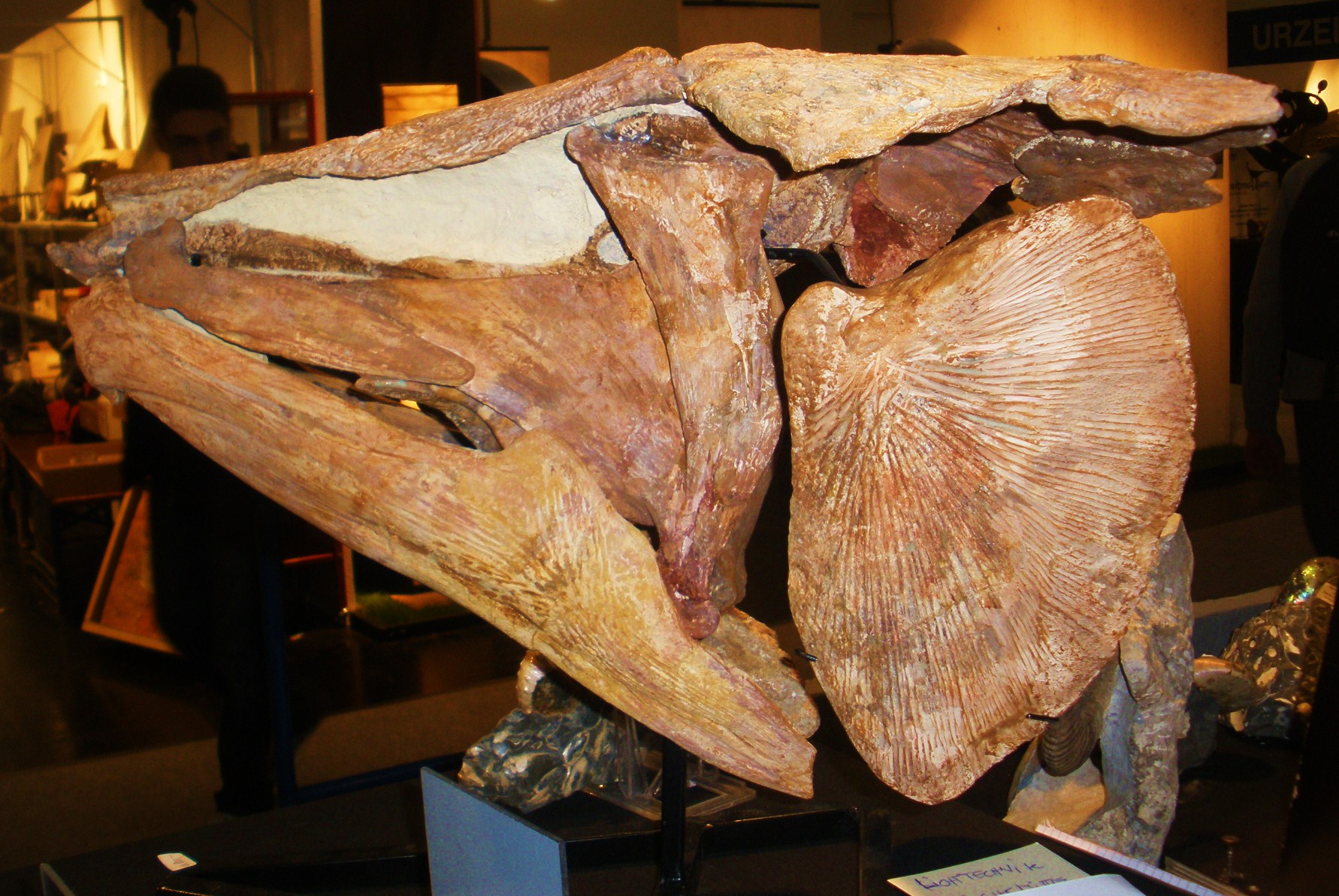
Restored head

The fish has six fins: two on the top of the body, two on the sides, one at the end of its tail and one at the bottom of its tail. Rather than having teeth, the inside of the mouth was covered in small (1-2 mm) denticles. It reached at least 3.5 m (11.5 ft) in length, although a 2021 study suggest one specimen known from a fragmentary quadrate skull bone possibly reached 5.3 m (17.4 ft). It was only rivaled in size among coelacanths by the related Trachymetopon. A 2024 study suggested that very large size estimates should be treated with caution due to being based on fragmentary remains and uncertain scaling relationships between skull elements and total body length.

== Taxonomy ==
The genus was named by Arthur Smith Woodward in 1907, from specimens found in the Early Cretaceous (Hauterivian) aged Ilhas Group of Bahia, Brazil.

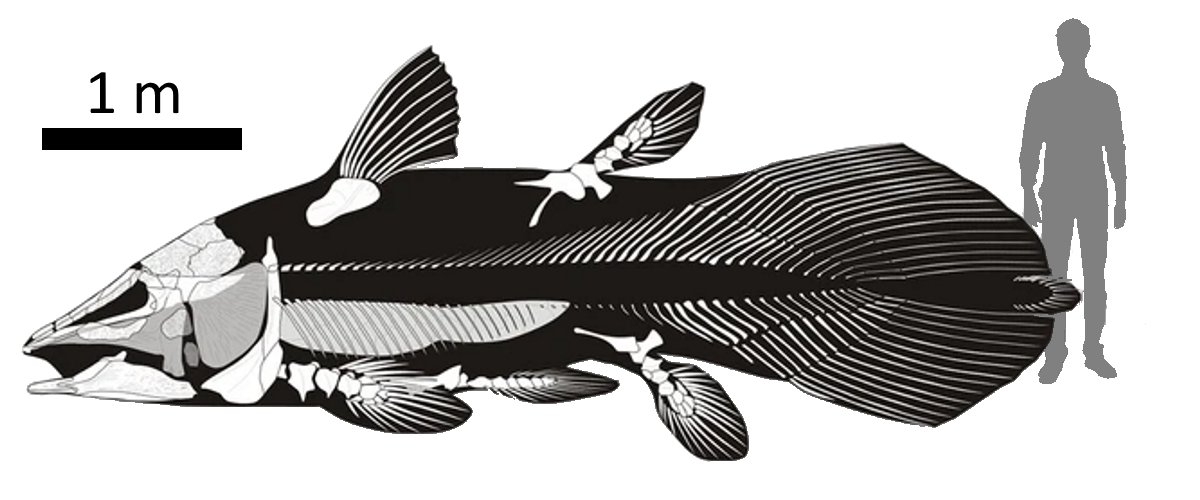
Skeletal reconstruction of Mawsonia gigas, showing estimated size of largest known individual

Fossils have been found on three continents; in South America they have been found in the Bahia Group, Romualdo, Alcântara, Brejo Santo and Missão Velha Formations of Brazil, and the Tacuarembó Formation of Uruguay. In Africa, they are known from the Continental Intercalaire of Algeria and Tunisia, the Ain el Guettar Formation of Tunisia, the Kem Kem Group of Morocco, and the Babouri Figuil Basin of Cameroon, spanning from the Late Jurassic, to early Late Cretaceous. Fossils assigned to Mawsonia have also been found in Woodbine Formation of Texas, USA, then part of the island continent Appalachia.

The type species is Mawsonia gigas, named and described in 1907. Numerous distinct species have been described since then. M. brasiliensis, M. libyca, M. minor, and M. ubangiensis have all been proposed to be synonyms of M. gigas, although Léo Fragoso's 2014 thesis on mawsoniids finds M. brasiliensis valid and cautions against synonymizing M. minor without further examination. Several recent publications consider M. brasiliensis to be valid as well. Although initially considered to belong to this genus, "Mawsonia" lavocati is most likely referable to Axelrodichthys instead.

== Ecology ==
Mawsonia was native to freshwater and brackish ecosystems. The diet of Mawsonia and their mechanism of feeding is uncertain. It has been suggested that the denticles were used to crush hard shelled organisms like crabs and snails (durophagy) or that prey was swallowed whole using suction feeding.
