= Lualabaea =

Lualabaea Temporal range: Kimmeridgian

Scientific classification
- Kingdom: Animalia
- Phylum: Chordata
- Class: Actinistia
- Order: Coelacanthiformes
- Suborder: Latimerioidei
- Family: †Mawsoniidae
- Genus: †Lualabaea; Saint-Seine, 1955
- Species: †L. lerichei

Binomial name
- †Lualabaea lerichei Saint-Seine, 1955

Synonyms
- Lualabaea henryi Saint-Seine, 1955

Extinct genus of fishes

Lualabaea is an extinct genus of prehistoric freshwater coelacanth, belonging to the family Mawsoniidae, from the Jurassic period. It contains a single species, L. lerichei Saint-Seine, 1955 (=L. henryi Saint-Seine, 1955), known from the Kimmeridgian-aged (formerly considered Middle Jurassic) Stanleyville Formation of the Democratic Republic of the Congo. It may be related to or possibly synonymous with Axelrodichthys.
