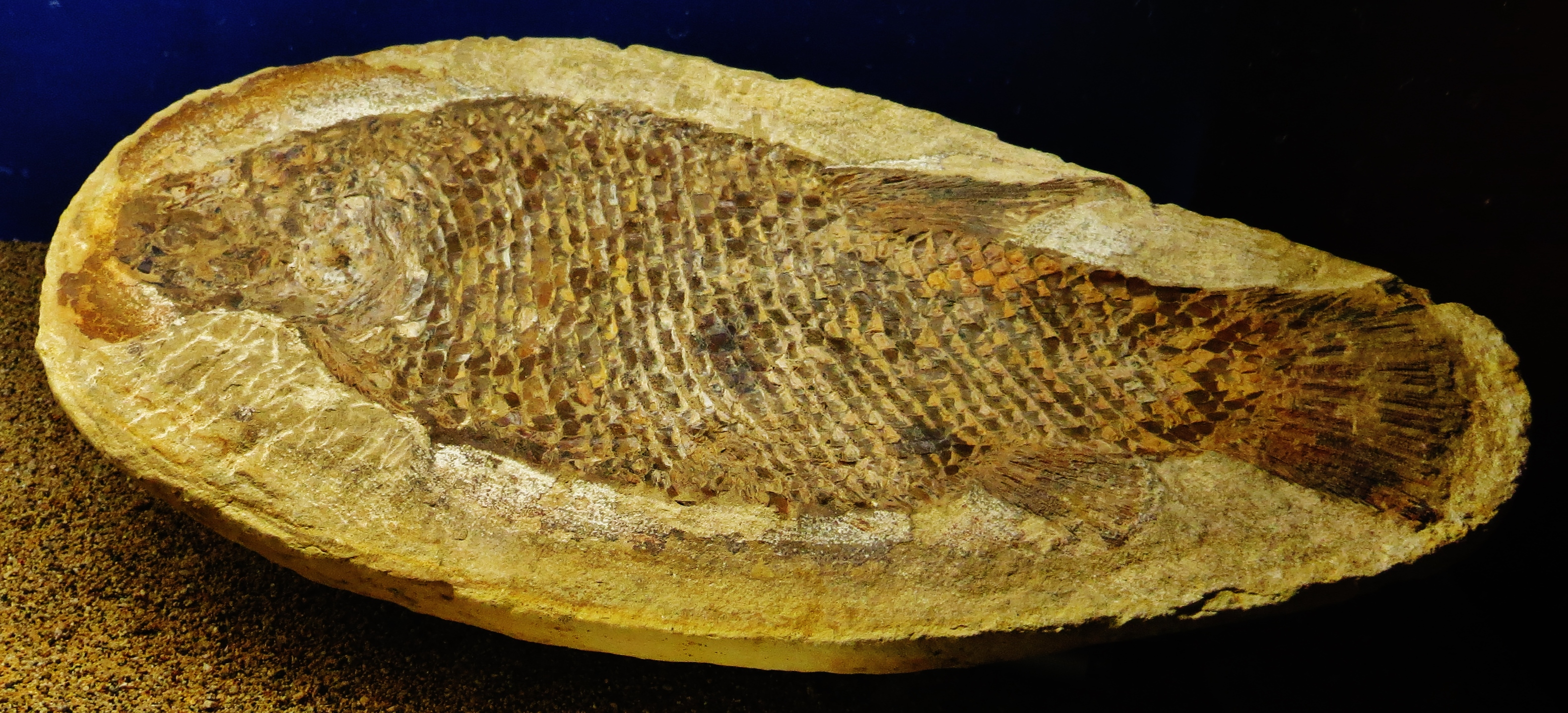

Scientific classification
- Kingdom: Animalia
- Phylum: Chordata
- Class: Actinopterygii
- Clade: Ginglymodi
- Order: Lepisosteiformes
- Suborder: Lepisosteioidei
- Genus: †Araripelepidotes (Silva Santos, 1990)

Type species
- †Lepidotes temnurus (= †Ararilepidotes temnurus) (Agassiz, 1841)

= Araripelepidotes =

Araripelepidotes Temporal range: 122.46–109.0 Ma

Genus of semionotiform fish

Araripelepidotes is a genus of ginglymodian fish.

== Habitat ==
Araripelepidotes was probably endemic to the Araripe Basin, and was commonly found in Santana formation, and rare in the Crato Formation, mostly in carbonate concretions, but uncommon in laminated limestones.

== Taxonomic history ==
The type species A. temnurus was formerly placed in the genus Lepidotes, until it was moved to the new genus in 1990. Formerly placed in the Semionotiformes, more recent morphological studies indicate that it is more closely related to extant gar, and is in fact more closely related to gar than "true" lepidotids such as Lepidotes.

== Paleoecology ==
Araripelepidotes was likely a toothless suction feeder, due to the development of its mobile maxilla and the presence of an interoperculum, and would have inhabited estuarine and freshwater environments. It is the only lepisosteiform known from the Araripe Basin, except for Lepidotes wenzae.
