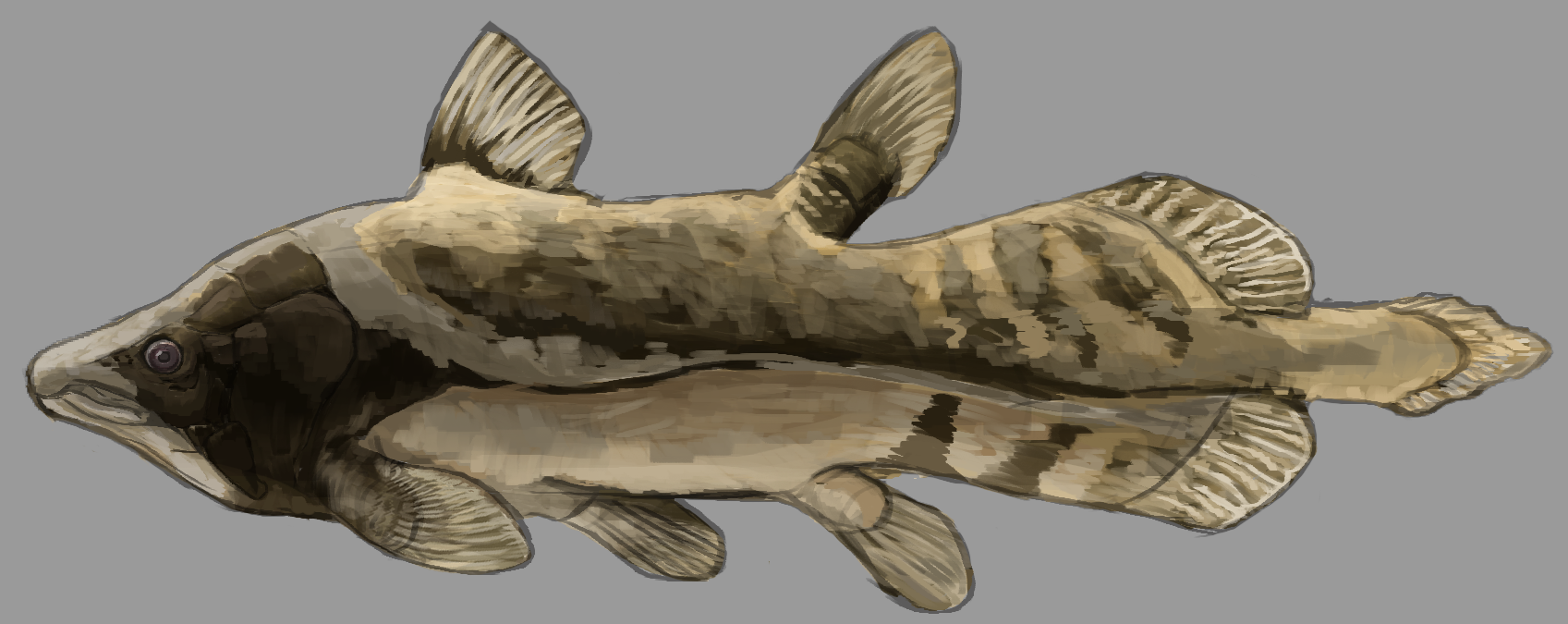
- Life restoration
- Skull diagram

Scientific classification
- Kingdom: Animalia
- Phylum: Chordata
- Class: Actinistia
- Order: Coelacanthiformes
- Suborder: Latimerioidei
- Family: †Mawsoniidae
- Genus: †Parnaibaia; Yabumoto 2008

Type species
- †Parnaibaia maranhaoensis Yabumoto, 2008

= Parnaibaia =

Parnaibaia Temporal range: Late Jurassic ~161.2–145.5 Ma

Extinct genus of fishes

Parnaibaia is a genus of coelacanth fish which lived during the Late Jurassic period. Parnaibaia fossils have been found in the Pastos Bons Formation in Maranhão, Brazil. Parnaibaia was described for the first time by palaeontologist Yoshitaka Yabumoto in 2008. Parnaibaia has been found in the Upper Jurassic of the Parnaíba Basin. In addition to Brazil, there is an uncertain record of Mawsoniidae in the Quebrada Vaquillas Altas locality, Upper Jurassic of Chile.
