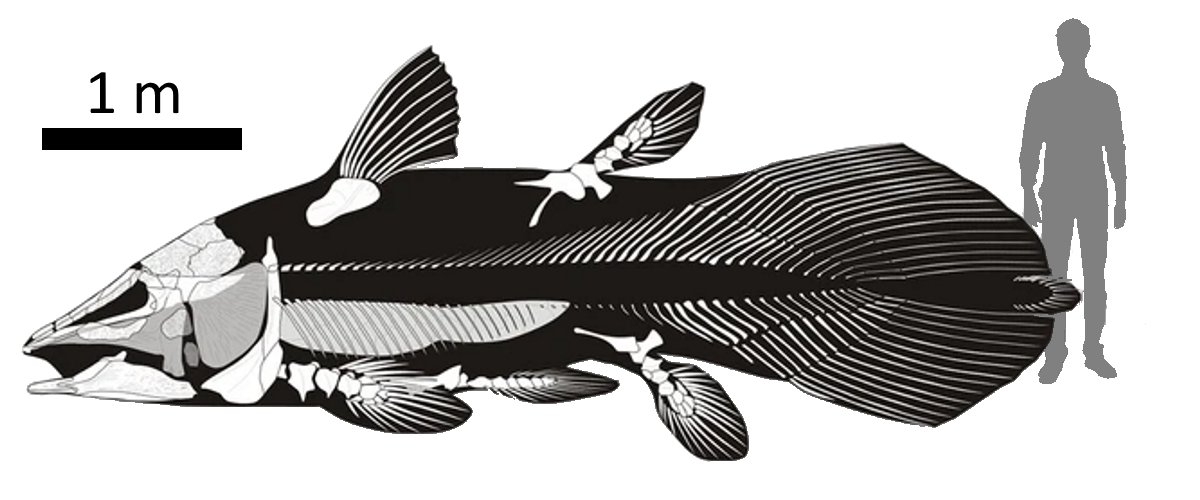
- Skeleton of a very large specimen of Mawsonia compared to a human

Scientific classification
- Kingdom: Animalia
- Phylum: Chordata
- Class: Actinistia
- Order: Coelacanthiformes
- Suborder: Latimerioidei
- Family: †Mawsoniidae; Schultze 1993

Genera
- †Alcoveria; †Changxingia?; †Graulia?; †Luopingcoelacanthus?; †Yunnancoelacanthus?; †Indocoelacanthus; †Diplurinae; †Diplurus; †Heptanema; †Reidus; †Mawsoniinae; †Axelrodichthys; †Chinlea; †Lualabaea; †Mawsonia (type); †Parnaibaia; †Trachymetopon

= Mawsoniidae =

Mawsoniids Temporal range: Triassic–Cretaceous

Extinct family of coelacanths

Mawsoniidae is an extinct family of prehistoric coelacanth fishes which lived during the Triassic to Cretaceous periods. Members of the family are distinguished from their sister group, the Latimeriidae (which contains the living coelacanths of the genus Latimeria) by the presence of ossified ribs, a coarse rugose texture on the dermatocranium and cheek bones, the absence of the suboperculum and the spiracular, and reduction or loss of the descending process of the supratemporal.

Mawsoniids are known from North America, Europe, South America, Africa, Madagascar and Asia. Unlike Latimeriidae, which are exclusively marine, Mawsoniidae were also native to freshwater and brackish environments.

Mawsoniids represent among the youngest known coelacanths, with the youngest known remains of the freshwater genus Axelrodichthys from France and an indeterminate marine species from Morocco being from the final stage of the Cretaceous, the Maastrichtian, roughly equivalent in age to the youngest known fossils of latimeriids. Species of Mawsonia and Trachymetopon are known to have exceeded 5 metres in length, making them among the largest known bony fish to have ever existed.

== Phylogeny ==
The following cladogram is after Manuelli et al., 2026.

- Latimerioidei
  - Latimeriidae
    ⊞
    - †Dobrogeria
    - †Graulia
    - †Loreleia
    - - †Ticinepomiinae
      - Latimeriinae
    ⊟
  - †Mawsoniidae
    - †Indocoelacanthus
    - - †Diplurinae
        - †Diplurus
        - †Heptanema
        - †Reidus
      - †Mawsoniinae
        - †Chinlea
        - †Parnaibaia
        - - Axelrodichthys
          - †Lualabaea
          - †Mawsonia
          - †Trachymetopon
