= Stromerosuchus =

Stromerosuchus Temporal range: Late Cretaceous, Cenomanian

Scientific classification
- Kingdom: Animalia
- Phylum: Chordata
- Class: Reptilia
- Superorder: Crocodylomorpha
- (unranked): Crocodyliformes
- Family: Stromerosuchidae
- Genus: †Stromerosuchus Kuhn, 1936

Binomial name
- †Stromerosuchus aegyptiacus Kuhn, 1936

Extinct genus of reptiles

Stromerosuchus (meaning "Ernst Stromer's crocodile") is a dubious genus of Late Cretaceous crocodyliform. Fragmentary remains have been found from the Cenomanian-age Bahariya Formation of Egypt.

== Discovery and naming ==
The holotype was collected by Ernst Stromer and Richard Markgraf in 1911 and along with many others found from Bahariya, were in the possession of the Egyptian Geological Survey. In 1922, the fossils were sent back to Stromer (who was in Germany at the time), but they were badly crushed in shipment from Egypt.

Stromerosuchus aegyptiacus was named in 1936 by Oskar Kuhn.

== Classification ==
Because the known remains are so poor, the genus is now regarded as a nomen dubium. Some material has been referred to the genera Aegyptosuchus and Stomatosuchus, both named by Stromer from the Bahariya material.

It was assigned first to Crocodylia by Kuhn (1964) and then to Stromerosuchidae by Kuhn (1966) before being moved into Aegyptosuchidae by Molnar (1989) and later Crocodyliformes.
