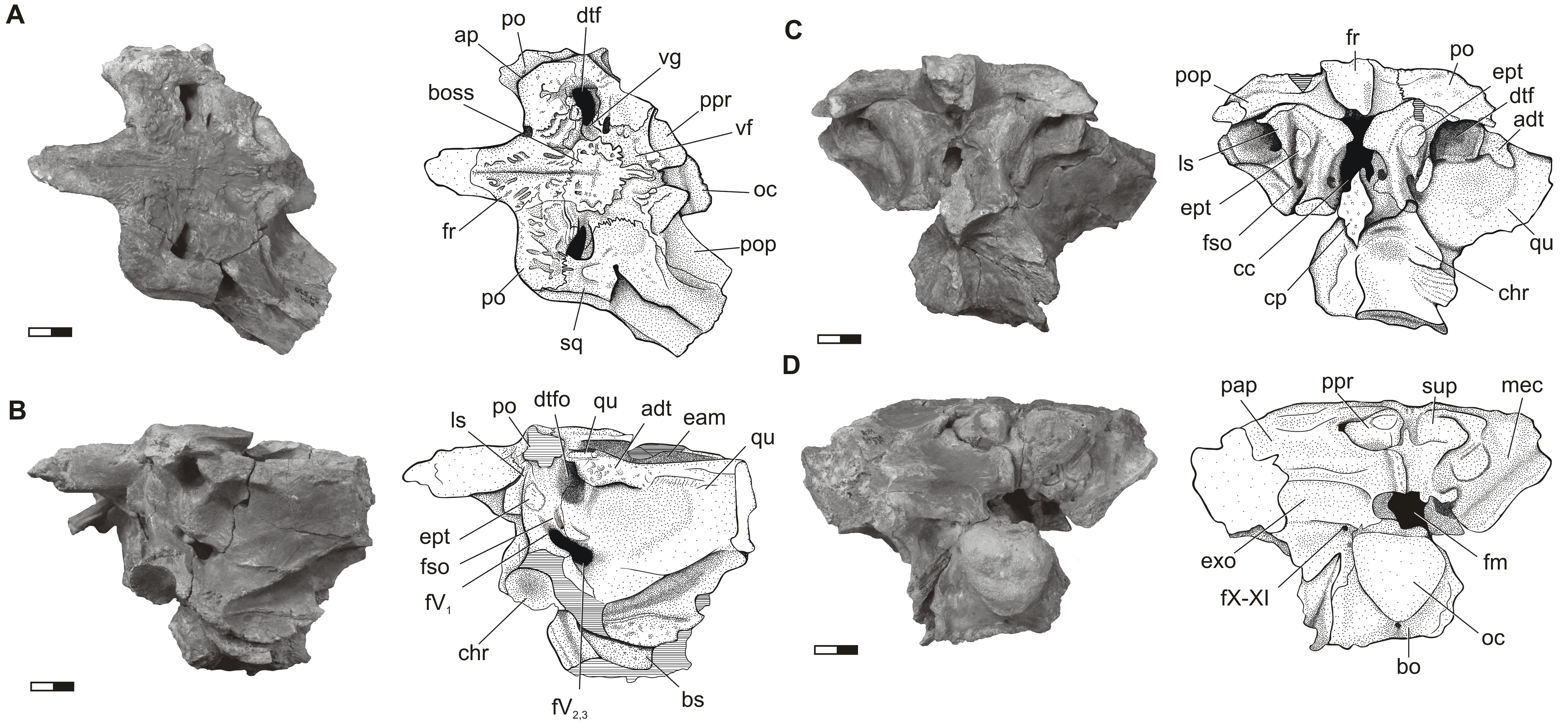
- Holotype braincase

Scientific classification
- Kingdom: Animalia
- Phylum: Chordata
- Class: Reptilia
- Clade: Pseudosuchia
- Clade: Crocodylomorpha
- Clade: Neosuchia
- Clade: Eusuchia
- Family: †Aegyptosuchidae
- Genus: †Aegisuchus; Holliday & Gardner, 2012

Type species
- †Aegisuchus witmeri Holliday & Gardner, 2012

= Aegisuchus =

Aegisuchus Temporal range: Late Cretaceous: Cenomanian, 98–93 Ma

Extinct genus of reptiles

Aegisuchus is an extinct monospecific genus of giant, flat-headed crocodyliform within the family Aegyptosuchidae. It was found in the Kem Kem Formation of southeast Morocco, which dates back to the Cenomanian age of the Late Cretaceous epoch. The type species Aegisuchus witmeri was named in 2012 by paleontologists Casey Holliday and Nicholas Gardner, who nicknamed it "Shieldcroc" for the shield-like shape of its skull. A. witmeri is known from a single partial skull including the braincase and skull roof.

== Description ==
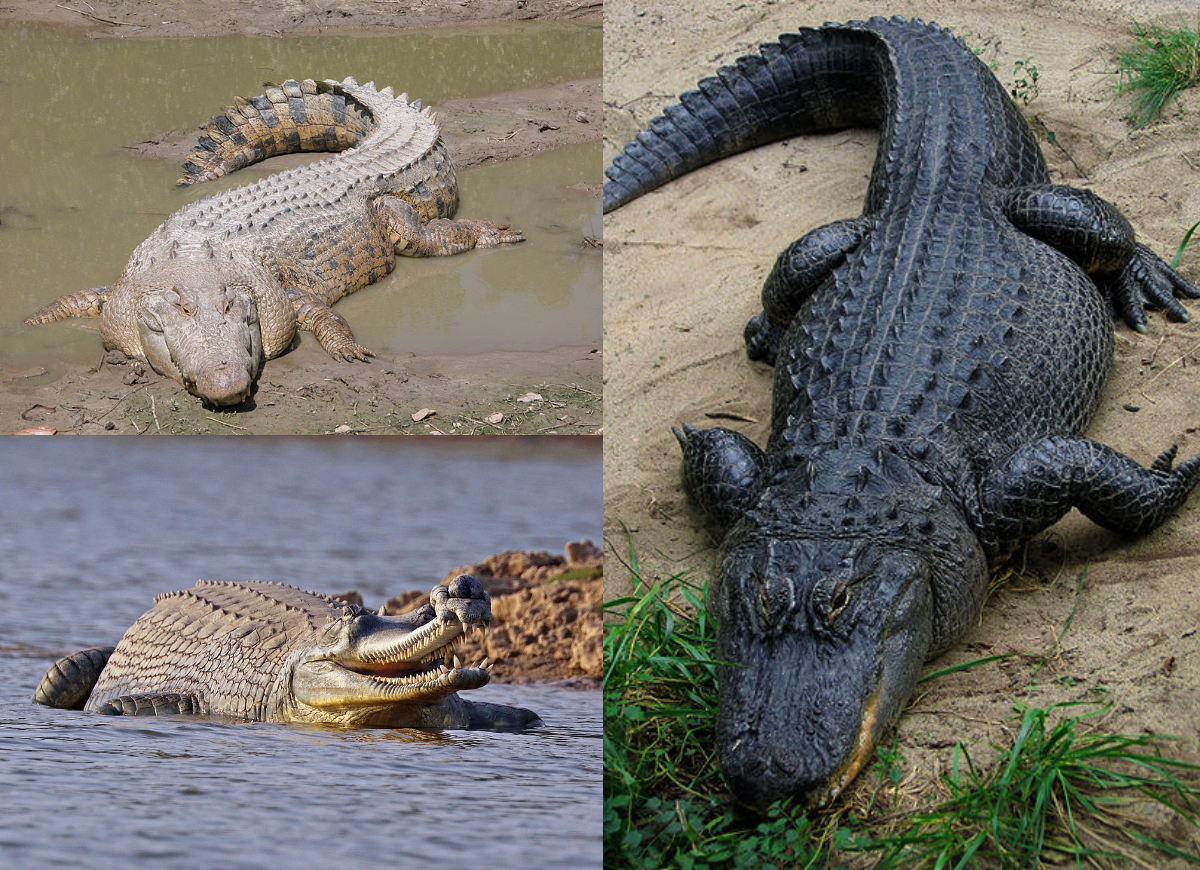
Modern crocodilians form the sister group to Aegisuchus and its family.

Aegisuchus is known only from a partial braincase and skull roof cataloged as ROM 54530. It is diagnosed by several autapomorphies, or unique features. At the center of the skull table is a raised and rough-surfaced boss on the parietal bone that is shaped like a circle. On either side of this boss are holes called dorsotemporal fenestrae, and the surrounding bone is relatively smooth. The quadrate bone in the temporal region of the skull has a rectangular projection called the adductor tubercle, which served as an attachment for muscles that closed the jaw. At the front of the skull table, projections on the laterosphenoid bones called capitate processes face out to the side. This feature is also seen in the skulls of living gharials, but evolved independently in each group. Also on the front surface are two holes of the dorsotemporal fenestrae, which pass through the skull and open at the skull table. On the front surface, a ridge of bone or torus makes up the lateral edge of each hole. The back of the skull is wide, with large projections on the exoccipital bones that would have anchored large epaxial muscles in the top part of the neck.

=== Size ===
At 40 cubic centimetres, the braincase of Aegisuchus is much larger in volume than that of any other crocodyliform. Original description in 2012, the total skull length of Aegisuchus is estimated to have been 2.08 to 2.86 metres (6.8 to 9.4 ft) in length, based on the ratio of braincase to skull length in other crocodilians. A similar ratio between braincase and body length puts Aegisuchus at 15 to 21 metres (49 to 69 ft) long when based on the proportions of long-snouted gharials, or 16 to 22 metres (52 to 72 ft) long when based on the proportions of short-snouted crocodiles. However, these proportions have been met with a lot of scrutiny, and it is more likely that Aegisuchus reached less than 15 metres (49 ft) in length. A reader comment posted to the original description provided regression equations failed to replicate the reported skull length, suggesting actual skull length can be 62 to 90 centimetres (2.03 to 2.95 ft) long, and total length would be around 3.9 metres (13 ft).

=== Integument ===
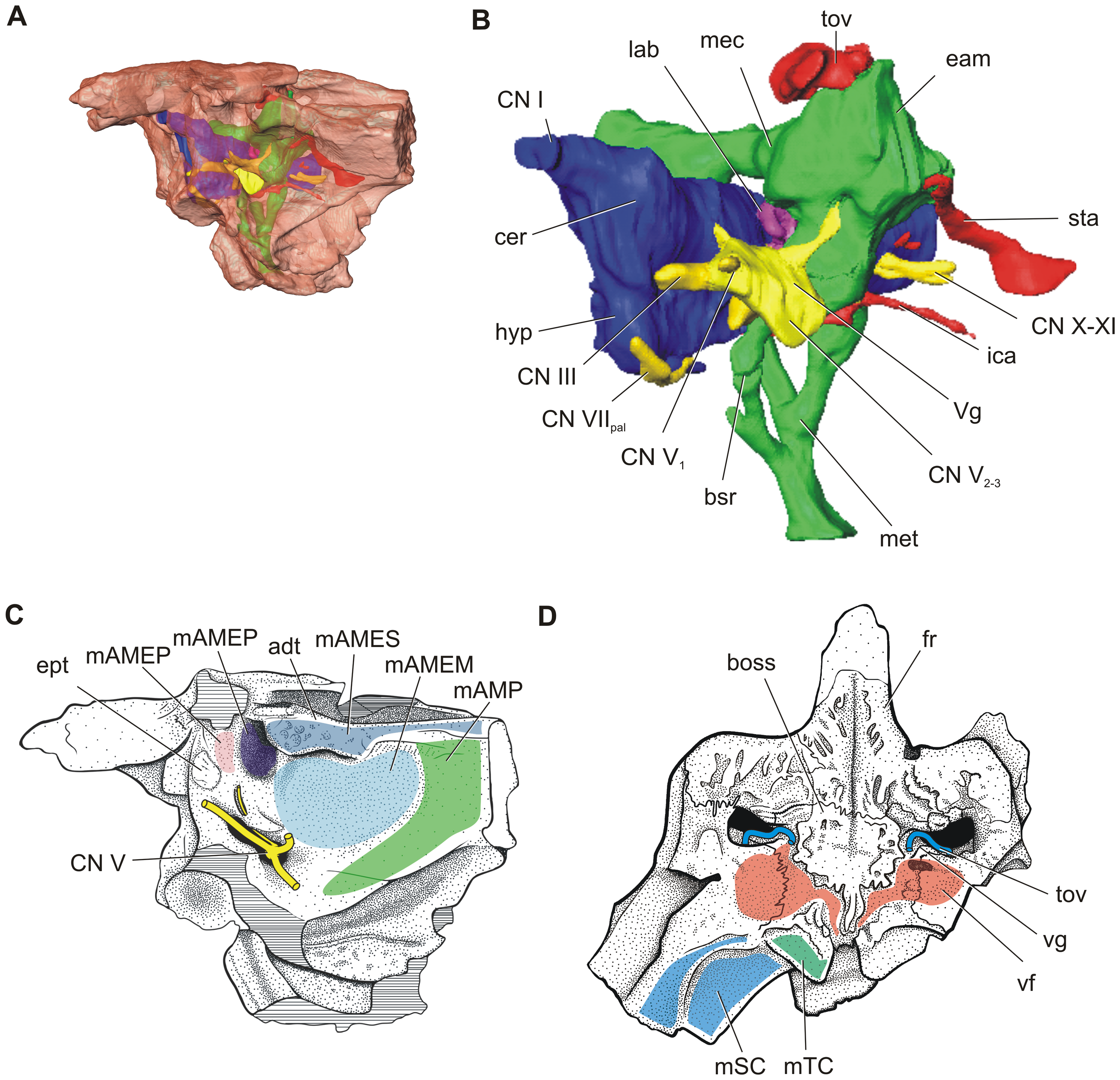
3D restoration of the holotype including an endocast of the brain

The circular boss of roughened bone on the skull table is one of the most unusual features of Aegisuchus. As in most crocodilians, the rough-surfaced region was probably covered in a thick skin that tightly adhered to the skull. Surrounding the boss, the smooth-surfaced region bears several deep parallel channels for blood vessels, suggesting that thicker, more complex skin tissue covered this region. Vascularization is not seen in any other crocodilian, and may have been unique to Aegisuchus. Given that the blood vessel channels run into the braincase, the vascularized tissue may have served a thermoregulatory role by heating blood going to the brain and eyes. The central boss may have been used in mating displays, appearing as an eyespot. Modern crocodilians raise their heads out of the water as a social signal in mating displays; as a close relative of crocodilians, Aegisuchus likely had similar mating rituals.

=== Musculature ===
The flattened shape of the skull of Aegisuchus suggests that it was an ambush predator resting at the surface of the water. Although only the back of the skull is known, other characteristics can be inferred from the closely related Aegyptosuchus. Aegisuchus probably had eyes that faced directly upward, with no raised ridges surrounding the sockets. A strut of bone called the postorbital bar, which in most crocodilians is vertically oriented, would have been almost flat. The flattened skull of Aegisuchus required significant alteration to jaw muscles. The adductor muscles that close the jaw shifted to a more vertical orientation in Aegisuchus. Muscles like the adductor mandibulae externus medialis, which are weak in most crocodilians, became more important as jaw closers and were greatly enlarged. The broad-surfaced occipital region at the back of the skull provides a large attachment area for the splenius capitis muscles of the neck. With a long flattened snout, Aegisuchus would have had great difficulty in raising its head and opening its mouth if it did not have large neck muscles. A depressed region in the lower part of the back of the skull suggests that the jaw adductor muscles were also large, facilitating jaw opening. A similar mechanism for lifting the head and opening the jaws is seen in the Late Triassic amphibian Gerrothorax. Aegisuchus has a very flexible articulation between the skull and vertebral column, allowing a greater degree of skull elevation than other crocodilians.

== Classification ==
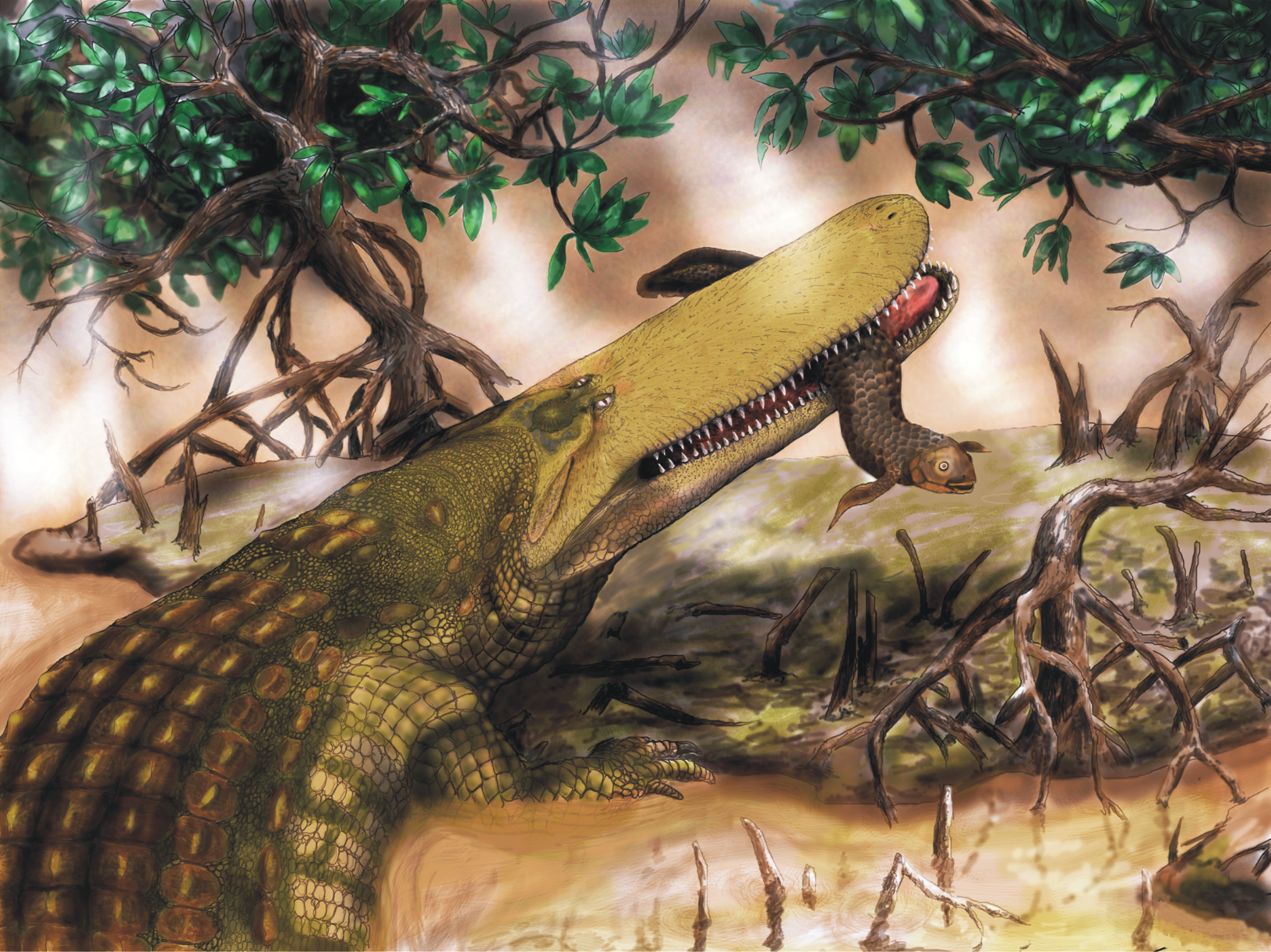
Restoration based on earlier stomatosuchid identification

Aegisuchus is a member of the family Aegyptosuchidae, along with the genus Aegyptosuchus. Aegyptosuchidae belongs to the clade Eusuchia, and is proposed to be the sister clade to the crown group Crocodylia, which contains all extant (living) crocodilians. The phylogeny can be shown in the cladogram below:

- Neosuchia
  - Theriosuchus
  - - Goniopholis
    - - Bernissartia
      - Eusuchia
        - Isisfordia
        - - Hylaeochampsa
          - - Crocodylia
              - Gavialoidea
              - Borealosuchus
              - - - Leidyosuchus
                  - Crocodyloidea
                - Alligatoroidea
            - Aegyptosuchidae
              - Aegyptosuchus
              - Aegisuchus

== Paleoenvironment ==
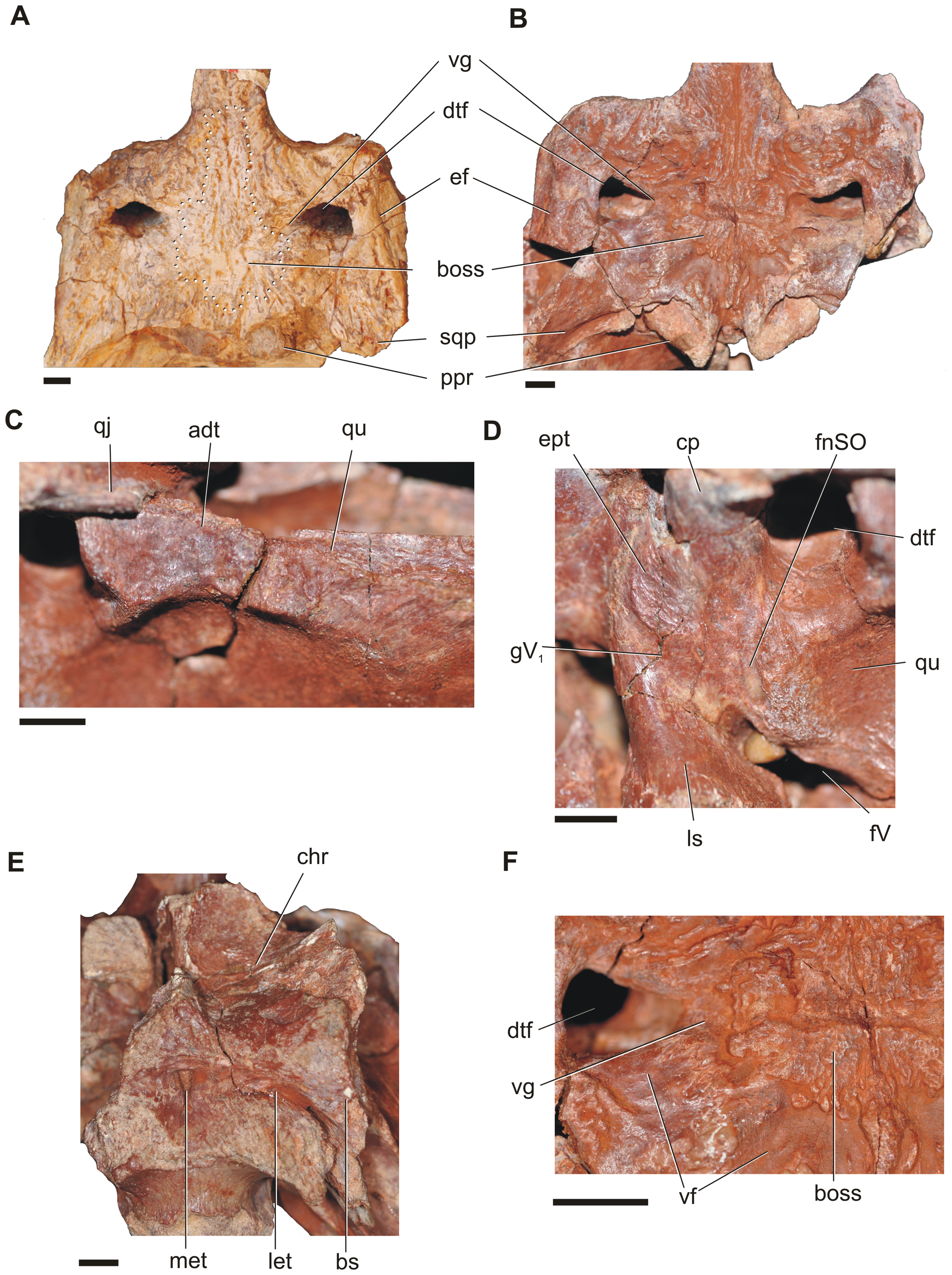
Comparison with Aegyptosuchus

During the Late Cretaceous, northern Africa was a humid region near the Tethys Ocean, a seaway between the southern continents of Gondwana and northern land masses of Laurasia. At this time, the Kem Kem Beds of Morocco were deposited in a freshwater delta system. Aegisuchus lived within this delta alongside fishes, turtles, snakes and varanid lizards, pterosaurs, and sauropod and theropod dinosaurs. Stomatosuchids are also known from the Kem Kem Beds, and probably shared a close ecological niche with Aegisuchus as river predators.

With its flattened skull, Aegisuchus was probably an ambush predator. Possible prey include coelacanths, lungfish, and bichirs, all of which have been found in the Kem Kem beds. As an opportunistic predator, Aegisuchus may also have preyed on terrestrial vertebrates such as Alanqa. Aegisuchus could have potentially fallen prey to much larger predators such as Spinosaurus.

=== Biogeography ===
The Late Cretaceous was an important time in crocodilian evolution because many land masses were breaking up. What is now Europe and Asia was drifting away from Africa to form the Tethys Ocean, while North America continued to separate from the rest of Laurasia as the Atlantic Ocean widened. With the presence of several early crocodilians like Borealosuchus, North America is often hypothesized as the continent of origin for Crocodylia. However, the presence of aegyptosuchids such as Aegisuchus in northern Africa suggests that early crocodilian evolution was focused instead around the Tethys Ocean. The aegyptosuchids represent a highly specialized and highly endemic branch of crocodyliforms at a time when crocodilian diversity and geographic range were expanding.
