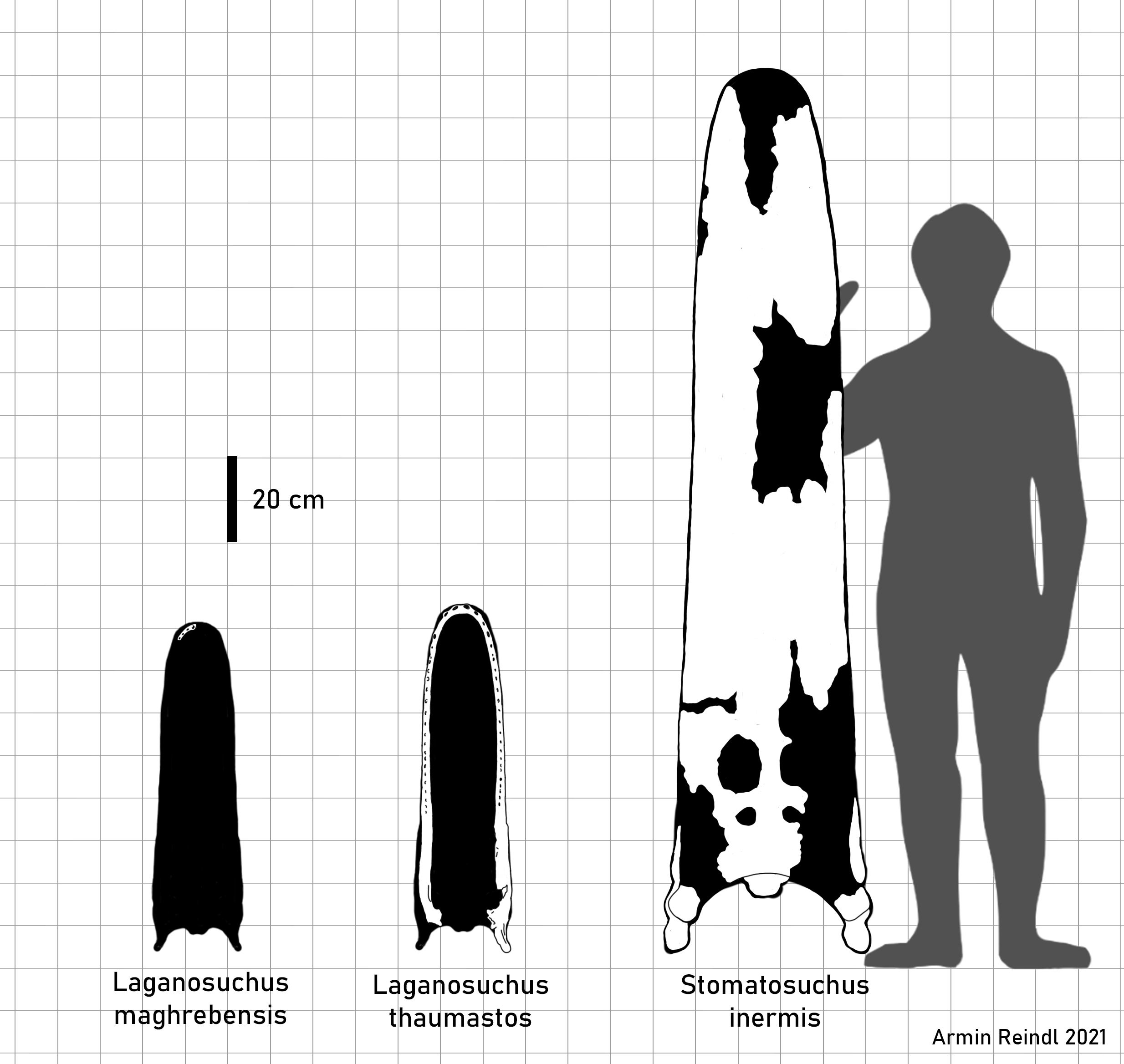
- Skull material of the three known stomatosuchids

Scientific classification
- Kingdom: Animalia
- Phylum: Chordata
- Class: Reptilia
- Clade: Archosauria
- Clade: Pseudosuchia
- Clade: Crocodylomorpha
- Clade: Neosuchia
- Family: †Stomatosuchidae; Stromer, 1925

Genera
- †Chiayusuchus?; †Laganosuchus; †Stomatosuchus

= Stomatosuchidae =

Stomatosuchids Temporal range: Late Cretaceous, 100–95 Ma Cenomanian

Extinct family of reptiles

Stomatosuchidae is an extinct family of neosuchian crocodylomorphs. It is defined as the most inclusive clade containing Stomatosuchus inermis but not Notosuchus terrestris, Simosuchus clarki, Araripesuchus gomesii, Baurusuchus pachecoi, Peirosaurus torminni, or Crocodylus niloticus. Two genera are known to belong to Stomatosuchidae: Stomatosuchus, the type genus, and Laganosuchus. Fossils have been found from Egypt, Morocco, and Niger. Both lived during the Cenomanian stage of the Late Cretaceous. The skulls of stomatosuchids are said to be platyrostral because they have unusually flattened, elongate, duck-shaped craniums with U-shaped jaws. This platyrostral condition is similar to what is seen in the "nettosuchid" Mourasuchus, which is not closely related to stomatosuchids as it is a more derived alligatoroid that existed during the Miocene.

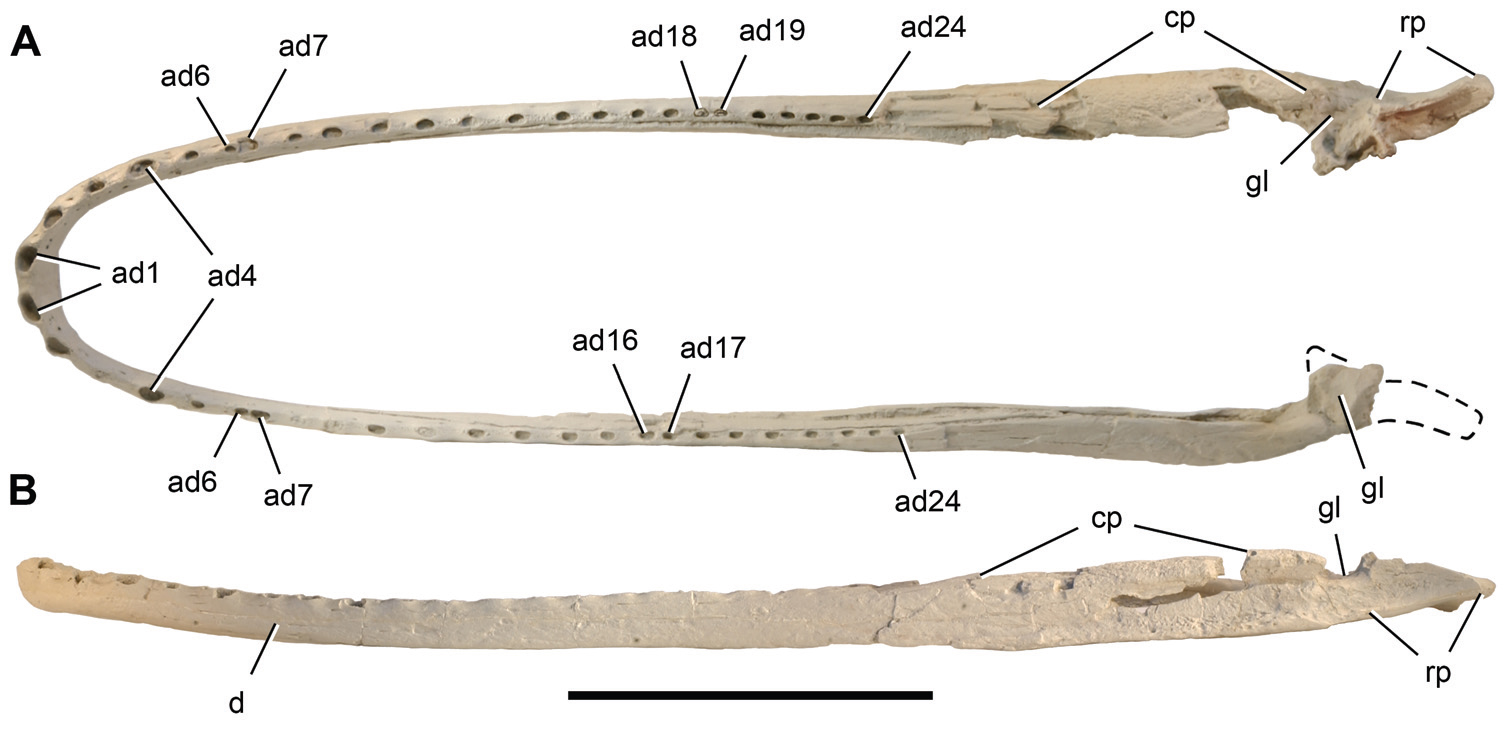
Lower jaws of Laganosuchus thaumastos

Unlike Mourasuchus, stomatosuchids have jaws that are less strongly bowed. Additionally, the glenoid is rounded rather than cupped at the posterior end of the jaw, and the retroarticular process is straight rather than dorsally curving like in Mourasuchus and other extant crocodylians.

The only existing specimens of stomatosuchids belong to the recently described genus Laganosuchus, which is known from two species, L. thaumastos and L. maghrebensis from the Echkar Formation in Niger and the Kem Kem Beds in Morocco, respectively. The genus Stomatosuchus is known only from a holotype skull collected from the Bahariya Formation in Egypt, which was destroyed in World War II with the bombing of the Munich Museum. Because Stomatosuchus is known only from brief accounts by Ernst Stromer and Franz Nopcsa (1926) and no additional material has ever been found, the genus remains enigmatic.

The genus Aegyptosuchus was once considered to be a member of Stomatosuchidae, but it is now placed within its own family, Aegyptosuchidae.
