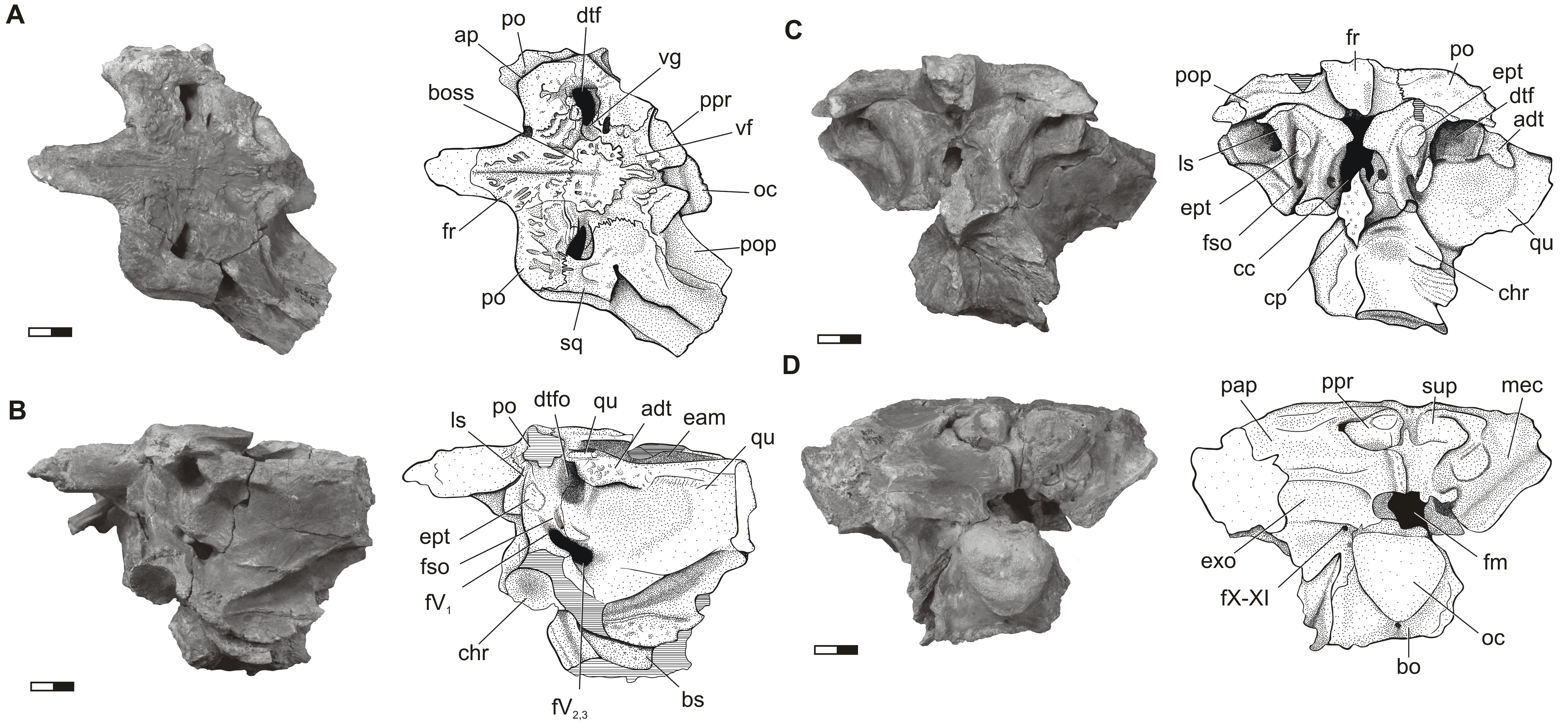
- Skull of Aegisuchus witmeri

Scientific classification
- Kingdom: Animalia
- Phylum: Chordata
- Class: Reptilia
- Clade: Archosauria
- Clade: Pseudosuchia
- Clade: Crocodylomorpha
- Clade: Neosuchia
- Clade: Eusuchia
- Family: †Aegyptosuchidae; Kuhn, 1936

Genera
- †Aegisuchus; †Aegyptosuchus (type genus)

= Aegyptosuchidae =

Aegyptosuchidae Temporal range: Late Cretaceous: Cenomanian, 100.5–93.9 Ma

Extinct family of reptiles

Aegyptosuchidae is an extinct family of eusuchian crocodyliforms from the Cretaceous period of Africa. They are characterized by their large size and flat heads. The family includes two genera, Aegyptosuchus and Aegisuchus.

Aegyptosuchidae was originally established as the monotypic family name for Aegyptosuchus peyeri in 1933. Upon the discovery of the fellow aegyptosuchid Aegisuchus witmeri in 2012 by Holliday and Gardner, Aegyptosuchidae was phylogenetically defined as the least inclusive clade containing Aegisuchus witmeri and Aegyptosuchus peyeri, so long as it does not include Alligator mississippiensis (American alligator), Bernissartia fagesii, Crocodylus niloticus (Nile crocodile), Gavialis gangeticus (gharial), Hylaeochampsa vectiana, or Susisuchus anatoceps.

Aegyptosuchidae belongs to the clade Eusuchia, and is proposed to be the sister clade to the crown group Crocodylia, which contains all extant (living) crocodilians. The phylogeny can be shown in the cladogram below:

- Neosuchia
  - Theriosuchus
  - - Goniopholis
    - - Bernissartia
      - Eusuchia
        - Isisfordia
        - - Hylaeochampsa
          - - Crocodylia
              - Gavialoidea
              - Borealosuchus
              - - - Leidyosuchus
                  - Crocodyloidea
                - Alligatoroidea
            - Aegyptosuchidae
              - Aegyptosuchus
              - Aegisuchus
