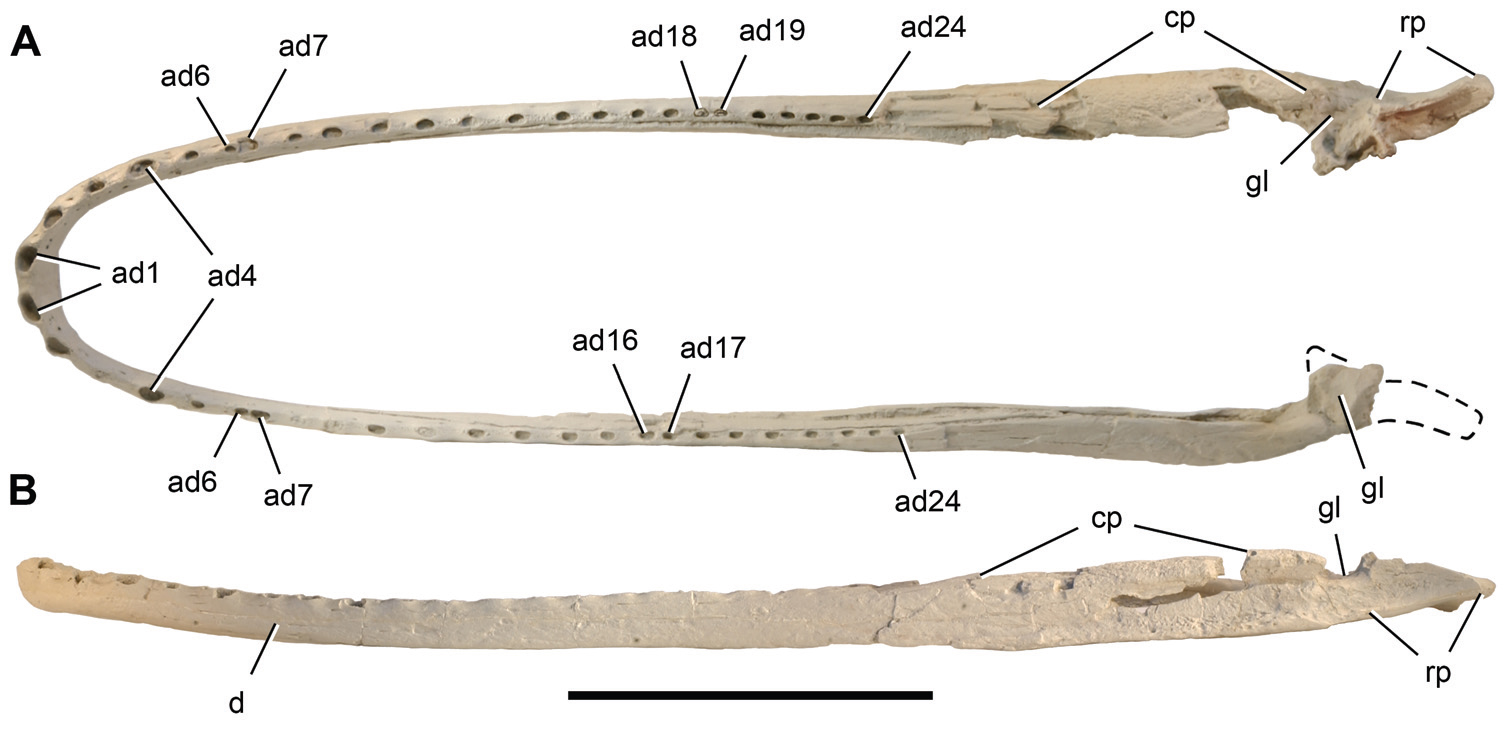
- Lower jaws of L. thaumastos

Scientific classification
- Domain: Eukaryota
- Kingdom: Animalia
- Phylum: Chordata
- Class: Reptilia
- Clade: Archosauria
- Clade: Pseudosuchia
- Clade: Crocodylomorpha
- Family: †Stomatosuchidae
- Genus: †Laganosuchus; Sereno and Larsson, 2009

Type species
- †Laganosuchus thaumastos Sereno and Larsson, 2009

Other species
- †L. maghrebensis Sereno and Larsson, 2009

= Laganosuchus =

Laganosuchus Temporal range: Late Cretaceous, 95 Ma Cenomanian

Extinct genus of reptiles

Laganosuchus is an extinct genus of stomatosuchid crocodyliform. Fossils have been found from Niger and Morocco and date back to the Upper Cretaceous.

== Discovery ==
The name means "pancake crocodile" from the Greek λαγανον, laganon ("pancake") and σοῦχος, souchos ("crocodile") in reference to the shallow depth of the skull, which is characteristic of all stomatosuchids. It has been nicknamed "PancakeCroc" by Paul Sereno and Hans Larsson, who first described the genus in a monograph published in ZooKeys in 2009 along with other Saharan crocodyliformes such as Anatosuchus and Kaprosuchus.

The type species is L. thaumastos (meaning 'the astonishing pancake crocodile' from Greek θαυμαζω, thaumazo "I astonish" in reference to its unusual form) from the Cenomanian-age Echkar Formation in Niger, holotype MNN IGU13. A second species, L. maghrebensis (making a reference to the place of discovery), is known from the Kem Kem Beds in Morocco, which are also Cenomanian in age; its holotype is UCRC PV2.

== Description ==
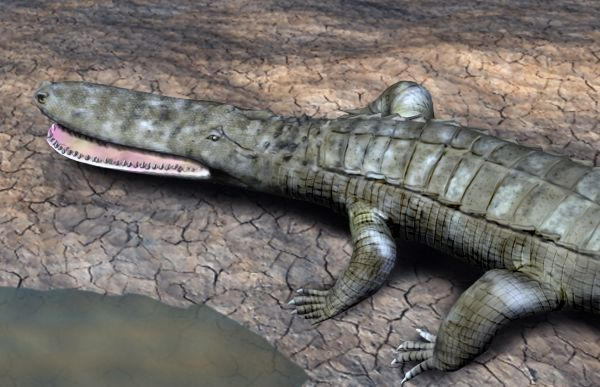
Life restoration of L. thaumastos

Both species of Laganosuchus are known only from their lower jaws, those of L. thaumastos almost complete save for the left retroarticular process and those of L. maghrebensis only from a fragment of the dentary bone. L. thaumastos had a total jaw length of 838 mm and a jaw length from tip to articular facet of 750 mm, of which 490 mm actually bore teeth. Across the jaws, the total width of the lower jaw ranged from around 140 mm at the symphysis to 240 mm at the articular facets, widening fairly evenly all the way along. All the teeth were simple straight spikes, with the first pair the largest and the rest of the teeth decreasing in size towards the back of the mouth. Each side of the mouth bore 24 teeth, relatively evenly spaced save for the sixth and seventh, the dental alveoli of which have merged. Each side of these jaws is gently bowed outwards horizontally, curving more strongly towards the symphysis of the two dentary bones from the seventh alveolus forwards. The symphysis itself is relatively small and weak compared to other crocodyliforms, suggesting a very weak bite, although the bones are fully fused. The jaws are also bowed slightly, curving downwards from the articular facet and then back upwards to the symphysis of the jaws. Each of the dentary bones is very slender, only about 22 mm wide even at the slightly thickened 'chin' of the symphysis. While L. thaumastos has a small crest running along the lingual side of the dentary to thicken it, this feature is not present in L. maghrebensis. The splenial is a very thin sheet of bone in both species; it stretches much of the way along the lower jaws, but does not participate in the symphysis as the dentary does. The anterior end of the splenial differs between the two species; in L. thaumastos it is bifurcated, whereas in L. maghrebensis the anterior end of the splenial comes to a simple point.

Although the posterior end of the lower jaw is not preserved in L. maghrebensis, in L. thaumastos the coronoid process is rugose, low and broad transversely, thickened by the surangular on the lingual side of the jaw, possibly signifying the attachment of powerful muscles to close the long, heavy jaws - a task that would be difficult underwater due to the large surface area between them. The external mandibular fenestra is very much reduced, forming little more than a slit. There is an unusually small adductor fossa just in front of the saddle-shaped articular facet of the glenoid; on the right side this saddle-shaped facet has irregular edges and shows some signs of bone disease, for unknown reasons. The retroarticular process is triangular in cross-section with slightly concave sides. Both the angular and the prearticular bones have thin posterior rami that entirely overlap the articular laterally and medially, leaving only the top and bottom faces of the articular open.

L. thaumastos has the first two teeth in each dentary tilted forwards, and these would probably have projected out from the mouth below matching teeth in the premaxilla. Between each alveolus, the dorsal margin of the alveolar row forms a ridge that slopes downwards labially in concave depressions between the alveoli, probably indicating strongly interdigitating teeth that fitted together to form a kind of 'fish trap'. Most of the teeth are broken or missing, but a few were being replaced when the specimen died and have so been preserved in their crypts; they are straight, perfectly symmetrical spikes with no ornamentation, carinae or recurvature. In L. maghrebensis, however, the fourth tooth in the dentary is slightly larger than the first and there is no procumbency of the first dental alveoli, so its front teeth would not have projected forwards in the same fashion.

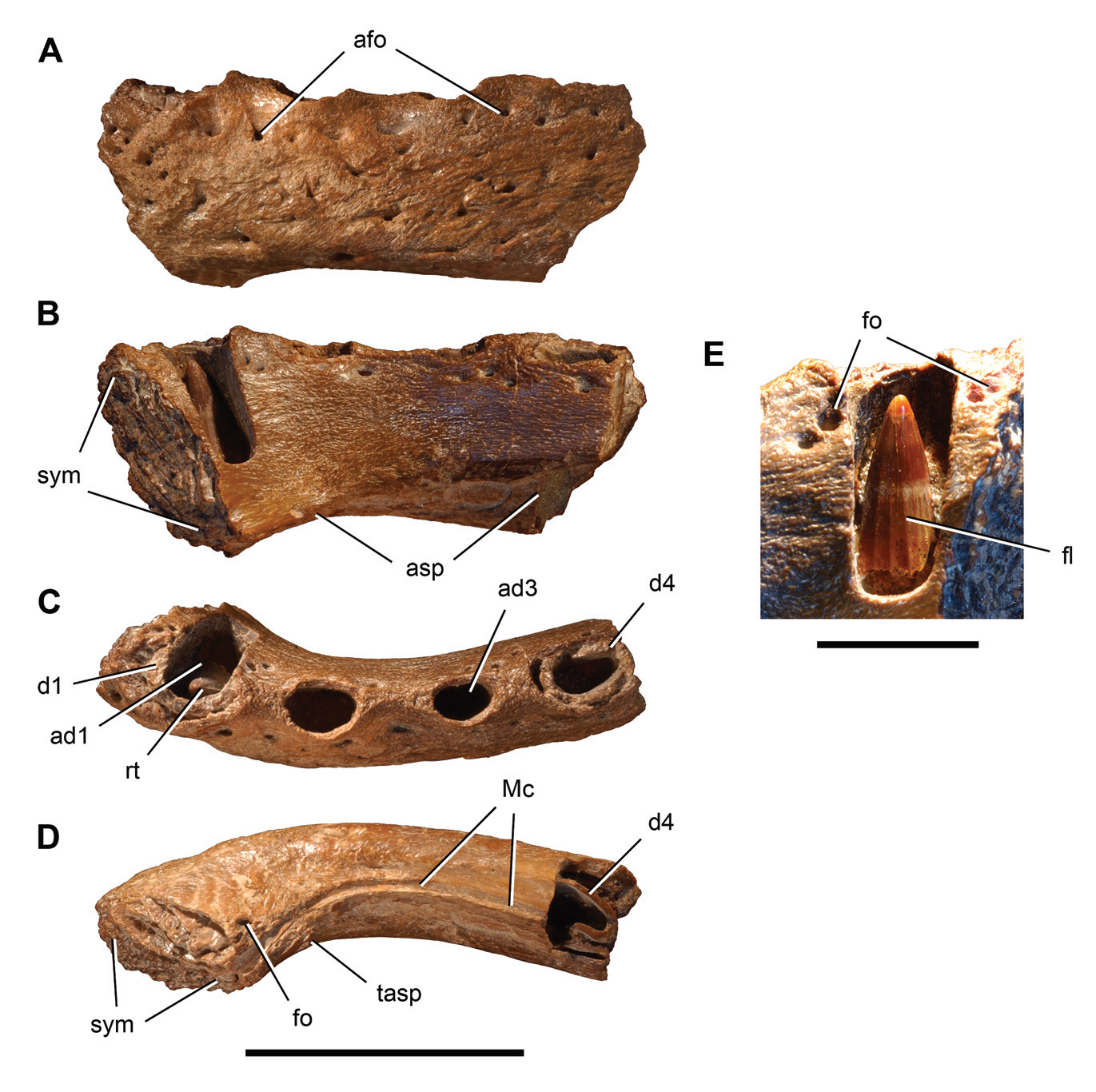
Holotype dentary of L. maghrebensis

Both species of Laganosuchus would have been between 4–6 metres (13–20 ft) in total length, a comparatively large proportion of which would have been the large flattened head. It is possible that they had gular sacs beneath their throats, just as their relative Stomatosuchus may have done, but there is no fossil evidence either to support or disprove this theory. The jaws would have been unable to be opened or closed at speed or with much power due to their length relative to all the possible muscles that could be used to close them.

== Paleobiology ==
According to Sereno and Larsson, L. thaumastos was an approximately 6 m (20 ft) long, squat fish-eater with a 1 m (3.3 ft) flat head. It would have stayed motionless for hours, waiting for prey to swim into its open jaws with spike-shaped teeth. These teeth would have fitted together tightly so that no fish trapped in the mouth could escape.
