= Bahariya Formation =

Fossiliferous beds in North Africa

Coordinates: 28°24′20″N 28°48′20″E

- Stratigraphic range: Late Cretaceous (Cenomanian); ~100–95 Ma
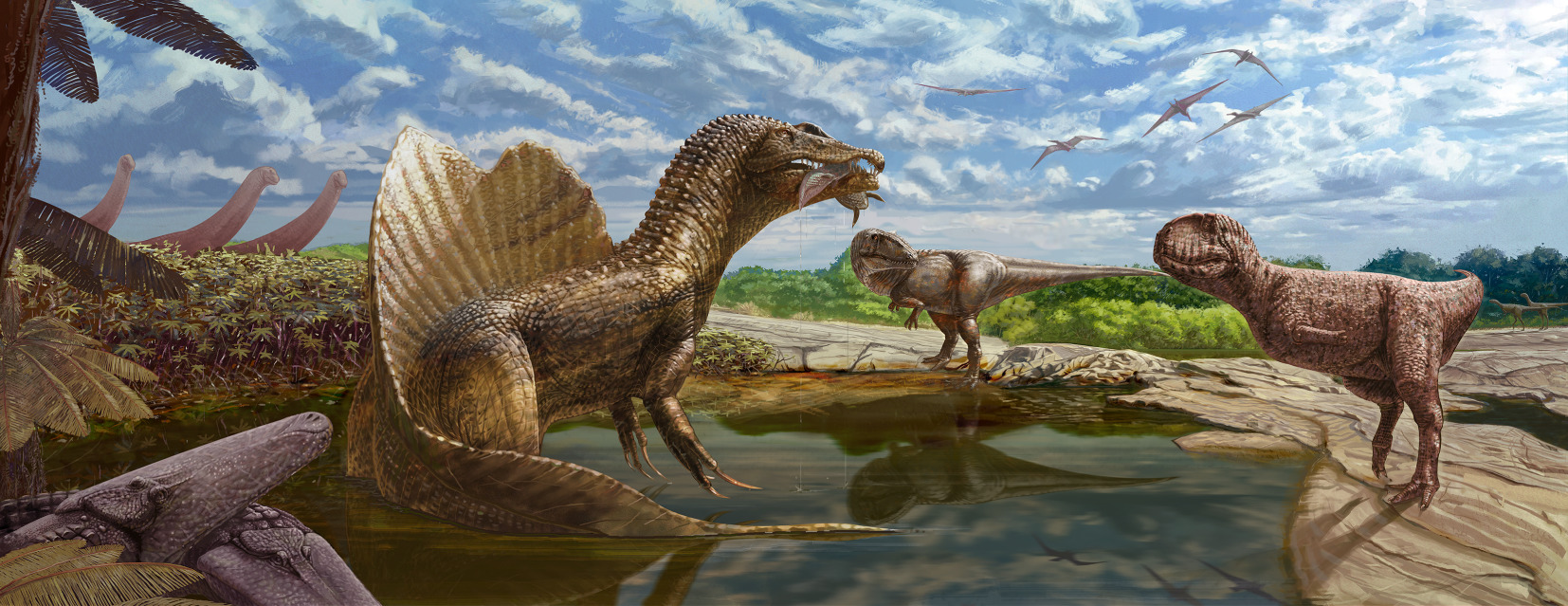
- Restoration of the environment and animals of the formation
- Type: Geological formation
- Underlies: El Heiz Fm., El Naqb Fm.
- Overlies: Basement
- Thickness: ≈100 m (330 ft)

Lithology
- Primary: Sandstone
- Other: Mudstone, siltstone

Location
- Region: Western Desert
- Country: Egypt

Type section
- Named for: Bahariya Oasis
- Named by: Said
- Year defined: 1962
- Bahariya Formation (Egypt)

The Bahariya Formation (also transcribed as Baharija Formation) is a fossiliferous geologic formation dating back to the early Cenomanian, which outcrops within the Bahariya depression in Egypt, and is known from oil exploration drilling across much of the Western Desert where it forms an important oil reservoir.

== Extent ==
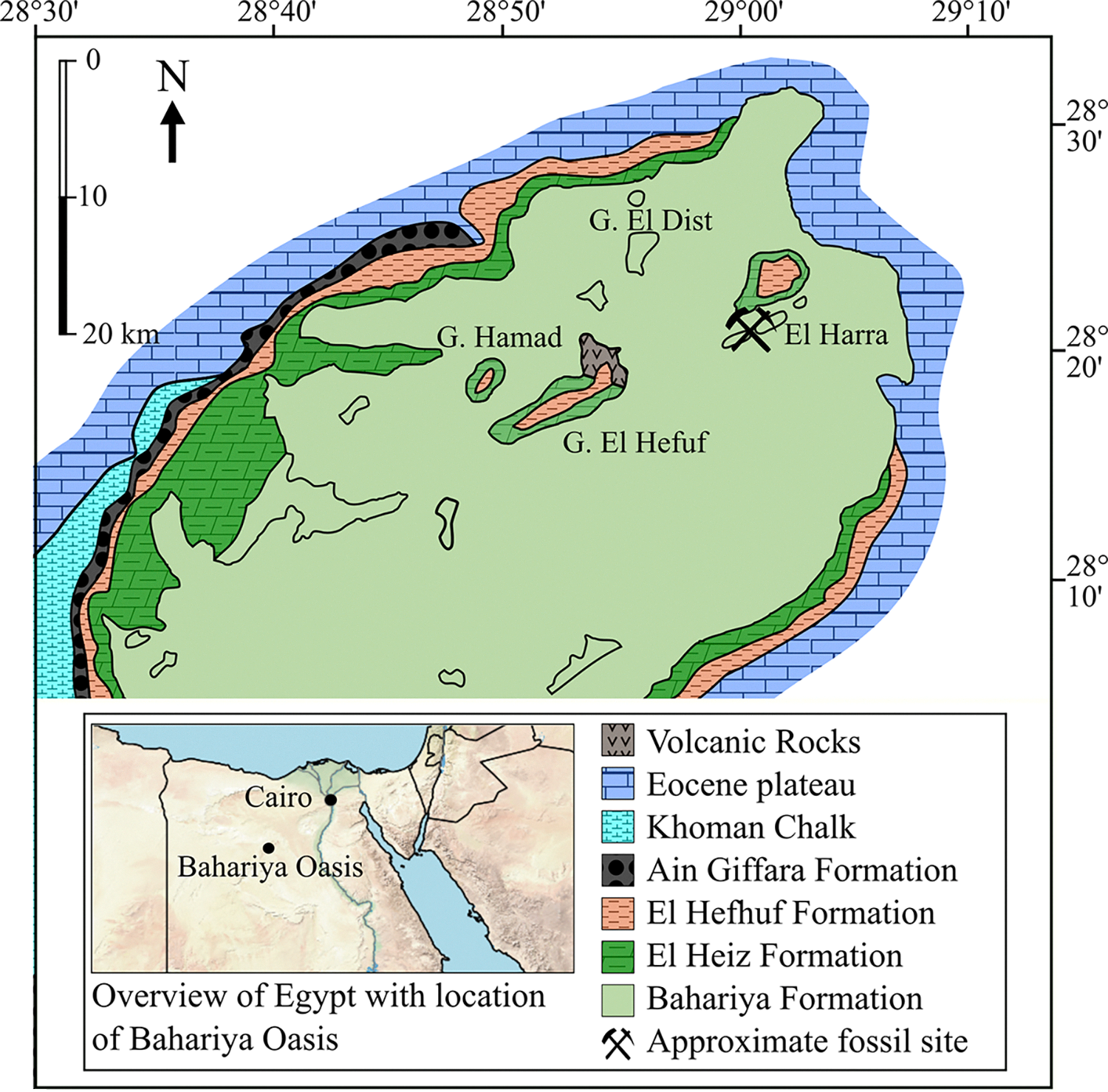
Geological map

The Bahariya Formation forms the base of the depression, the lower part of the enclosing escarpment and all of the small hills within. The type section for the formation is found at Gebel El-Dist, a hill at the northern end of the Bahariya depression.

== Stratigraphy and sedimentology ==
Four depositional sequences have been recognised in the Bahariya Formation in the Bahariya depression, separated by three sub-aerial unconformities. The formation was deposited during a period of relative rise in sea level, with each unconformity representing a relative fall in sea level. Each of the individual sequences contains sediments deposited under fluvial, shoreline and shallow marine conditions.

== Microfauna and Meiofauna ==
=== Foraminifera ===
Foraminifera of the Bahariya Formation
Genus	Species
Charentia	C. cuvillieri
Favusella	F. washitensis
Mayncina	M. orbignyi
Rotalipora	R. cushmani R. reicheli
Thomasinella	T. aegyptia T. fragmentaria T. punica
Whiteinella	W. archaeocretacea

=== Other microorganisms ===
Other microorganisms of the Bahariya Formation
Genus	Species	Images
Botryococcus		Botryococcus Pediastrum Scenedesmus
Coronifera	C. oceanica	Botryococcus Pediastrum Scenedesmus
Cyclonephelium	C. edwardsii C. vannophorum	Botryococcus Pediastrum Scenedesmus
Dynopterigium	D. cladoides	Botryococcus Pediastrum Scenedesmus
Exochosphaeridium		Botryococcus Pediastrum Scenedesmus
Florentinia	F. cooksoniae F. mantlii	Botryococcus Pediastrum Scenedesmus
Kallosphaeridium		Botryococcus Pediastrum Scenedesmus
Mudrongia	M. simplex	Botryococcus Pediastrum Scenedesmus
Palaeoperidinium	P. cretaceum	Botryococcus Pediastrum Scenedesmus
Pediastrum		Botryococcus Pediastrum Scenedesmus
Pseudoceratium	P. anaphrisum P. securigerum	Botryococcus Pediastrum Scenedesmus
Scenedesmus		Botryococcus Pediastrum Scenedesmus
Spiniferites		Botryococcus Pediastrum Scenedesmus
Subtilisphaera	S. perlucida S. senegalensis	Botryococcus Pediastrum Scenedesmus
Xiphophoridium	X. alatum	Botryococcus Pediastrum Scenedesmus

== Invertebrates ==
=== Molluscs ===
Molluscs of the Bahariya Formation
Genus	Species	Notes	Images
Baculites		A heteromorph ammonite with a nearly straight shell.	Baculites.
Cardium		A cockle.	Baculites.
Exogyra		A reef-forming true oyster associated with solid substrates and warm temperatures.	Baculites.
Gastrochaena		A saltwater clam.	Baculites.
Neolobites	N. vibrayeanus	A typical rolled ammonite.	Baculites.
Nucula		A small saltwater clam.	Baculites.
Ostrea	O. flabeata	An edible oyster.	Baculites.

=== Crustaceans (Ostracoda) ===
Crustaceans of the Bahariya Formation
Genus	Species	Notes	Images
Amphicytherura	A. sexta		
Anticythereis	A. gaensis		
Bairdia	B. bassiounii B. elongata		
Brachycythere	B. ledaforma porosa		
Bythoceratina	B. avnonensis B. tamarae		
Bythocypris	B. eskeri		
Cythereis	C. algeriana C. bicornis levis C. canteriolata		
Cytherella	C. ovata C. paenovata C. parallela C. sulcata		
Fabanella			
Looneyella	L. sohni		
Loxoconcha	L. clinocosta L. fletcheri		
Metacytheropteron	M. berbericum		
Ovocytheridea	O. caudata O. producta O. reniformis		
Paracypris	P. acutocaudata P. angusta P. mdaouerensis P. triangularis		
Pterygocythere	P. raabi		
Veeniacythereis	V. jezzineensis		
Xestoleberis	X. obesa		

=== Insects ===
Direct fossils are sparse, though plant leaves with extensive damage from folivorous insects have been documented.

== Vertebrates ==
=== Cartilaginous fish ===
Color key: Taxon / Reclassified taxon / Taxon falsely reported as present / Dubious taxon or junior synonym / Ichnotaxon / Ootaxon / Morphotaxon	Notes; Uncertain or tentative taxa are in small text; ~~crossed out~~ taxa are discredited.

Chondrichthyes of the Bahariya Formation
Genus	Species	Abundance	Notes	Images
Aegyptobatus	A. kuehnei		A sclerorhynchiform.	Modern Gymnura. Onchopristis tooth. Modern Rhinoptera. Scapanorhynchus Squalicorax Modern Squatina.
Asteracanthus	A. aegyptiacus		A hybodont shark.	Modern Gymnura. Onchopristis tooth. Modern Rhinoptera. Scapanorhynchus Squalicorax Modern Squatina.
Baharipristis	B. bastetiae		A sclerorhynchiform.	Modern Gymnura. Onchopristis tooth. Modern Rhinoptera. Scapanorhynchus Squalicorax Modern Squatina.
Cretodus	C. longiplicatus		A shark.	Modern Gymnura. Onchopristis tooth. Modern Rhinoptera. Scapanorhynchus Squalicorax Modern Squatina.
Cretolamna	C. appendiculata		A mackerel shark.	Modern Gymnura. Onchopristis tooth. Modern Rhinoptera. Scapanorhynchus Squalicorax Modern Squatina.
Distobatus	D. nutiae		A sclerorhynchiform.	Modern Gymnura. Onchopristis tooth. Modern Rhinoptera. Scapanorhynchus Squalicorax Modern Squatina.
Gymnura	G. laterialata		A butterfly ray.	Modern Gymnura. Onchopristis tooth. Modern Rhinoptera. Scapanorhynchus Squalicorax Modern Squatina.
Haimirichia	H. amonensis		A shark previously classified in the genera Odontaspis, Serratolamna, and Carcharias.	Modern Gymnura. Onchopristis tooth. Modern Rhinoptera. Scapanorhynchus Squalicorax Modern Squatina.
Isidobatus	I. tricarinatus		A sclerorhynchiform.	Modern Gymnura. Onchopristis tooth. Modern Rhinoptera. Scapanorhynchus Squalicorax Modern Squatina.
Marckgrafia	M. lybica		A sclerorhynchiform.	Modern Gymnura. Onchopristis tooth. Modern Rhinoptera. Scapanorhynchus Squalicorax Modern Squatina.
Onchopristis	O. numida	One complete cranium and associated vertebrae.	A sclerorhynchid rajoid.	Modern Gymnura. Onchopristis tooth. Modern Rhinoptera. Scapanorhynchus Squalicorax Modern Squatina.
Peyeria	P. libyca		A sclerorhynchiform.	Modern Gymnura. Onchopristis tooth. Modern Rhinoptera. Scapanorhynchus Squalicorax Modern Squatina.
Ptychotrygon	P. henkeli		A sclerorhynchiform.	Modern Gymnura. Onchopristis tooth. Modern Rhinoptera. Scapanorhynchus Squalicorax Modern Squatina.
Renpetia	R. labiicarinata		A sclerorhynchiform.	Modern Gymnura. Onchopristis tooth. Modern Rhinoptera. Scapanorhynchus Squalicorax Modern Squatina.
Rhinoptera			A batoid ray.	Modern Gymnura. Onchopristis tooth. Modern Rhinoptera. Scapanorhynchus Squalicorax Modern Squatina.
Scapanorhynchus	S. subulatus		A mitsukurinid similar to the modern goblin shark.	Modern Gymnura. Onchopristis tooth. Modern Rhinoptera. Scapanorhynchus Squalicorax Modern Squatina.
Schizorhiza	S. stromeri		Specimens are actually from the younger Ain Giffara Formation.	Modern Gymnura. Onchopristis tooth. Modern Rhinoptera. Scapanorhynchus Squalicorax Modern Squatina.
Squalicorax	S. baharijensis	Abundant.	A large shark.	Modern Gymnura. Onchopristis tooth. Modern Rhinoptera. Scapanorhynchus Squalicorax Modern Squatina.
Squatina			An angelshark.	Modern Gymnura. Onchopristis tooth. Modern Rhinoptera. Scapanorhynchus Squalicorax Modern Squatina.
Tribodus	T. aschersoni		A hybodont.	Modern Gymnura. Onchopristis tooth. Modern Rhinoptera. Scapanorhynchus Squalicorax Modern Squatina.

=== Bony fish ===
Osteichthyes of the Bahariya Formation
Genus	Species	Abundance	Notes	Images
Bawitius	B. bartheli	A skull fragment, teeth, and several scales.	A giant bichir.	Bawitius bartheli Ceratodus Enchodus Lepidotes Mawsonia Neoceratodus Saurodon
Ceratodus			A lungfish.	Bawitius bartheli Ceratodus Enchodus Lepidotes Mawsonia Neoceratodus Saurodon
Coelodus			A pycnodontid.	Bawitius bartheli Ceratodus Enchodus Lepidotes Mawsonia Neoceratodus Saurodon
Enchodus		One tooth.	A predatory fish.	Bawitius bartheli Ceratodus Enchodus Lepidotes Mawsonia Neoceratodus Saurodon
Lepidotes		Isolated scales.	Possibly misidentified from Bawitius bartheli.	Bawitius bartheli Ceratodus Enchodus Lepidotes Mawsonia Neoceratodus Saurodon
Mawsonia	M. lybica	Considered a "signature taxon" of the formation.	A giant freshwater coelacanth. Species assignation deemed provisional due to the lack of neotype.	Bawitius bartheli Ceratodus Enchodus Lepidotes Mawsonia Neoceratodus Saurodon
Neoceratodus	N. africanus		A lungfish related to the living Australian species.	Bawitius bartheli Ceratodus Enchodus Lepidotes Mawsonia Neoceratodus Saurodon
Obaichthys	O. africanus		An obaichthyid lepisosteiform. Remains formerly attributed to "Stromerichthys".	Bawitius bartheli Ceratodus Enchodus Lepidotes Mawsonia Neoceratodus Saurodon
Palaeonotopterus	P. greenwoodi		Nomen conservandum of the two Plethodus species previously described.	Bawitius bartheli Ceratodus Enchodus Lepidotes Mawsonia Neoceratodus Saurodon
Paranogmius	P. doederleini	Two incomplete skulls and several vertebrae.	All definitive specimens were destroyed in World War II, however Concavotectum from the Kem Kem Beds of Morocco may be a synonym.	Bawitius bartheli Ceratodus Enchodus Lepidotes Mawsonia Neoceratodus Saurodon
Plethodus	P. libycus P. tibniensis		Holotypes destroyed in World War II, but now believed to have been misidentified Palaeonotopterus greenwoodi.	Bawitius bartheli Ceratodus Enchodus Lepidotes Mawsonia Neoceratodus Saurodon
Retodus	R. tuberculatus		A lungfish species identified from remains previously assigned to Neoceratodus.	Bawitius bartheli Ceratodus Enchodus Lepidotes Mawsonia Neoceratodus Saurodon
Saurodon			Identified by Stromer in 1936, but now rejected due to this genus appearing only in post-Cenomanian Europe and North America. Now listed as Ichthyodectidae incertae sedis.	Bawitius bartheli Ceratodus Enchodus Lepidotes Mawsonia Neoceratodus Saurodon
Stromerichthys	S. aethiopicus	Skull, jaw, and opercular bones.	A fish initially identified as a bowfin relative, but now thought to be a chimera consisting of remains assignable to Bawitius, Obaichthys, and others.	Bawitius bartheli Ceratodus Enchodus Lepidotes Mawsonia Neoceratodus Saurodon

=== Testudines ===
Testudines of the Bahariya Formation
Genus	Species	Abundance	Notes	Images
Apertotemporalis	A. baharijensis	An incomplete skull	A small bothremydid pleurodiran turtle. Now classified as a nomen dubium indeterminate beyond Bothremydidae.	Holotype skull
cf. Araripemydidae	Indeterminate			Holotype skull
cf. Bothremydidae	Indeterminate			Holotype skull
cf. Chelonioidea	Indeterminate			Holotype skull

=== Squamates ===
Squamates of the Bahariya Formation
Genus	Species	Abundance	Notes	Images
Simoliophis		Abundant	First known sea snake, with functional hind legs. Now believed to include elements from different species and at least one of a different, unnamed genus.	

=== Plesiosaurs ===
Plesiosaurs of the Bahariya Formation
Genus	Species	Abundance	Notes	Images
Leptocleidus	L. capensis	Fragmentary skull bones, teeth, and vertebrae.	Formerly assigned to Leptocleidus capensis, a species known from the UK and South Africa. Now considered an indeterminate polycotylid.	Fossils assigned to L. capensis by Stromer

=== Crocodyliformes ===
Crocodyliformes of the Bahariya Formation
Genus	Species	Abundance	Notes	Images
Aegyptosuchus	A. peyeri	An incomplete skull.	A poorly known, possibly stomatosuchid crocodile.	Aegyptosuchus peyeri Libycosuchus brevirostris Hamadasuchus Stomatosuchus
Hamadasuchus	H. rebouli		A terrestrial, dog-like peirosaurid. It is possible that some material previously attributed to Libycosuchus actually belongs to this species.	Aegyptosuchus peyeri Libycosuchus brevirostris Hamadasuchus Stomatosuchus
Libycosuchus	L. brevirostris		A terrestrial crocodile of uncertain affinities, possibly related to Notosuchus.	Aegyptosuchus peyeri Libycosuchus brevirostris Hamadasuchus Stomatosuchus
Stomatosuchus	S. inermis	A partial skull and two vertebrae.	A large, flat-headed stomatosuchid with multiple small conical teeth, and possibly a pelican-like throat pouch. The only remains were destroyed in World War II.	Aegyptosuchus peyeri Libycosuchus brevirostris Hamadasuchus Stomatosuchus
Stromerosuchus	S. aegyptiacus	Fragmentary remains	Nomen dubium assigned to material found in 1911, that were badly damaged in 1922 while being shipped to Germany for study. Some material may belong to Aegyptosuchus and other to Stomatosuchus.	Aegyptosuchus peyeri Libycosuchus brevirostris Hamadasuchus Stomatosuchus

=== Pterosaurs ===
Pterosaurs of the Bahariya Formation
Genus	Species	Material	Notes	Images
Ornithocheiriformes indet.	Indeterminate	Left first wing phalanx	A medium-sized pterosaur. The first record of a pterosaur from Egypt.	

=== Dinosaurs ===
==== Sauropods ====
Sauropods of the Bahariya Formation
Genus	Species	Material	Notes	Images
Aegyptosaurus	A. baharijensis	Three caudal vertebrae, a scapula, and several limb bones.	A small/medium sized titanosaurid. Due to the remains being destroyed and fragmentary, little is known about the taxon.	Aegyptosaurus Paralititan
Dicraeosaurus	D. sp.	An isolated caudal vertebra.	Identified as Dicraeosaurus by Stromer in 1932. Subsequently considered a rebbachisaurid, or a third, unnamed titanosaur.	Aegyptosaurus Paralititan
Paralititan	P. stromeri	Four vertebrae, a scapula, and incomplete forelimb. An incomplete dorsal vertebra destroyed during WWII may also belong to P. stromeri.	A large titanosaurid.	Aegyptosaurus Paralititan
Rebbachisauridae? indet.	Unnamed	An isolated scapula.		Aegyptosaurus Paralititan

==== Theropods ====
Theropods of the Bahariya Formation
Genus	Species	Abundance	Notes	Images
Abelisauridae indet.	Unnamed	MUVP 477, an isolated caudal (tenth) cervical vertebra.	A medium-sized abelisaurid, estimated around 5.77 metres (18.9 ft) long.	Deltadromeus Spinosaurus Tameryraptor
Abelisauridae? indet.	Undescribed	Several shed teeth crowns.	A small-sized theropod, possibly an abelisaurid. Additionally, its teeth superficially resemble those of dromaeosaurids but likely come from a different kind of theropod.	Deltadromeus Spinosaurus Tameryraptor
Bahariasaurus	B. ingens	A holotype specimen consisting of an incomplete postcranial skeleton. Several other specimens have been assigned including femora, vertebrae, and scapulae.	A large-sized theropod known from several fragmentary skeletons, all of which are now lost. The affinities of this genus are unknown, though it may be a megaraptoran, ornithomimosaur, ceratosaur, or other form of theropod. Deltadromeus may be a synonym of Bahariasaurus, though this is unclear.	Deltadromeus Spinosaurus Tameryraptor
Carcharodontosaurus	C. saharicus	A partial skull, teeth, and fragmentary postcranial remains.	Reassigned to own genus and species, Tameryraptor.	Deltadromeus Spinosaurus Tameryraptor
Ceratosauria?				Deltadromeus Spinosaurus Tameryraptor
Deltadromeus	D. agilis	Several limb, pelvic, and pectoral girdle bones.	Several remains originally referred to Bahariasaurus were referred to Deltadromeus. It is uncertain whether it and Bahariasaurus are synonymous or distinct.	Deltadromeus Spinosaurus Tameryraptor
cf. Elaphrosaurus	cf. E. bambergi	Two tibiae and a femur.	Identified as cf. E. bambergi by Stromer in 1934. Now regarded as coming from a tetanuran, possibly a coelurosaur, or "probable ceratosaur".	Deltadromeus Spinosaurus Tameryraptor
aff. Erectopus	aff. E. sauvagei	An incomplete right tibia.	May have affinities with Ceratosauria or belong to Bahariasaurus or Deltadromeus.	Deltadromeus Spinosaurus Tameryraptor
Spinosaurus	"Spinosaurus B"	One individual known from a fragmentary postcranial skeleton.	Considered a distinct species of Spinosaurus by Ernst Stromer. It may instead belong to S. aegyptiacus, Sigilmassasaurus brevicollis, or its own species.	Deltadromeus Spinosaurus Tameryraptor
Spinosaurus	S. aegyptiacus	One associated skeleton consisting of skull and postcranial bones. Fragmentary vertebrae, teeth, and other elements have also been found.	A large spinosaurid.	Deltadromeus Spinosaurus Tameryraptor
Tameryraptor	T. markgrafi	A partial skull, teeth, and fragmentary postcranial remains.	A large carcharodontosaurid theropod, originally assigned to Carcharodontosaurus.	Deltadromeus Spinosaurus Tameryraptor

== Flora ==
Thirty different genera are known from Bahariya, including megaflora. Much of the material is yet to be described. Other taxa include Sapindales, Piperaceae, Lauraceae, Platanaceae, Magnoliopsida, Nymphaeaceae, Cornaceae, Proteaceae and Vitaceae not identified at genus level; and miospore and pollen species.

Vascular Plants
Genus	Species	Abundance	Notes	Images
Agathis	A/W spp.	Few Specimens	An Araucarian conifer, now restricted to Australasia.	Cladophlebis Sapindopsis Weichselia
Agathoxylon	A. (Dadoxylon) aegyptiacum	Wood	Araucarian woods	Cladophlebis Sapindopsis Weichselia
Araliaephyllum?	Indeterminate ("Morphotype-14")	Few Specimens	Suggested to be related with Lauraceae	Cladophlebis Sapindopsis Weichselia
Cladophlebis	C. spp.	Few Specimens	Fern Laflets	Cladophlebis Sapindopsis Weichselia
Cornophyllum	C. distense	Few Specimens	Suggested to be related with Cornaceae	Cladophlebis Sapindopsis Weichselia
Cinnamophyllum?	Indeterminate ("Morphotype-12")	Few Specimens	Suggested to be related with Lauraceae	Cladophlebis Sapindopsis Weichselia
Eucalyptolaurus/"Myrtophyllum"(?)	Indeterminate ("Morphotype-08")	Few Specimens	Specimens of the family Lauraceae	Cladophlebis Sapindopsis Weichselia
Evodioxylon	E. intermedium	Wood	Putative Rutaceae	Cladophlebis Sapindopsis Weichselia
Laurophyllum	L. africanum	Few Specimens	Specimens of the family Lauraceae	Cladophlebis Sapindopsis Weichselia
Liriophyllum	L. farafraense	Few Specimens	Specimens of the family Magnoliaceae	Cladophlebis Sapindopsis Weichselia
Marsilea	aff. Marsilea spp.	Few Specimens	Water fern.	Cladophlebis Sapindopsis Weichselia
Magnoliid	"Morphotype-01"; "Morphotype-04"; "Morphotype-09"; "Morphotype-11"; "Morphotype 21"?; "Morphotype 24"?	Few Specimens	Shows festooned brochidodromous venation	Cladophlebis Sapindopsis Weichselia
Magnoliaephyllum	M. auriculatum; M. bahariyense; M. isbergiana	Few Specimens	Possible affinities with Lauraceae	Cladophlebis Sapindopsis Weichselia
Monocotyledon	"Morphotype 26"	Few Specimens	Flowering Plant	Cladophlebis Sapindopsis Weichselia
Nelumbites	N. schweinfurthi; N. giganteum	Common occurrence in the lower shale bed	Typical leaves of the faimily Nelumbonaceae	Cladophlebis Sapindopsis Weichselia
Nymphaeales	Indeterminate ("Morphotype-22")	Few Specimens	Aquatic Flowering Plant	Cladophlebis Sapindopsis Weichselia
Paradoxopteris	P. stromeri	Co-Dominant plant	Xerophytic tree fern suggestive of a dry tropical climate.	Cladophlebis Sapindopsis Weichselia
Plumafolium?	Indeterminate ("Morphotype-18")	Few Specimens	A Monocot, probably related with Liliopsida	Cladophlebis Sapindopsis Weichselia
Podozamites?	Indeterminate ("Morphotype-27")	Few Specimens	Coniferophyte	Cladophlebis Sapindopsis Weichselia
Pteridophyte	Indeterminate ("Morphotype-28")	Few Specimens	Fern clearly distinct from Weichselia	Cladophlebis Sapindopsis Weichselia
Rodgersia	R. longifolia	Few Specimens	Likely lobes of a much bigger leaf of Sapindopsis type	Cladophlebis Sapindopsis Weichselia
Trochodendroides?	Indeterminate ("Morphotype-23")	Few Specimens	Probably related to Cercidiphyllaceae	Cladophlebis Sapindopsis Weichselia
Typhaephyllum	cf. T. sp.	Few Specimens	Interpreted as a monocot, probably related to Typhaceae	Cladophlebis Sapindopsis Weichselia
Vitiphyllum	V. aff. multifidum	Few Specimens	Some similarities with Pabiania of the family Lauraceae	Cladophlebis Sapindopsis Weichselia
Weichselia	W. reticulata	Dominant plant	Xerophytic tree fern suggestive of a dry tropical climate.	Cladophlebis Sapindopsis Weichselia

== See also ==
- List of dinosaur-bearing rock formations
