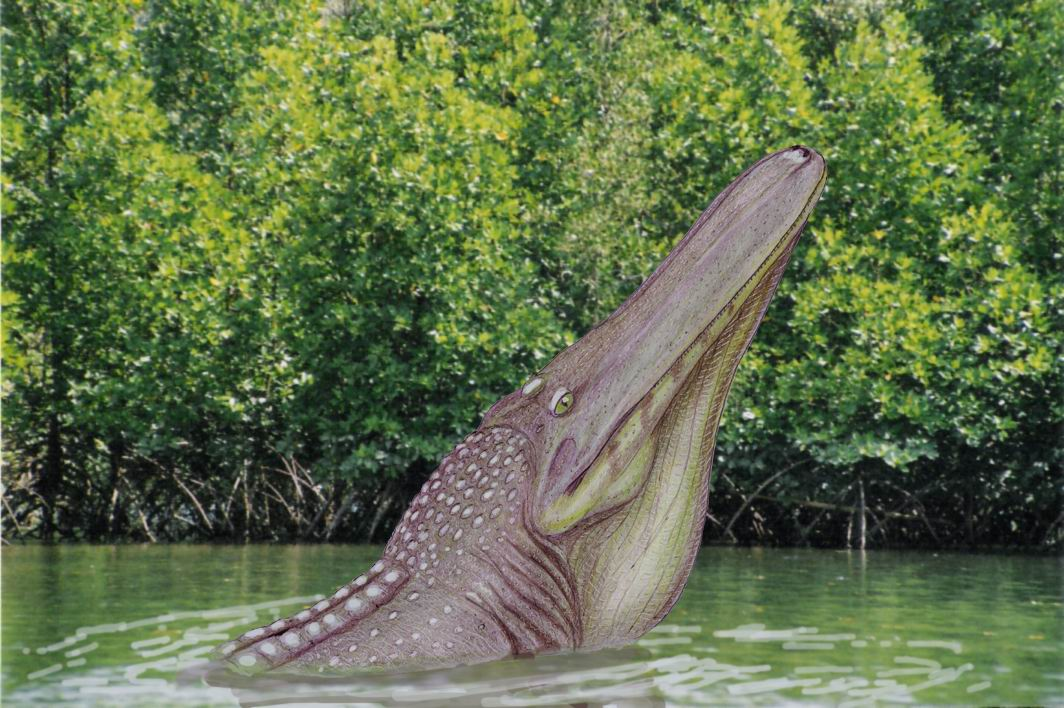
- Life restoration of a Stomatosuchus in its environment

Scientific classification
- Kingdom: Animalia
- Phylum: Chordata
- Class: Reptilia
- Clade: Pseudosuchia
- Clade: Crocodylomorpha
- Family: †Stomatosuchidae
- Genus: †Stomatosuchus; Stromer, 1925

Type species
- †Stomatosuchus inermis Stromer, 1925

= Stomatosuchus =

Stomatosuchus Temporal range: Late Cretaceous, 100–94 Ma Cenomanian

Extinct genus of reptiles

Stomatosuchus (meaning "mouth crocodile") is an extinct stomatosuchid neosuchian from the Late Cretaceous (Cenomanian) Bahariya Formation of Egypt. The type and only species is S. inermis. Much of what is known about Stomatosuchus has been inferred from the related genus Laganosuchus.

== Discovery and naming ==
The only known specimen of S. inermis consisted of a partial skull and two caudal vertebrae. It was collected in Egypt during 1911 by the German paleontologist Ernst Stromer whilst on an expedition. It was delivered to the Munich Museum in 1922, and the museum was later destroyed by an Allied bombing raid on 24/25 April 1944. Currently, only photographs of the specimen remain.

== Description ==
It grew to a length of 10 metres (33 ft), and possessed a long, flattened skull with lid-like jaws that were lined with small, conical teeth, and the skull reached up to 2 metres (6.6 ft) long. The mandible may have been toothless and perhaps even supported a pelican-like throat pouch. However, this pouch could have been used to scoop up fish and sharks much like a modern day pelican, while the conical teeth would prevent the prey from escaping. Due to such a bizarre skull structure, much about the diet of S. inermis remains unknown.

== Habitat ==
It is likely that S. inermis lived in the marshy lowlands of what is now the Eastern Sahara Desert. It may have populated the entirety of Northern Africa but due to the only fossil evidence of the species being destroyed and no other bones having been found since, it is impossible to establish an exact range.

== Gallery ==
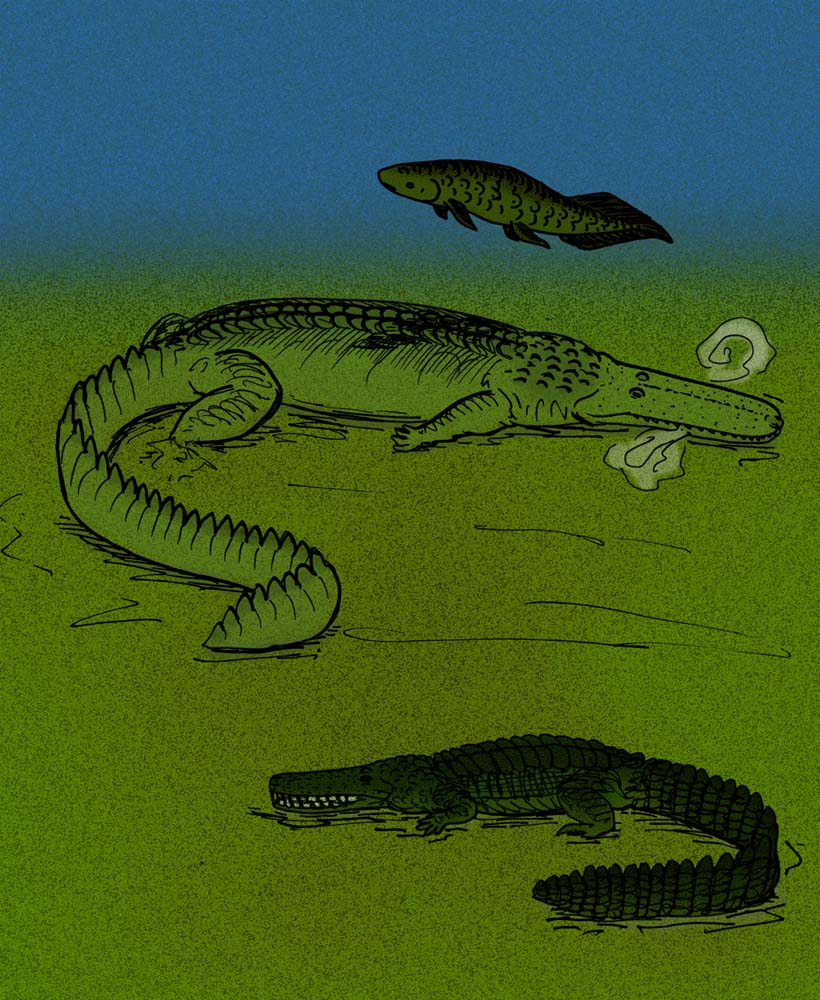
Comparison of Stomatosuchus (center) with Retodus (top) Laganosuchus (bottom)

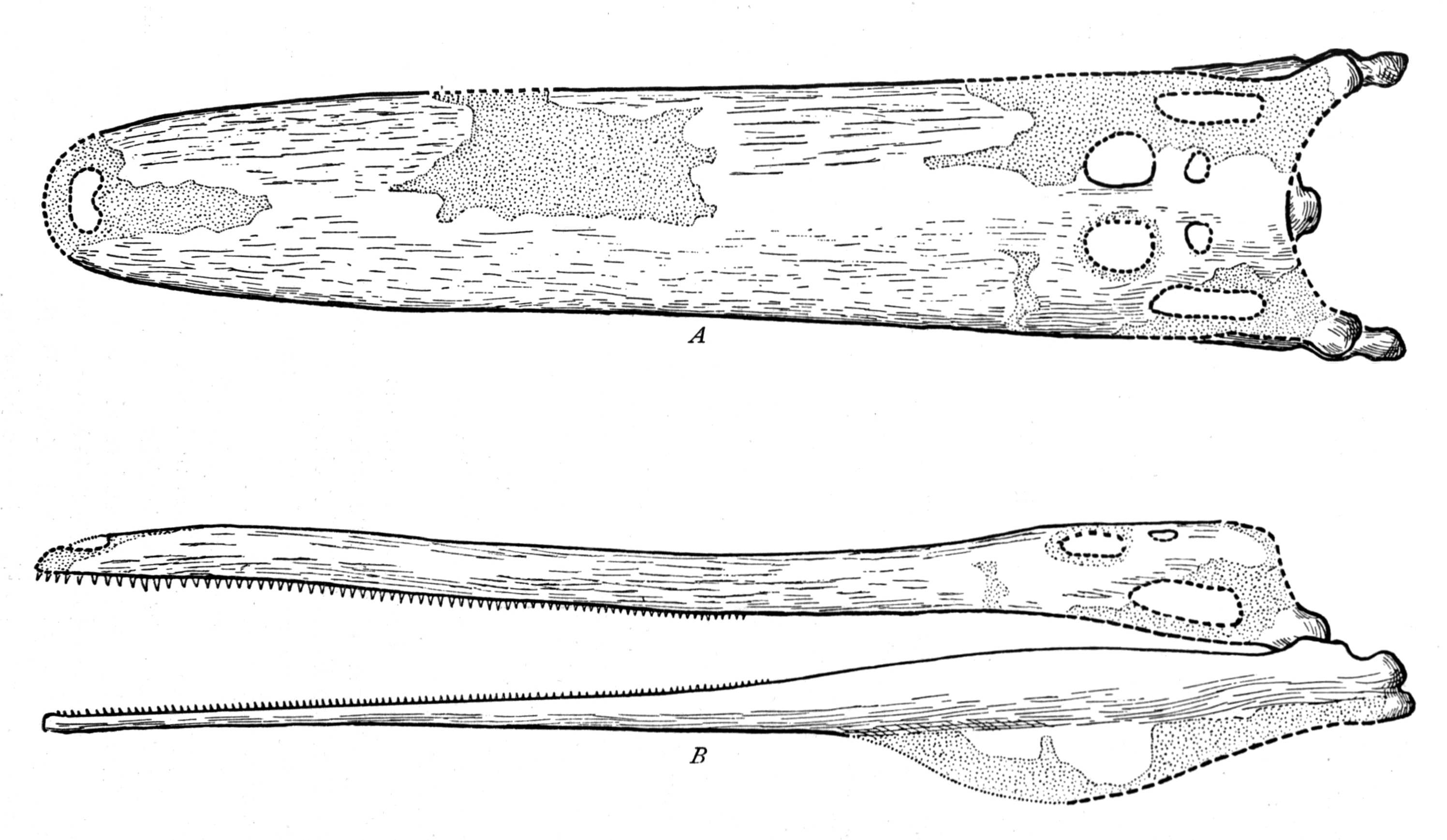
Skull seen from two angles

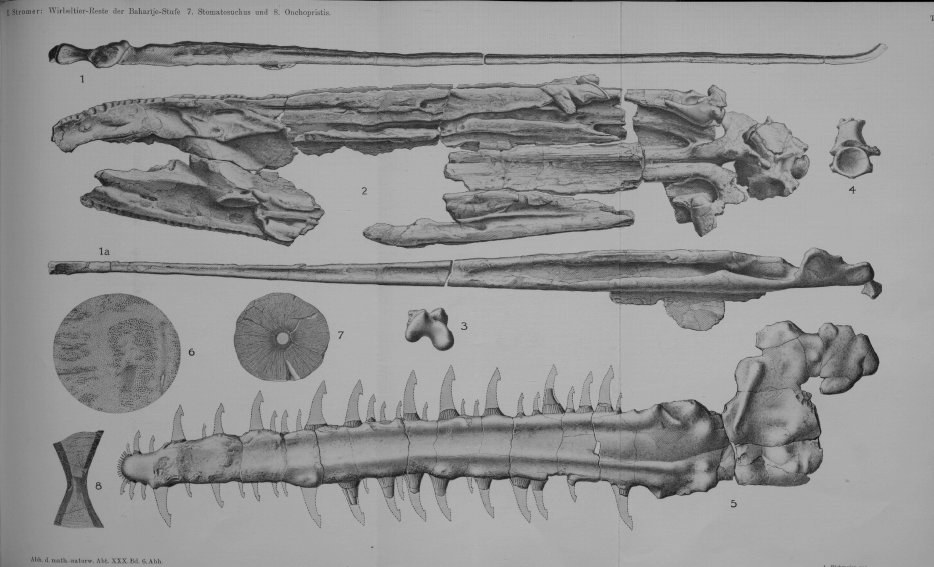
Holotype skull

== See also ==
- Mourasuchus, a similarly pouch-throated caiman from Miocene South America.
