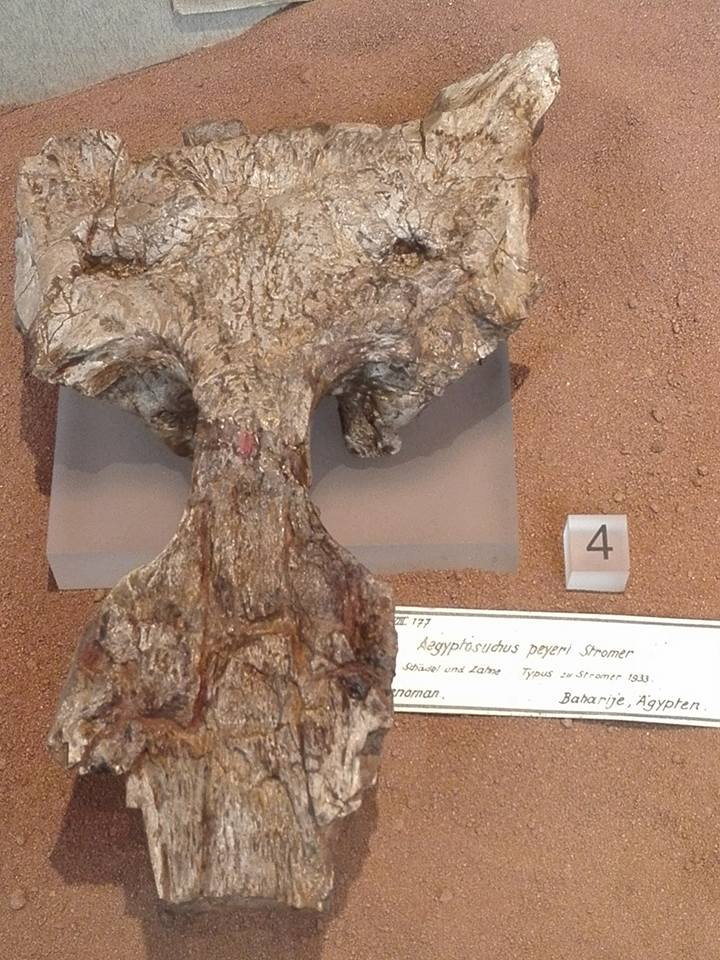
- Skull

Scientific classification
- Kingdom: Animalia
- Phylum: Chordata
- Class: Reptilia
- Clade: Archosauria
- Clade: Pseudosuchia
- Clade: Crocodylomorpha
- Clade: Neosuchia
- Clade: Eusuchia
- Family: †Aegyptosuchidae
- Genus: †Aegyptosuchus; Stromer, 1933

Type species
- †Aegyptosuchus peyeri Stromer, 1933

= Aegyptosuchus =

Aegyptosuchus Temporal range: Late Cretaceous: Cenomanian, 100.5–93.9 Ma

Extinct genus of reptiles

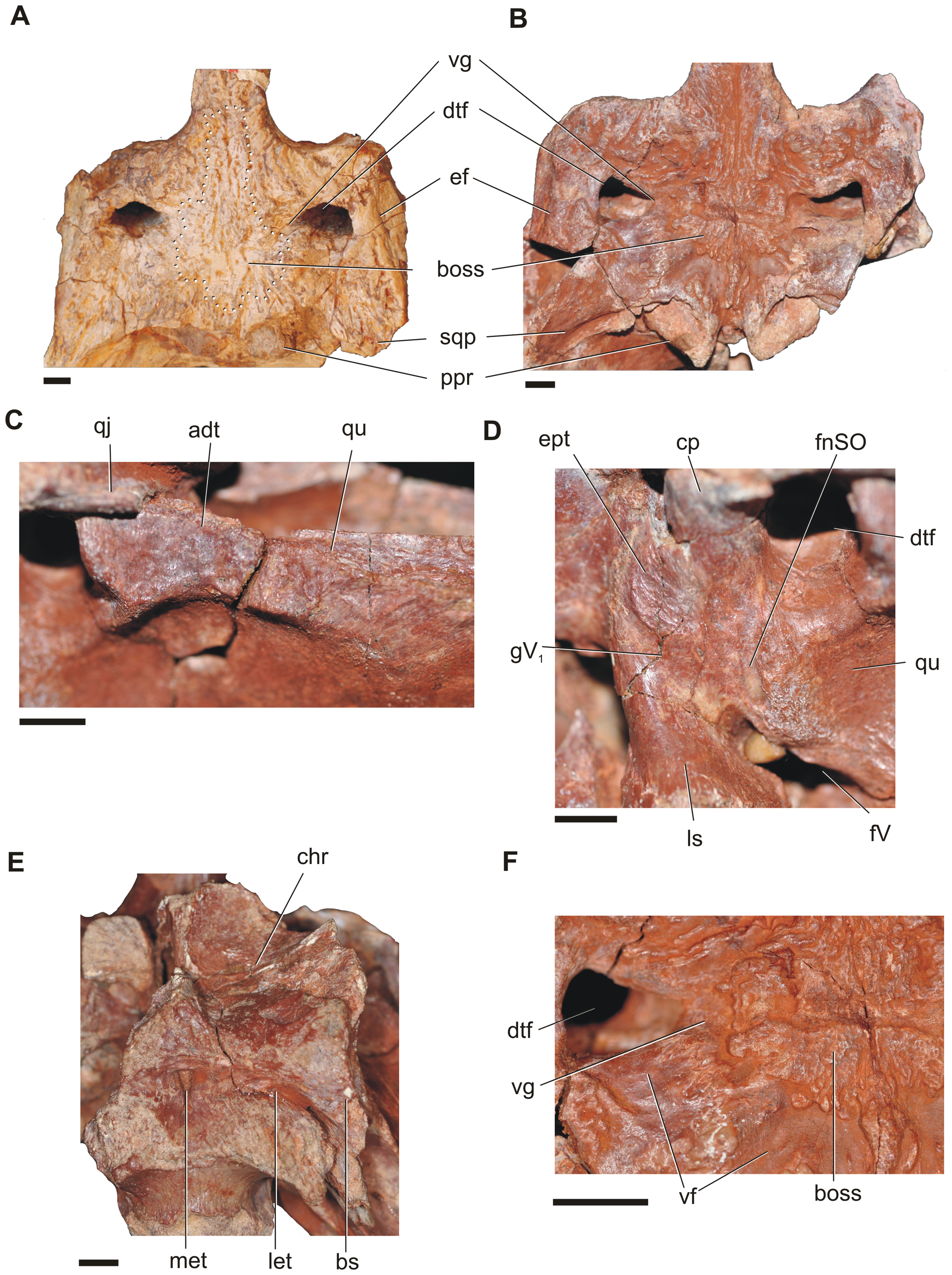
Aegyptosuchus (A) compared with Aegisuchus

Aegyptosuchus ("Egyptian crocodile") is an extinct monospecific genus of aegyptosuchid eusuchian crocodyliform. It was found in the Bahariya Formation of Egypt, which dates back to the Cenomanian age of the Late Cretaceous. The type and only species is Aegyptosuchus peyeri.

Aegyptosuchus is a member of the family Aegyptosuchidae, along with the genus Aegisuchus. Aegyptosuchidae belongs to the clade Eusuchia, and is proposed to be the sister clade to the crown group Crocodylia, which contains all extant (living) crocodilians. The phylogeny can be shown in the cladogram below:

- Neosuchia
  - Theriosuchus
  - - Goniopholis
    - - Bernissartia
      - Eusuchia
        - Isisfordia
        - - Hylaeochampsa
          - - Crocodylia
              - Gavialoidea
              - Borealosuchus
              - - - Leidyosuchus
                  - Crocodyloidea
                - Alligatoroidea
            - Aegyptosuchidae
              - Aegyptosuchus
              - Aegisuchus
