= Ernst Stromer =

German paleontologist

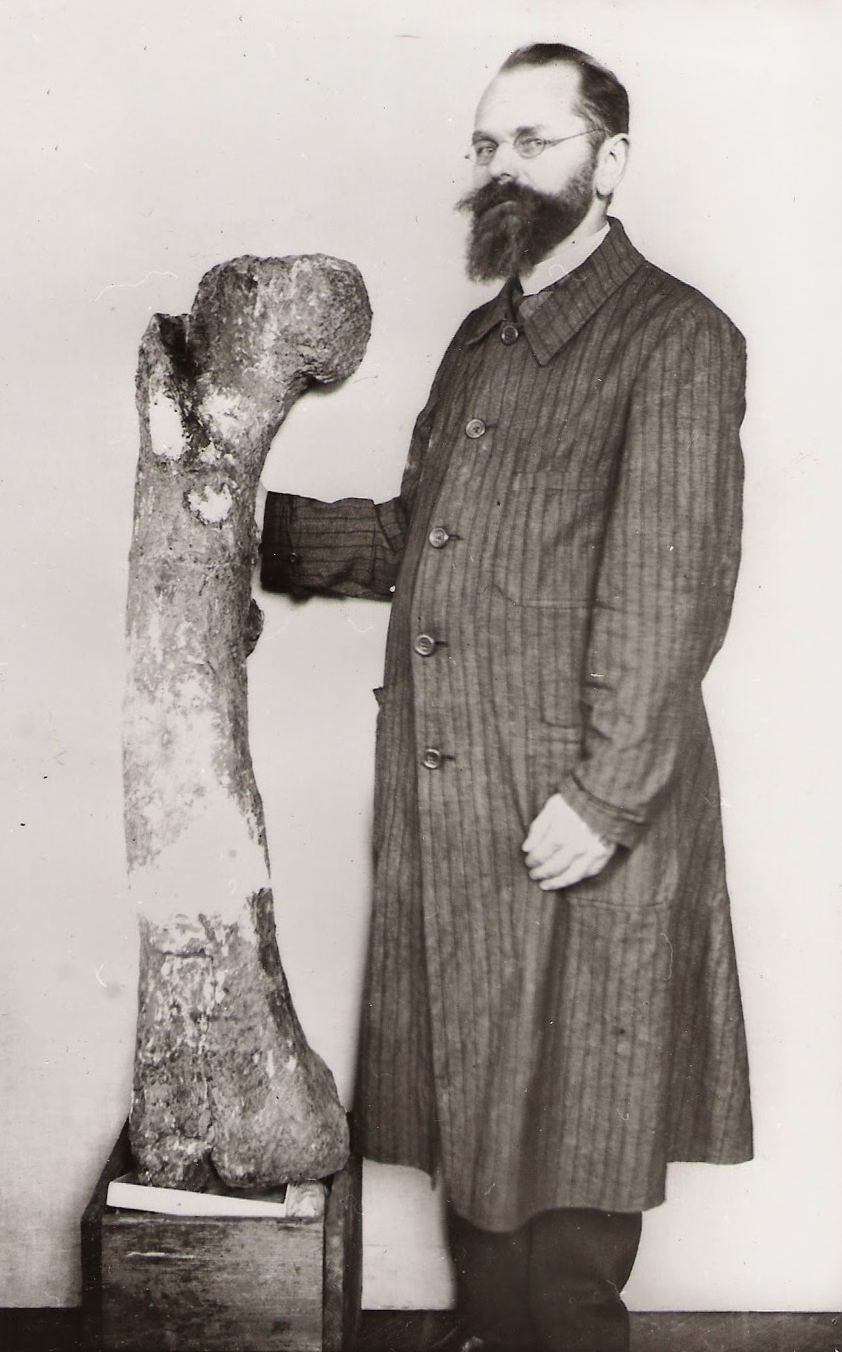
- Stromer in 1914 next to the femur of a Bahariasaurus
- Born: Ernst Freiherr Stromer von Reichenbach; 12 June 1871; Nuremberg, German Empire
- Died: 18 December 1952 (aged 81); Erlangen, West Germany
- Known for: Discovery of Spinosaurus
- Children: 3
- Scientific career
- Fields: Paleontology

Ernst Freiherr Stromer von Reichenbach (June 12, 1871 – December 18, 1952) was a German paleontologist best remembered for his expedition to Egypt, during which the discovery of the first known remains of Spinosaurus was made.

From an aristocratic background, Stromer studied palaeontology in Munich. He would then make three expeditions to Egypt to unearth fossils, the most significant being his 1910–1911 expedition. Working with fellow palaeontologist Richard Markgraf, Stromer first described the dinosaur Spinosaurus. He additionally first described the dinosaurus Aegyptosaurus, Bahariasaurus, and Carcharodontosaurus, and the giant crocodilian Stomatosuchus. Due to his criticisms of Nazism, Stromer's career declined in the 1930s and 1940s. Many of the fossils discovered by Stromer were destroyed during World War II, leaving today's scientists only a few photographs of the previously existing specimens to rely on.

In 1929, the fossil bird genus Stromeria (now included in the genus Eremopezus) was named in Stromer's honour by Kálmán Lambrecht. Smith et al. (2001) also named the sauropod Paralititan stromeri in his honour.

== Biography ==
=== Early life and family ===
Ernst Stromer was born on 12 June 1871 in Nuremberg, Bavaria in Germany. He came from an aristocratic family who had produced several architects, lawyers, judges, scientists and politicians for Nuremberg since the 1400s. The "Freiherr" in his name roughly equals "baron" in English. Stromer's father, Otto Stromer von Reichenbach, had served as the Mayor of Nuremberg from 1867 to 1891. He had an older brother, Friedrich (1867–1940), who became a historian.

Stromer originally studied medicine before switching to geology and palaeontology at the Ludwig-Maximilians-Universität München. His mentor and thesis adviser was palaeontologist Karl Alfred von Zittel.

Stromer was married to Elisabeth Rennebaum (1886–1977) in 1920 and had three sons: Ulman, Wolfgang (1922–1999), and Gerhart.

=== 1910-11 Egypt expedition ===
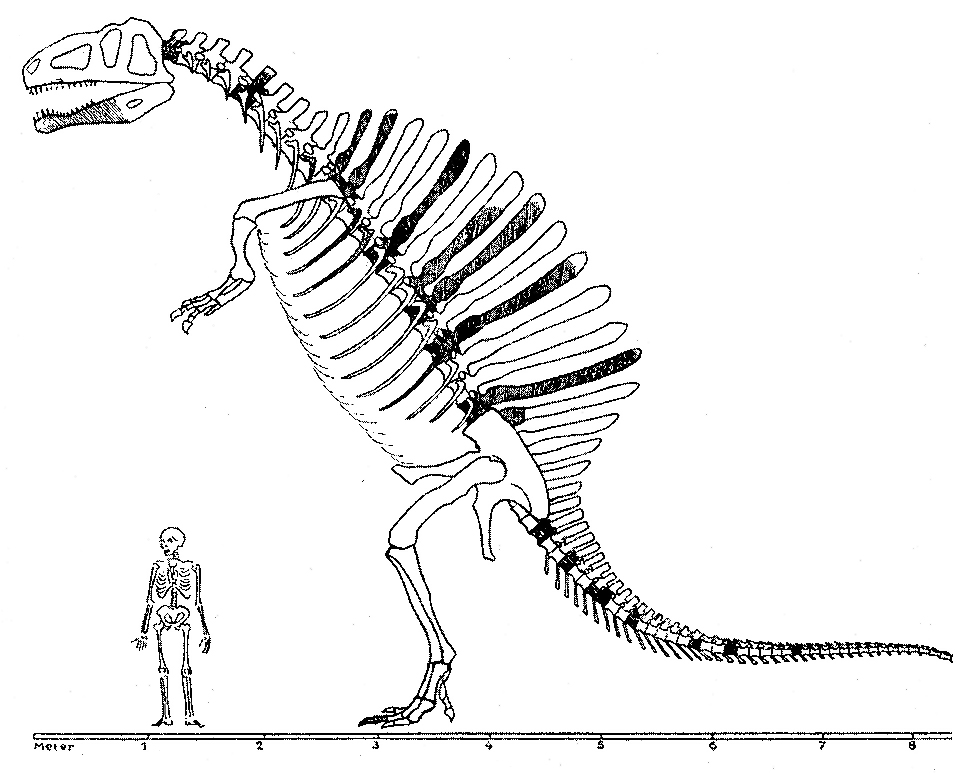
Stromer's illustration of Spinosaurus in 1915.

On 7 November 1910, Stromer arrived in Alexandria, Egypt, aboard the Norddeutscher Lloyd steamship Cleopatra. After a two-day setback imposed by a temporary quarantine, the expedition set out by train to arrive in Cairo the next day. This was his third expedition to Egypt.

On 14 November, Stromer went to meet with John Ball, the founder of the Desert Survey Department of the Geological Survey of Egypt. In that year, the survey had published the first topographic map of Egypt and was finishing a geological map that was to be published in 1911. Both sources were invaluable to Stromer, now planning his upcoming expedition to Bahariya, an area of the Western Desert that was little known.

Stromer and Markgraf began the expedition with the goal of discovering fossil mammals to support Stromer's theory of an African origin of humanity. Stromer's 1910 journals from Wadi el Natrun reveal that he worked all through the day, hiking for miles, climbing hills, and hammering pieces of rock from outcroppings throughout the valley. He discovered sharks' teeth, broken shells of ancient turtles, and the occasional jaw of a prehistoric crocodile. Despite these discoveries, his failure to uncover ancient mammals left him disappointed, and he returned to Cairo.

After more than a week of walking, they arrived in the Bahariya Oasis on January 11, 1911. Due to the inaccuracy of the understanding of the geologic history of the Bahariya Oasis in 1911, Stromer erroneously believed the oasis to date to the Eocene rather than Cretaceous.

On January 18, Stromer unearthed three very large limb bones, the first dinosaur fossils discovered in Egypt, at the Bahariya Formation southwest of Cairo. He soon had to return to Germany, but his fossil collector Richard Markgraf discovered the partial skeleton of a new dinosaur from Bahariya in 1912 which he shipped to Stromer. The partial skeleton consisted of a lower jaw, teeth, and vertebrae that had dorsal spines. Stromer published his findings in the Abhandlungen (Discourse) of the Bavarian Academy of Sciences in 1915, naming the dinosaur Spinosaurus aegyptiacus. Stromer theorised that Spinosaurus' spines formed a fatty hump akin to a bison.

=== World Wars and the Interwar period ===
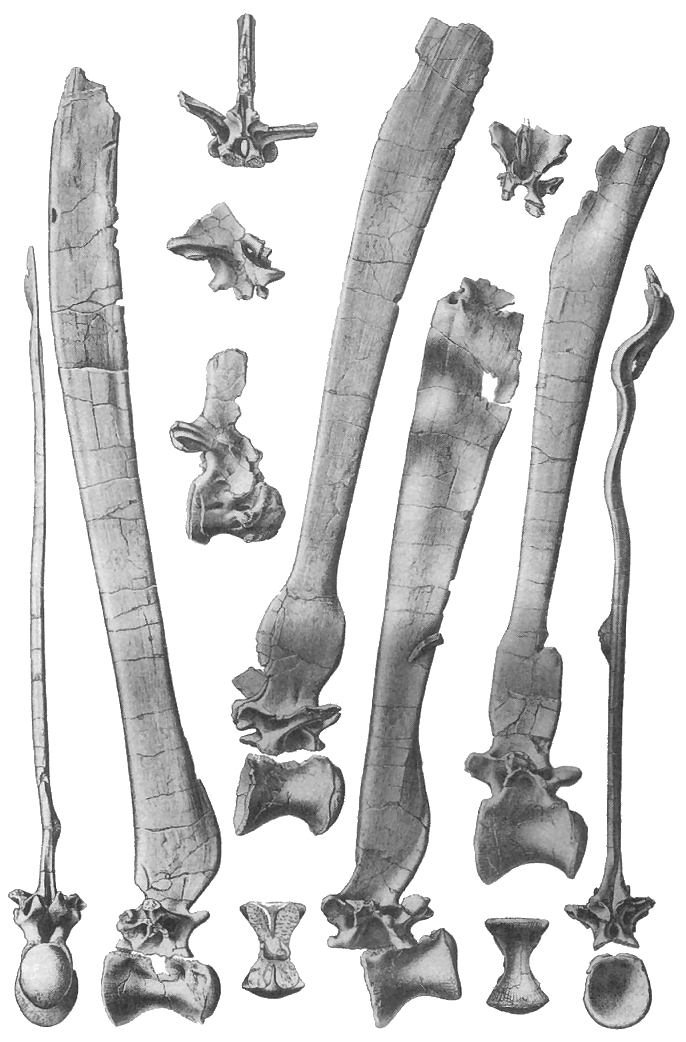
An illustration by Stromer detailing the neural spines of Spinosaurus

With the onset of World War I, travel restrictions meant Stromer couldn't return to Egypt and Markgraf couldn't ship any fossils to Germany. Markgraf died in 1916, and it was only in 1922 that Stromer received Markgraf's fossils. They were however broken due to being repackaged multiple times. After piecing the fossils back together, Stromer published a series of papers in the 1930s describing three new dinosaurs: the sauropod Aegyptosaurus, and the theropods Bahariasaurus (1934) and Carcharodontosaurus (1931).

As a critic of Nazism, Stromer's career suffered under Nazi Germany. Since he came from an aristocratic background, the Nazis avoided arresting or publicly attacking him, but still sought to make his life difficult. In 1937, Stromer was forced to retire. During World War II, his three sons were conscripted and fought on the Eastern Front. Two of them were killed in 1941 and 1944, whilst the remaining son, Wolfgang, was captured and sent to a Soviet labour camp where he remained until being repatriated in 1951.

On 25 April 1944, Munich was bombed by the British Royal Air Force. Much of Stromer's specimens from Egypt were on display at the Bavarian State Collection of Palaeontology, and were destroyed. This included the only known (though incomplete) skeletons of Spinosaurus and Aegyptosaurus. Stromer had attempted to convince the museum director to relocate the fossils, but was declined by the director, Karl Beurlen. Beurlen was a convinced national socialist, who believed that the Luftwaffe would protect German cities. When Stromer unsuccessfully insisted that the fossils be relocated, Beurlen threatened to report him and to have Stromer placed in a concentration camp.

Stromer's drawings and notes survived the war. In 1995, Wolfgang donated photographs of his father's destroyed Spinosaurus specimen to the Palaeontological Museum, Munich.

== Sources ==
- Nothdurft, William and Smith, Josh. Book. The Lost Dinosaurs of Egypt. Cosmos Studios, New York. 2002.
- A Tribute to Ernst Stromer: Hundred Years of the Discovery of Spinosaurus aegypticus: Saubhik Ghosh: EKDIN, 11 and 12 July 2011 (www.ekdin.org)
- Probst, Ernst: Der rätselhafte Spinosaurus. Leben und Werk des Forschers Ernst Stromer von Reichenbach. GRIN, Munich 2015
