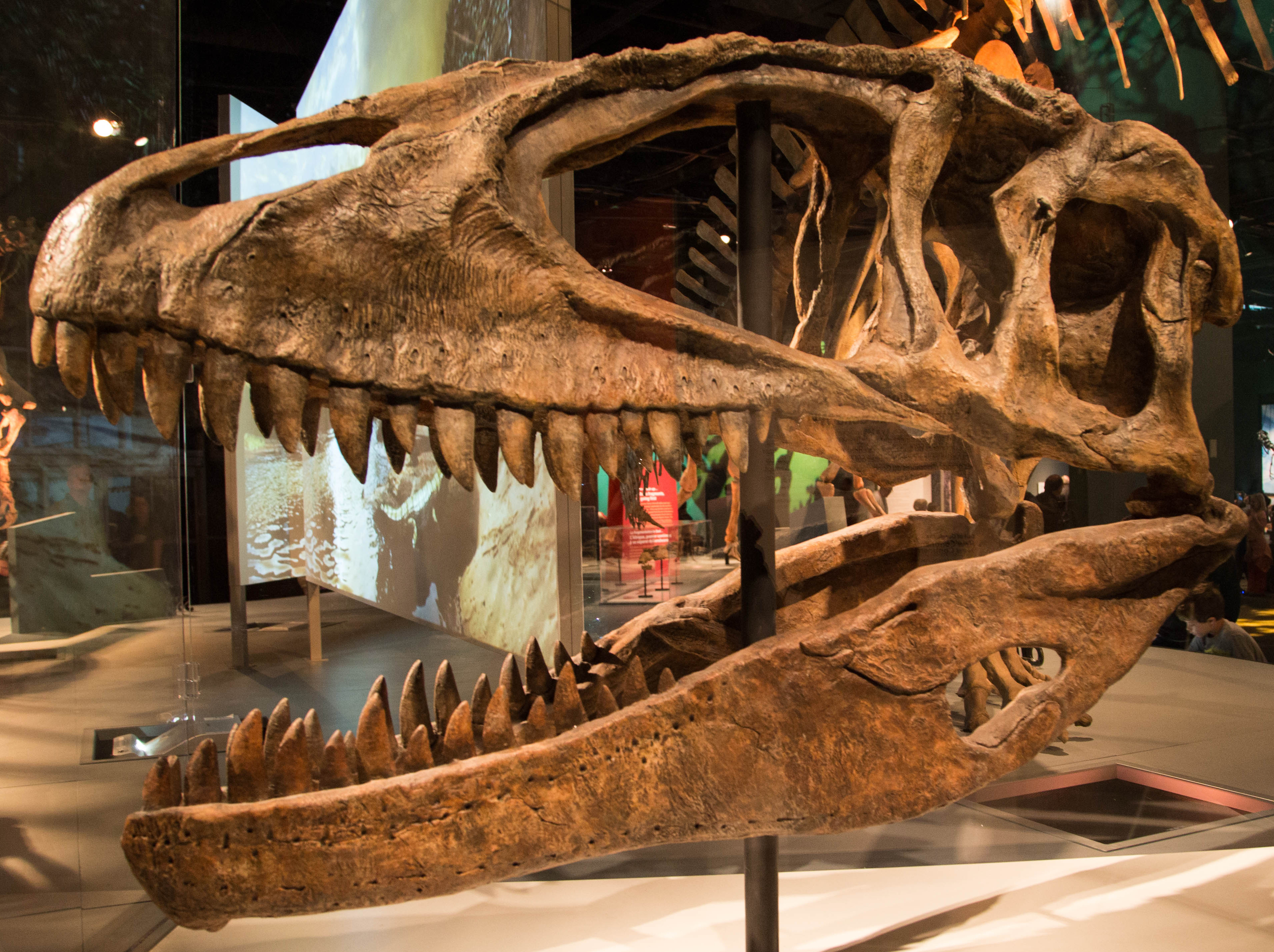
- Reconstructed C. saharicus skull, Science Museum of Minnesota

Scientific classification
- Kingdom: Animalia
- Phylum: Chordata
- Class: Reptilia
- Clade: Dinosauria
- Clade: Saurischia
- Clade: Theropoda
- Family: †Carcharodontosauridae
- Subfamily: †Carcharodontosaurinae
- Genus: †Carcharodontosaurus; Stromer, 1931

Type species
- †Megalosaurus saharicus (original combination) Depéret & Savornin, 1925

Other species
- †C. iguidensis? Brusatte & Sereno, 2007

Synonyms
- List: Megalosaurus saharicus Depéret & Savornin, 1925; Megalosaurus (Dryptosaurus) saharicus (Depéret & Savornin, 1925; Megalosaurus africanus von Huene, 1956; ?Sauroniops pachytholus Cau et al., 2013

= Carcharodontosaurus =

Carcharodontosaurus Temporal range: Late Cretaceous (Cenomanian), 100–94 Ma

Genus of carcharodontosaurid dinosaur from the Cretaceous period

Carcharodontosaurus (/ˌkɑːrkəroʊˌdɒntoʊˈsɔːrəs/; "shark-toothed lizard") is a genus of large theropod dinosaur that lived in Northwest Africa from about 100 to 94 million years ago during the Cenomanian age of the late Cretaceous period. The genus was first described in 1925 by French paleontologists Charles Depéret and Justin Savornin as Megalosaurus saharicus, based on two fossil teeth discovered in Algeria, which are now lost. A partial skeleton was discovered in Egypt as early as 1914 by crews of German paleontologist Ernst Stromer, although he did not report the find until 1931. Based on this specimen as well as the teeth previously described by Depéret and Savornin, Stromer established the genus Carcharodontosaurus, with C. saharicus as the only species. Although the Egyptian skeleton was destroyed during World War II, it was redescribed as a closely related but distinct genus, Tameryraptor, based on historical photographs in 2025. In 1995, a large incomplete skull attributed to C. saharicus was discovered in the Kem Kem Beds of Morocco, which was officially proposed as the neotype (specimen the species is based on) in 2007. In the same year, fossils unearthed from the Farak Formation of Niger were described and named as another species, C. iguidensis, though this taxon might belong to a different genus.

C. saharicus reached around 12 m (39 ft) in length and approximately 5–7 metric tons (5.5–7.7 short tons) in body mass, and was therefore one of the largest theropod dinosaurs known. It had a large, lightly built skull with a triangular snout. Its jaws were lined with sharp, recurved, and serrated teeth that bear striking resemblances to those of the great white shark (genus Carcharodon), the inspiration for the name. Though giant, its cranium was made lighter by greatly expanded fossae (depressions in bone) and fenestrae (holes in the skull), but this made the cranium more fragile than that of tyrannosaurids. Studies of the bite force and tooth anatomy of Carcharodontosaurus suggest a relatively low bite force compared to other large theropods. Although the skeleton is incompletely known, it is thought to have had small forelimbs, powerful hind limbs, and a long tail that provided balance. Several other gigantic theropods are known from North Africa during this period, including the spinosaurid Spinosaurus and the possible ceratosaur Deltadromeus. North Africa at the time was blanketed in mangrove forests and wetlands, creating a hotspot of fish, crocodyliforms, and pterosaur diversity.

== Discovery and species ==
=== Initial finds ===
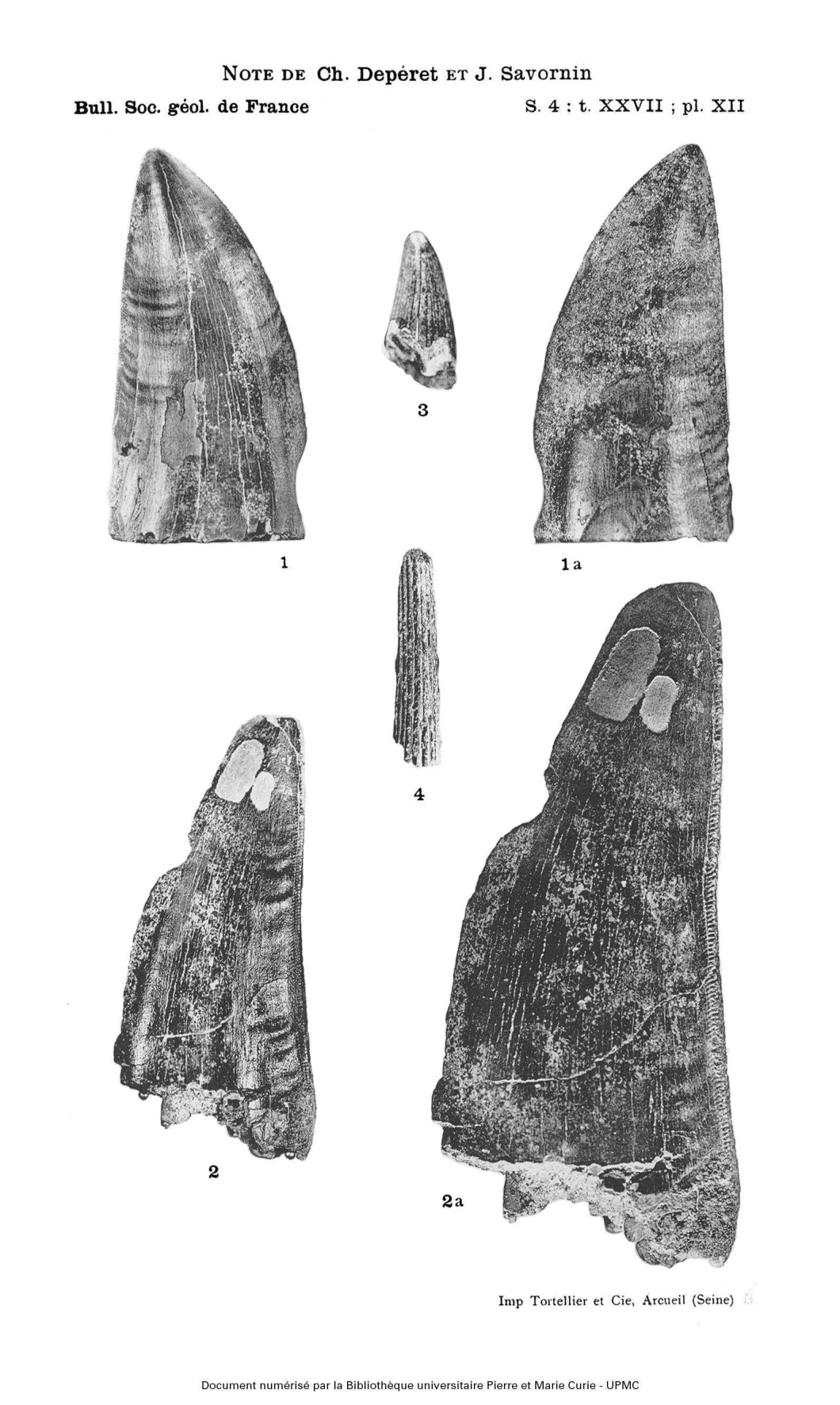
Lost original teeth of C. saharicus (Fig. 1-2), the lectotype being at the top (Fig. 1)

In 1924, two teeth of Carcharodontosaurus were unearthed from wall cuts in different foggaras near Timimoun, French Algeria. These sediments came from the Cretaceous-aged Continental intercalaire Formation. The fossils were taken to the governor of Timimoun, Captain Burté, who gave them to French paleontologist Charles Depéret later that year. In 1925, Depéret and his colleague Justin Savornin described the teeth as coming from a new species of theropod dinosaur, Megalosaurus saharicus. These were the first fossils of theropods to be described from the region. The specific name saharicus refers to the Sahara Desert where the teeth had been found. Two years later, Depéret and Savornin reassigned the same teeth under the name M. (Dryptosaurus) saharicus, thereby placing the species in a subgenus. By accident, another species of Megalosaurus, M. africanus, was named by German paleontologist Friedrich von Huene based on the same teeth. It is therefore implied that it is a junior synonym of M. saharicus. The two original teeth described by Depéret and Savornin have since been reported as lost, being possibly kept in a collection in Algeria, Paris, or Lyon, and lack distinguishing characteristics from other carcharodontosaurids. Moreover, the genus Megalosaurus is known to have historically been a wastebasket taxon that included several species assigned without justification, the only currently recognised species being M. bucklandii. Later authors mentioned additional fossils from other provinces of Algeria that could belong to Carcharodontosaurus.

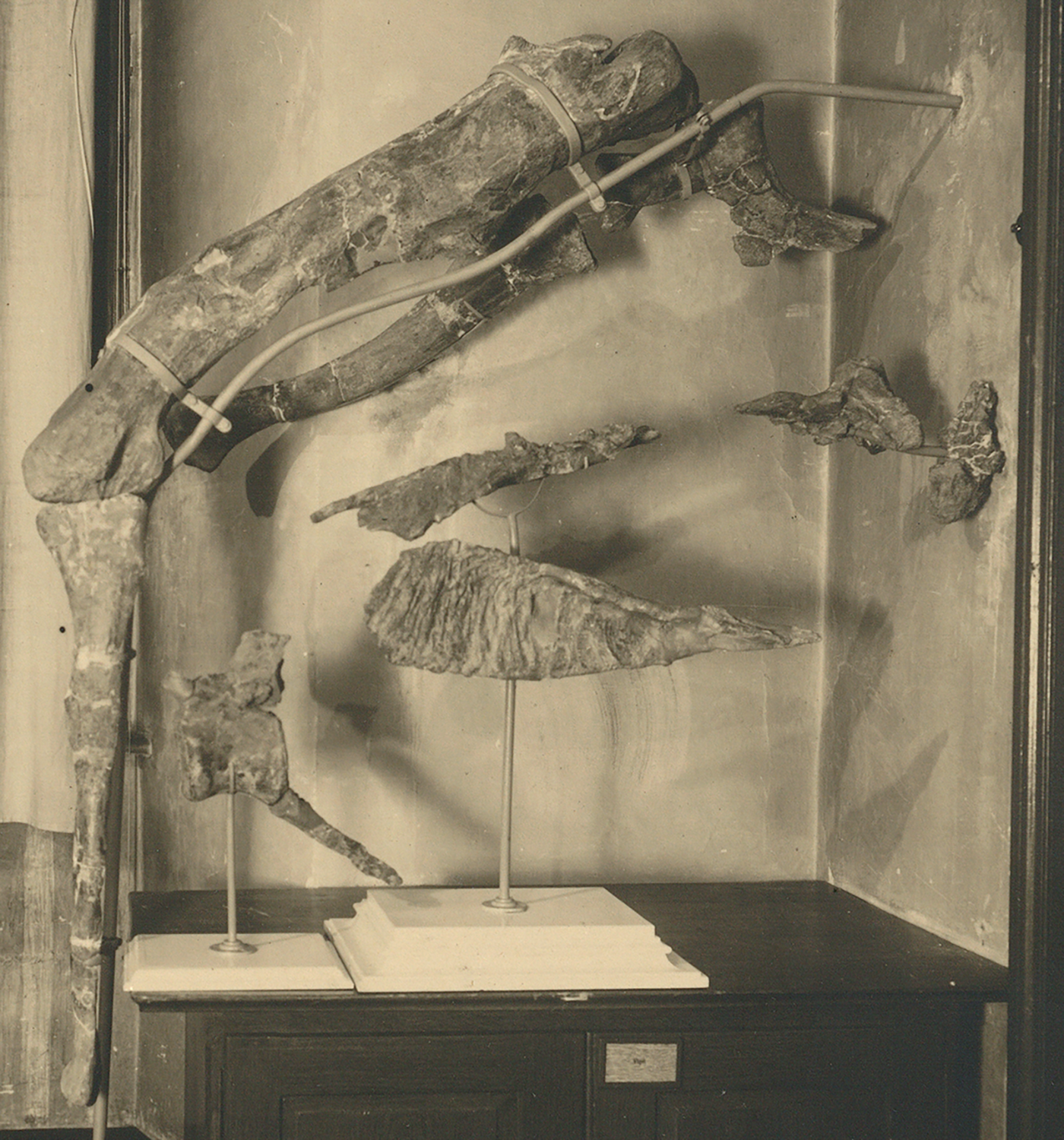
Prior April 1944 photo of the partial skeleton described by Ernst Stromer in 1931, now the holotype of Tameryraptor

However, a partial skeleton later assigned to C. saharicus was first found in marls near Ain Gedid, Egypt, in early April 1914 by Austro-Hungarian paleontologist Richard Markgraf. Marls from this region derive from the Cenomanian-aged Bahariya Formation, one of many Cretaceous-aged sites of North Africa. In this formation, Markgraf did extensive collecting of dinosaur skeletons for his employer, German paleontologist Ernst Stromer of the Paläontologisches Museum München (Bavarian State Collection of Paleontology). In August 1914, war broke out between the German Empire and then British-owned Egypt. As a result, this skeleton, since numbered as SNSB-BSPG 1922 X 46, took years to get to Germany. It was not until 1922 that they were transported overseas to Munich, where they were described by Stromer in 1931.

Stromer recognized that the skeleton's teeth matched the characteristic dentition of those described by Depéret and Savornin, which led to Stromer conserving the species name saharicus. However, he found it necessary to erect a new genus for this species, Carcharodontosaurus, for their similarities, in sharpness and serrations, to the teeth of the great white shark (Carcharodon carcharias). The genus name Carcharodontosaurus is therefore derived from Ancient Greek κάρχαρος (kárkharos), meaning "sharp, jagged", ὀδούς (odoús), meaning "tooth", and σαῦρος (saûros), meaning "lizard", and thus, "sharp-toothed lizard". In his 1931 and 1934 descriptions, Stromer designates the smaller of the two teeth originally described by Depéret and Savornin as the type specimen (name-bearing specimen) of the taxon. Thus, this tooth, although lost, must be considered as the lectotype (a later selected type specimen) of C. saharicus. World War II broke out in 1939, leading SNSB-BSPG 1922 X 46 and other material from Bahariya to be destroyed during a British bombing raid on Munich during the night of April 24/25, 1944. An endocast (cast of the interior of the braincase) was made and survived the war, being the only remaining relic of the specimen.

However in 2025, this specimen was redescribed as the holotype of a distinct carcharodontosaurid genus, Tameryraptor. Following World War II, few major discoveries of Carcharodontosaurus were made. Dozens of isolated teeth and bones were assigned to Carcharodontosaurus from sites across North Africa including in Morocco, Tunisia, Algeria, and Niger, as it was the only carcharodontosaurid known from the region at the time. This led many fossils of carcharodontosaurids found during French geologic expeditions to North Africa to be assigned to Carcharodontosaurus based on little information and traits now found in other genera. This is especially true for isolated teeth, which were believed to be diagnostic for the genus until later research, with a 2012 study by American researcher Matthew Carrano and colleagues stated that all isolated Carcharodontosaurus teeth from the North Africa could only be considered indeterminate carcharodontosaurid teeth due to the presence of other carcharodontosaurid genera in the region. Additionally, very little overlap exists between the C. saharicus neotype and the fossils found on these expeditions, exacerbating this issue. In 1960, French paleontologist Albert-Félix de Lapparent assigned teeth and bones from outcrops of the Continental intercalaire, Echkar Formation, and Irhazer Shale in North Africa to Carcharodontosaurus, however they were assigned to the genus without detailed taxonomic discussion or reasoning. In 1976, a postorbital (skull bone forming right side of orbit) and several postcranial remains assigned to the genus were found in the Elrhaz Formation of northern Niger. French paleontologist Philippe Taquet noted that the postorbital was similar to that of Acrocanthosaurus, another carcharodontosaurid, suggesting it may be from Carcharodontosaurus however the postcranial fossils could belong to a different taxon. Some of the fossils were misidentified, such an isolated pedal phalanx (toe bone) from the Echkar Formation was assigned to Carcharodontosaurus by Lapparent (1960), but it likely is from a spinosaurid instead, and several caudal (tail) vertebrae that may belong to a sauropod. Teeth and a caudal vertebra from the Chenini Formation of southern Tunisia have been assigned to Carcharodontosaurus, though these fossils are now labeled Carcharodontosauridae indet. Additionally, from the Gara Samani Formation, previously a part of the Continental intercalaire, have been identified as Carcharodontosaurus teeth, however they may belong to abelisaurids instead.

=== Resurgent interest ===
Fossil localities of Carcharodontosaurus Legend: C. saharicus C. iguidensis Possible specimens

Few discoveries of Carcharodontosaurus attributed material were made until 1995 when American paleontologist Paul Sereno found an incomplete skull during an expedition embarked on by the University of Chicago. This skull was found in the Cenomanian-aged rocks of the Lower Douira Formation, Kem Kem Beds, in Errachidia, southeastern Morocco. The presence of Carcharodontosaurus in this formation was first suggested in 1954 by French palaeontologist René Lavocat on the basis on fragmentary fossils. The skull, since catalogued as SGM-Din 1 at the Ministry of Energy, Mines and Environment in Rabat, Morocco, was first taken to the University of Chicago, where it was initially described in 1996 by Sereno and colleagues in Science. In 2007, SGM-Din 1 was officially proposed as the neotype (replacement type specimen) of C. saharicus due to the loss of the lectotype teeth and the similar age and geographic location to previously noted material. Several other fossils of C. saharicus have been unearthed from the Kem Kem Beds, such as dentary (lower jaw) fragments, two cervical (neck) vertebrae, and many teeth.

Sereno and colleagues also assigned a multitude of cervical vertebrae described as the spinosaurids Sigilmassasaurus and "Spinosaurus B" to C. saharicus, reasoning that stout cervicals would be needed to carry the skulls of carcharodontosaurids. Later research proved otherwise, with the vertebrae being assigned to Spinosaurus aegyptiacus. In a 2016 study, it was suggested that the neotype of C. saharicus was similar to but distinct from the skeleton described by Stromer in the morphology of the maxillary (upper jaw bone) interdental plates. This conclusion was partially supported by the paper describing Tameryraptor, which noted several major differences between the Moroccan Carcharodontosaurus and the material described by Stromer. Because the neotype proposal was in accordance with the ICZN article 75.3 and 75.4, the describers of Tameryraptor agreed that SGM-Din 1 is a valid neotype.

In 2007, another species of Carcharodontosaurus, C. iguidensis, was described by American paleontologists Steve Brusatte and Paul Sereno. Fossils of C. iguidensis had been uncovered during an expedition to the rock layers of Iguidi, Niger, then identified as part of the Echkar Formation. The partial maxilla (MNN IGU2) was designated the holotype. The species name iguidensis is after Iguidi, where the fossils were unearthed. Several other remains such as a braincase (part of skull surrounding brain), a lacrimal (skull bone in front of orbit), a dentary, a cervical vertebra, and a collection of teeth were assigned to C. iguidensis based on size and supposed similarities to other Carcharodontosaurus bones. However, a 2016 paper by Italian researchers Alfio Alessandro Chiarenza and Andrea Cau identified the non-holotypic material of C. iguidensis as belonging to Sigilmassasaurus and a non-carcharodontosaurine, and therefore chose to limit C. iguidensis to the holotype pending future research. In 2026, Sereno and colleagues assigned some of these specimens to S. mirabilis and re-identified the layers as that of the Farak Formation. This conclusion has been supported by phylogenetic analyses (a study of the evolutionary relationships between taxa), with several finding the holotype and assigned material of C. iguidensis as belonging to different taxa. A 2025 abstract presented by British paleontologist Charlie Scherer and colleagues at the Society of Vertebrate Paleontology annual meeting stated that C. iguidensis is from a distinct genus of carcharodontosaurid due to anatomical, phylogenetic, and biogeographic differences with C. saharicus. The authors went on to state that they would be establishing a new genus for C. iguidensis.

In 2013, another genus and species of carcharodontosaurid, Sauroniops pachytholus, was named by Cau and colleagues based on a single frontal (bone at front and top of skull), though more material may be referrable to the taxon. Sauroniops' validity has been questioned by several papers, with some stating that it is dubious (a species lacking diagnostic features) or a synonym of C. saharicus. This proposed synonymy has been disputed by others. Furthermore, several remains belonging to an unnamed carcharodontosaurid distinct from Carcharodontosaurus, possibly the same as Sauroniops, were described by Paterna and Cau (2022). In 2015, a large neural arch (projection of bone at the top of a vertebra) of a dorsal vertebra from the Kem Kem Beds was informally described as belonging to a new genus and species of megaraptoran or carcharodontosaurid dubbed "Osteoporosia gigantea". This specimen is owned by the head of a Polish theme park chain who described it as belonging to a 15 metres (49 ft) long carnosaur similar to Mapusaurus and Carcharodontosaurus. However, it was much smaller than proposed and may belong to C. saharicus or Sauroniops based on its carcharodontosaurid traits and origin. The South American genus Giganotosaurus was synonymized with Carcharodontosaurus in 1998 by Brazilian author Silvério Domingues Figueiredo and in 2010 by American paleontologist Gregory S. Paul, but no authors have since followed this assessment. In 2026, Sereno and colleagues mentioned the discovery of an associated partial skull and skeleton of Carcharodontosaurus sp. in siltstone strata of the Farak Formation, a Cenomanian-aged fossil formation located in northern Niger. The authors also recalled French geologist Hugues Faure's collection of isolated Carcharodontosaurus-like teeth from the Akarazeras site of the Farak Formation.

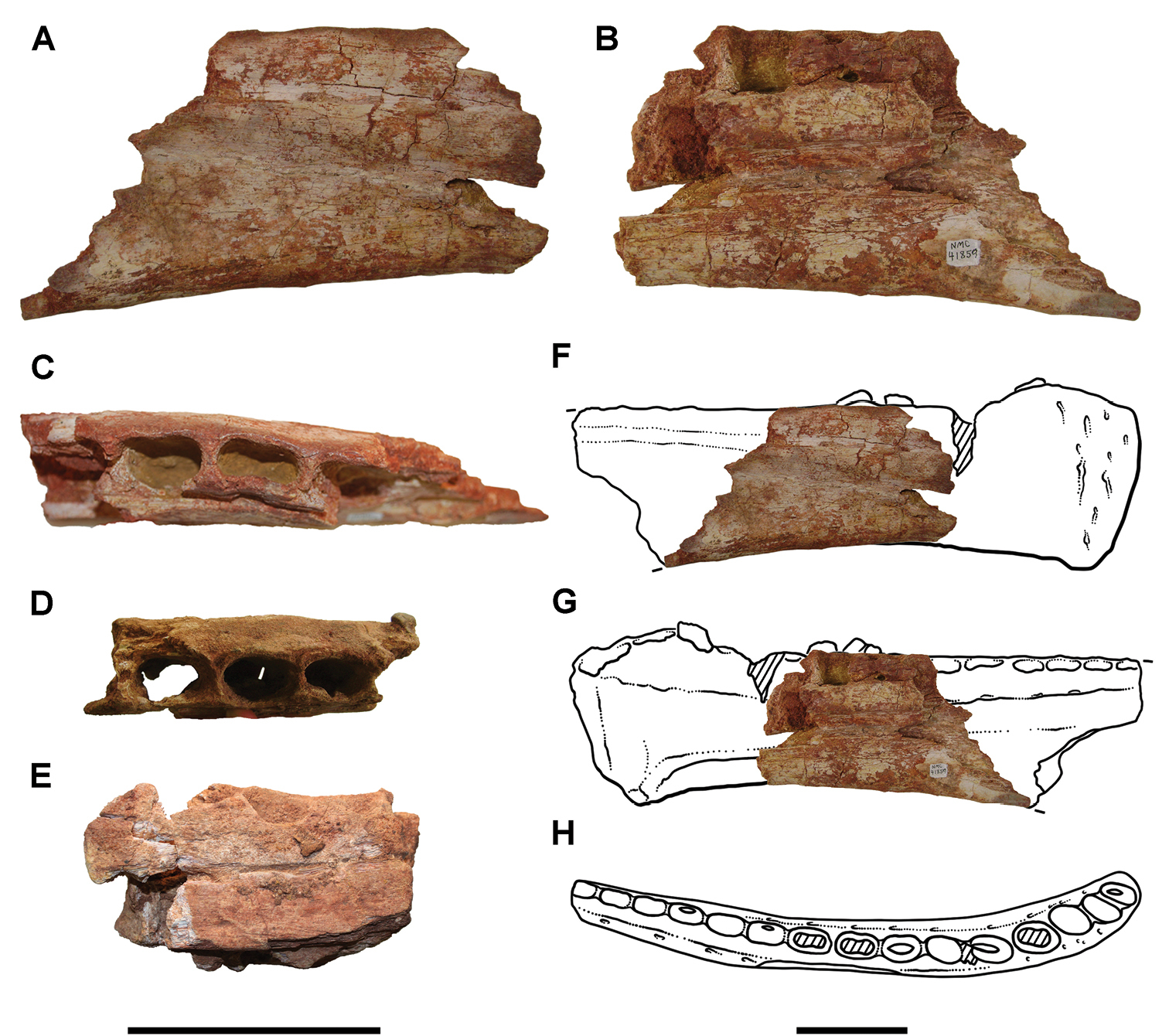
Dentary bone fragments likely belonging to C. saharicus

==== Previously assigned specimens ====
- A maxillary tooth recovered from the Villar del Arzobispo Formation of Spain was assigned to Carcharodontosaurus in 1966. However, it lacks the traits of carcharodontosaurid teeth and instead is more similar to that of other allosauroids.
- In a 1970 study, teeth deriving from the Gokwe Formation of Zimbabwe were described as being similar to those of Carcharodontosaurus. However, later studies have found these teeth to be indeterminate.
- Teeth from the Alcantara Formation and the Itapecuru Group of Brazil have placed in Carcharodontosaurus, but this has been disputed based on its geographic origin and lack of diagnostic features.
- Several vertebral centra (base of vertebrae), a tarsal (bone in the heel), a metatarsal (foot/ankle bone), and a pedal phalanx from Wadi Milk Formation of Sudan were compared Carcharodontosaurus, but were now considered to be indeterminate carcharodontosaurids, some of which are similar to the genus.
- Fossils from the Campanian Quseir Formation of western Egypt have been tentatively assigned to Spinosaurus and Carcharodontosaurus, but these specimens were never described in detail and thus classified as indeterminate.

== Description ==
=== Size ===
Size comparison of giant theropods, C. saharicus in orange, far right

Stromer hypothesized that C. saharicus was around the same size as the tyrannosaurid Gorgosaurus, which placed it at around 8–9 metres (26–30 ft) long, based on his specimen SNSB-BSPG 1922 X 46 (now Tameryraptor). This individual was around 15% smaller than the neotype. The latter was estimated to be 12–12.5 metres (39–41 ft) in length and approximately 5–7 metric tons (5.5–7.7 short tons) in body mass. This makes Carcharodontosaurus saharicus one of the largest known theropod dinosaurs and one of the largest terrestrial carnivores. C. iguidensis was much smaller, only reaching 10 metres (33 ft) in length and 4 metric tons (4.4 short tons) in body mass.

Debate over what was the largest theropod dinosaur has ensued since the mid-1990s, with different researchers arguing that Tyrannosaurus, Carcharodontosaurus, Giganotosaurus, or Spinosaurus was the largest theropod. In 1996, Paul Sereno and colleagues estimated the skull of C. saharicus to be 1.60 metres (5 ft), similar in size to that of Giganotosaurus and possibly longer than that of the Tyrannosaurus specimen "Sue". In an interview for a 1995 article entitled "new beast usurps T. rex as king carnivore", Sereno noted that these newly discovered theropods from South America and Africa competed with Tyrannosaurus as the largest predators, and would help in the understanding of Late Cretaceous dinosaur faunas, which had otherwise been very "North America-centric". A later study by American paleontologist Matthew Carrano and colleagues in 2012 estimated the skull length of C. saharicus to be 1.42 metres (5 ft) long, still slightly longer than that of the largest Tyrannosaurus individuals. In 2010, Gregory S. Paul suggested that the skulls of carcharodontosaurs had been reconstructed as too long in general. In a 1997 interview, Argentine paleontologist Rodolfo Coria estimated Giganotosaurus to have been 13.7 to 14.3 metres (45 to 47 ft) long and weighing 8–10 metric tons (8.8–11.0 short tons) based on new material, larger than Carcharodontosaurus. Sereno countered that it would be difficult to determine a size range for a species based on few, incomplete specimens, and both paleontologists agreed that other aspects of these dinosaurs were more important than settling the "size contest". In 2007, Canadian researcher François Therrien and American researcher Donald M. Henderson found that Giganotosaurus would have approached 13 metres (43 ft) in length and 13.8 t (15.2 short tons) in weight, while Carcharodontosaurus would have approached 13.3 metres (44 ft) in length and 15.1 t (16.6 short tons) in weight (surpassing both Tyrannosaurus and Giganotosaurus). In 2022,Canale and colleagues estimated the skull length of C.saharicus at 1.4–1.6 metres (4.6–5.2 ft) in length,based off extrapolations from the more complete relative Meraxes.

=== Skull ===
==== Cranium and teeth ====
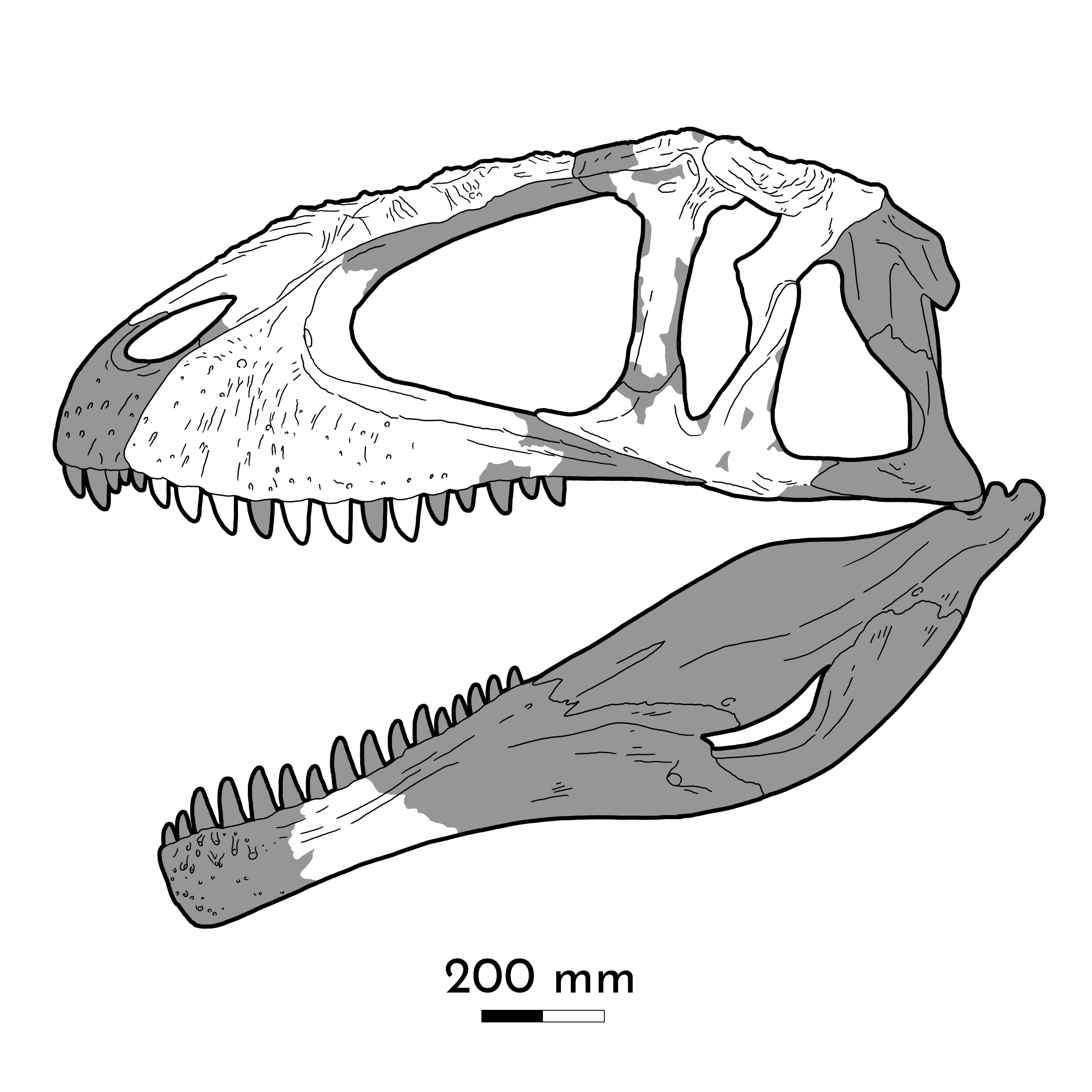
Reconstructed skull of C. saharicus, showing known material in white

The neotype skull of C. saharicus would measure 1.6 metres (5.2 ft) when complete, around the same size as the largest Tyrannosaurus skulls. No skulls of the genus preserve premaxillae, complete posterior skull regions, or mandibles. Skulls of carcharodontosaurids tend to be more slender and lightly built than those of later tyrannosaurids, which have robust builds and adaptations for crushing. The neotype cranium tapers towards the front in side view creating a triangular outline. This is similar to that of other carcharodontosaurids like Mapusaurus and Giganotosaurus. Its skull was lighter than that of tyrannosaurids, with the antorbital fenestra composing over 30% of the total skull length as well as being surrounded by fossae in the maxillae, nasals (nose bone), jugals (cheekbone), and lacrimals (front orbit bone). Akin to other genera, its nasal is elongated and its exposed side is covered in a rugose surface. These bumps were likely extended by keratin sheaths, creating a horn-like structure as in Ceratosaurus. A similar rugosity is found on the lacrimal which would also be lengthened by keratin, forming a similar element. Carcharodontosaurus' skull has sculpted exteriors on its maxillae, which is a trait unique to the genus. C. iguidensis has antorbital fossae limited to the proximity of the maxillary fenestrae (a gap in the skull in the maxilla), crests running along the outer face of the maxillae, and a process along the anteriomedial section of the maxillae. Additionally, the braincase of C. iguidensis has a deep fossa on the anterior end on the upper ridge of the laterosphenoid. These traits are missing in C. saharicus, differentiating the two species.

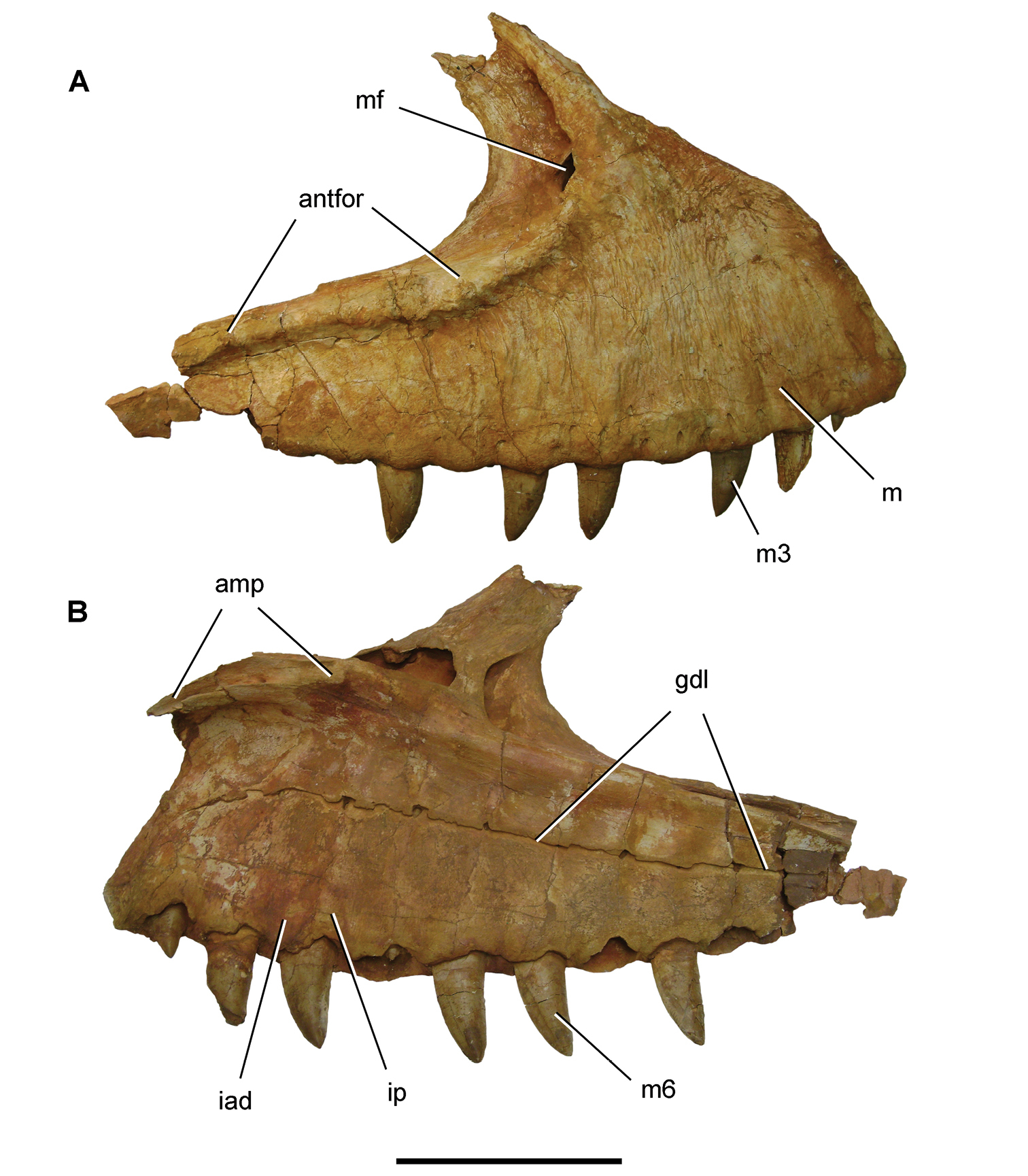
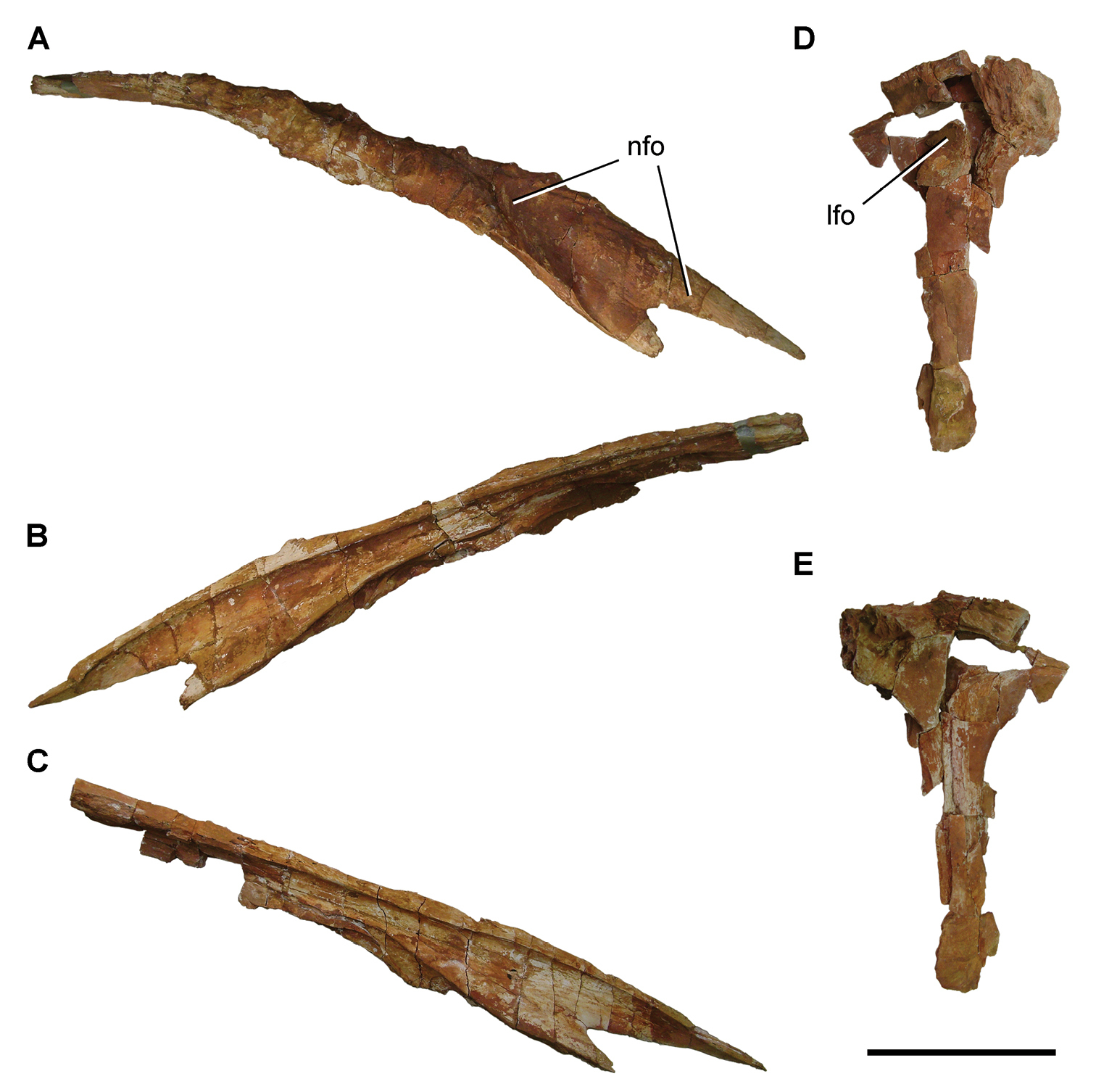
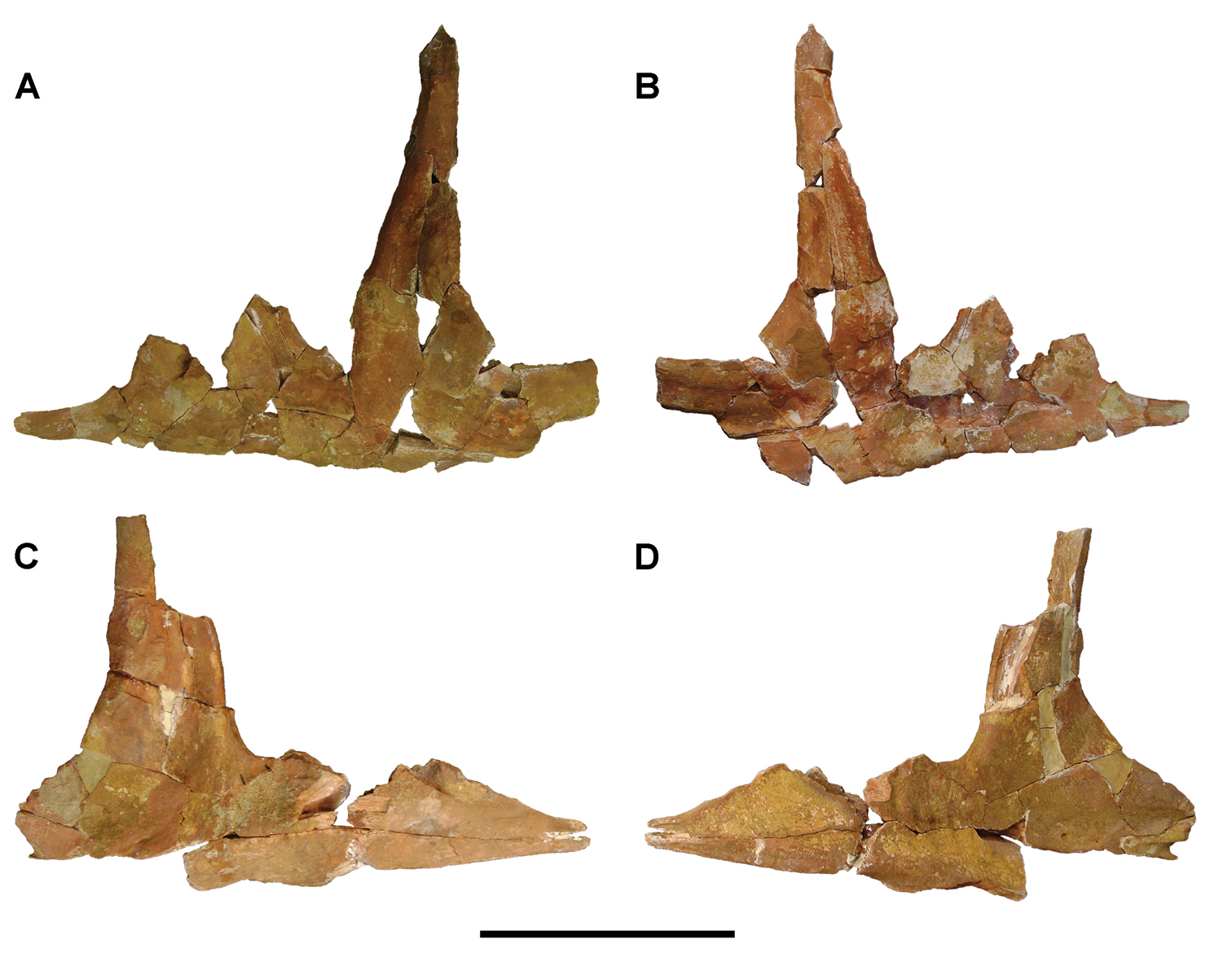
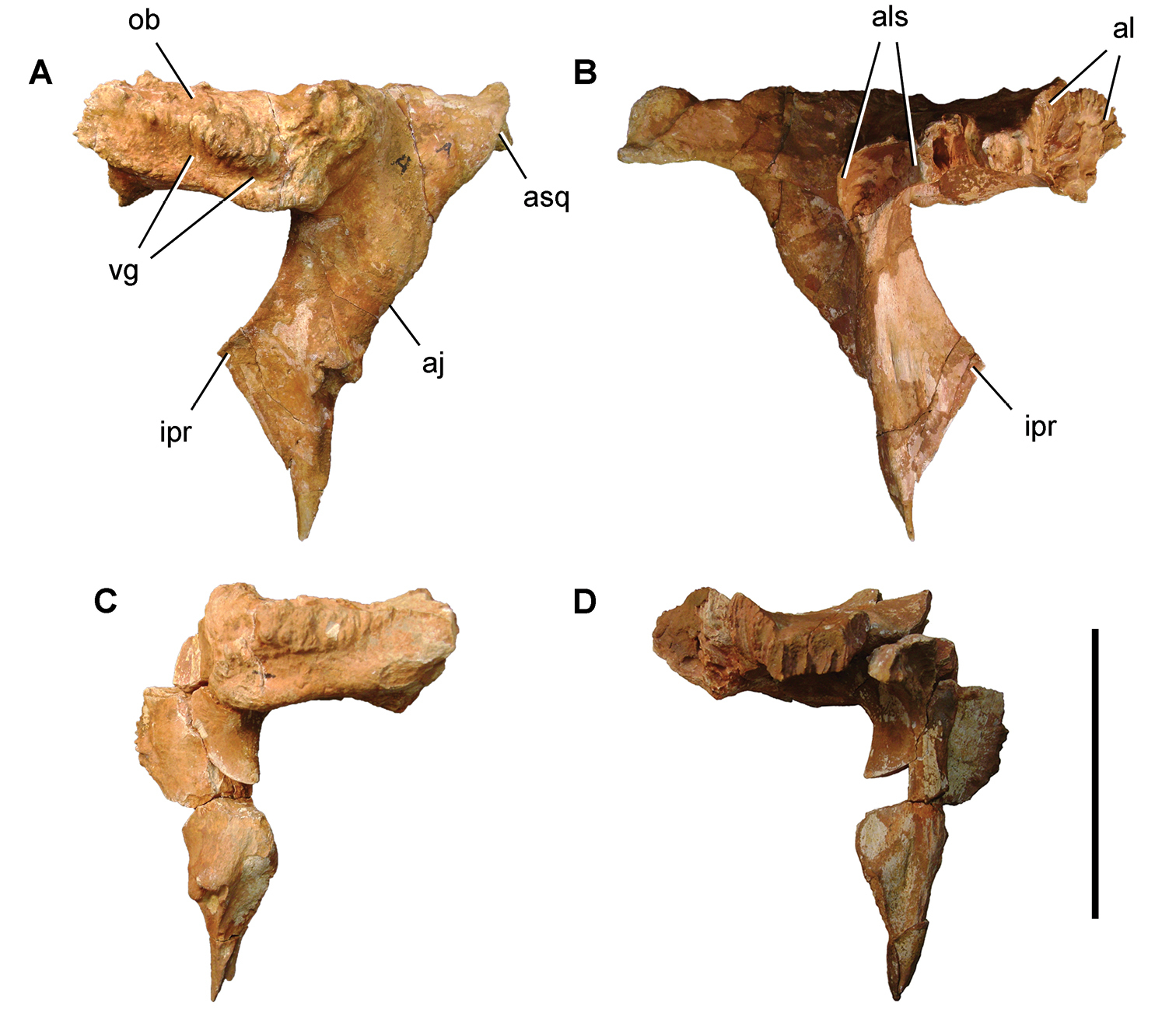
Skull bones of the neotype specimen; right maxilla (upper left), nasal and lacrimal (upper right), jugals (lower left), and postorbitals (lower right)

14 teeth sockets are present in each maxilla. Parts of the braincase are known though much of their morphology is the same as Giganotosaurus'. However, C. saharicus has a much more prominent nuchal crest, which overhangs the skull roof. The frontal bones are firmly fused, a characteristic evident in most theropods. The jugals are broad and triangle-shaped. The lower jaw articulation was placed farther back behind the occipital condyle (where the neck is attached to the skull) compared to other theropods. Two dentary (lower jaw bone) fragments which were assigned to C. saharicus by Ibrahim and colleagues in 2020 have deep and expanded alveoli (tooth sockets), traits found in other large theropods. If like Tyrannotitan and Giganotosaurus, the dentary would have 16 alveoli (tooth sockets).

Estimations of the tooth count of Carcharodontosaurus vary, but a recent estimate of 30 dentary, 8 premaxillary, and 24 maxillary teeth for a total of 62 teeth was made. Carcharodontosaurus teeth are some of the largest of any dinosaur group, with the lectotype maxillary tooth being 6.5 centimetres (2.6 in) tall, 1.5 centimetres (0.59 in) thick, and 3.2 centimetres (1.3 in) wide. The crown base length of their teeth exceeds most other known theropods. However, they are extremely thin, with most being under or around a centimetre thick. Serrations are numerous on the anterior and posterior margins, with over 18 to 20 serrations per centimetre of edge in C. saharicus and up to 32 per centimetre in C. iguidensis. The teeth are straight and spindle-shaped in cross-section. However, dentition towards the back of the mouth became more recurved than those towards the front of the mouth. The posterior margin of these crowns are recurved and convex at its termination. Bowed enamel wrinkles are present on both dorsoventral sides of the crowns. These wrinkles curve towards the marginal serrations, composing a band-shape along the ends. Carcharodontosaurus and Giganotosaurus have some of the most exaggerated enamel wrinkles of any theropod, especially on parts of the teeth near the serrations. One of Carcharodontosaurus' diagnostic traits (characteristics used to differentiate one genus/species from another) is the presence of enamel wrinkles on teeth throughout the upper jaw, not just on the broadest teeth like in Giganotosaurus.

==== Brain and inner ear ====
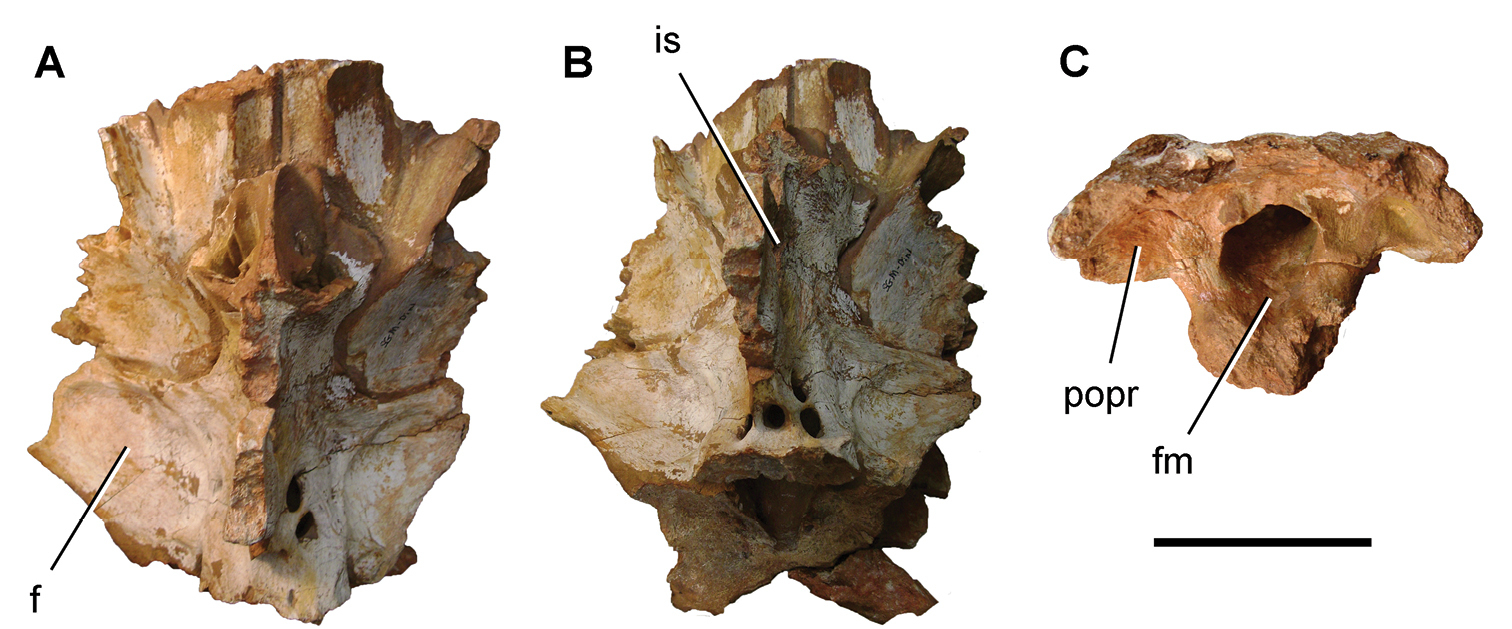
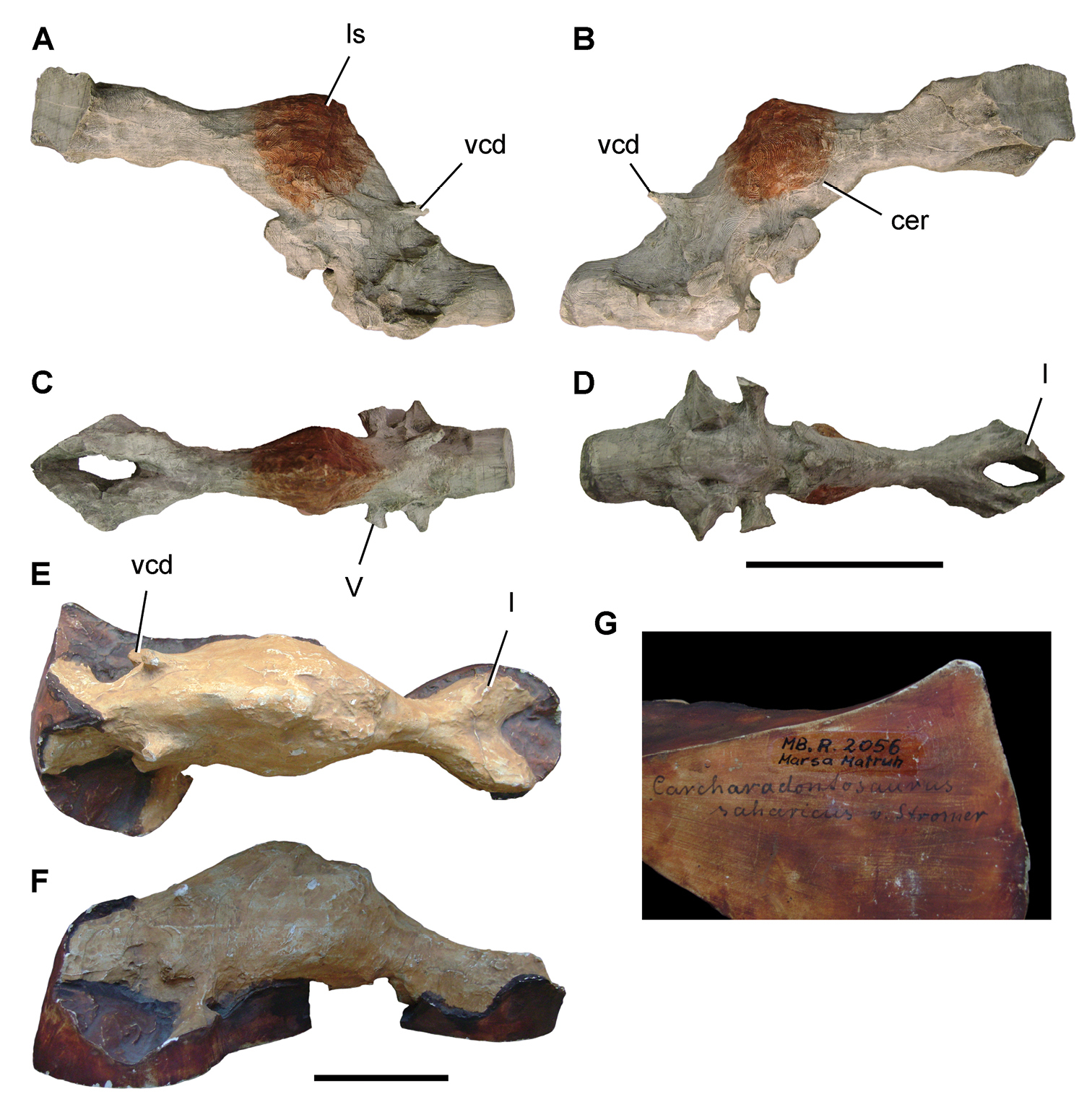
Braincase of the neotype (above), with endocasts of same (A–D) and MB. R. 2056 (E–F) below

In 2001, Canadian paleontologist Hans C. E. Larsson published a description of the inner ear and endocranium of C. saharicus. The brain of Carcharodontosaurus is made up of three main sections: the forebrain, the anteriormost section, the midbrain, the middle section, and the hindbrain, the posteriormost section. The midbrain is angled downwards at a 45-degree angle and towards the rear of the animal. This is followed by the hindbrain, which is roughly parallel to the forebrain and forms a roughly 40-degree angle with the midbrain. Overall, the brain of C. saharicus would have been similar to that of a related dinosaur, Allosaurus fragilis. Larsson found that the ratio of the cerebrum to the volume of the brain overall in Carcharodontosaurus was typical for a non-avian reptile. Carcharodontosaurus also had a large optic nerve.

The three semicircular canals of the inner ear of Carcharodontosaurus saharicus—when viewed from the side—had a subtriangular outline. This subtriangular inner-ear configuration is present in Allosaurus, lizards, and turtles, but not in birds. The semi-"circular" canals themselves were very linear, which explains the pointed silhouette. In life, the floccular lobe of the brain would have projected into the area surrounded by the semicircular canals, just like in theropods and pterosaurs.

=== Postcrania ===
Few postcranial elements are confidently known from Carcharodontosaurus, though many isolated bones from the Sahara have been assigned to the genus without detailed study. However, the description of other carcharodontosaurids from North Africa such as Tameryraptor and Sauroniops has put into question the referral of carcharodontosaurid remains that lack overlap with the C. saharicus neotype. Like other carcharodontosaurids, it was robust with small forelimbs, an elongated tail, and short neck. A single cervical vertebra was assigned to the genus by Canadian researcher Dale A. Russell in 1996. This cervical vertebra is stout and opisthocoelus (concave posterior ends). Its preserved length is 148 millimetres (5.8 in). As in Giganotosaurus, the vertebra is topped by a low neural spine (a dorsal projection of bone forming a spine) joined with sturdy transverse processes (projections of bone coming out of the sides of the centrum) which hung over the pleurocoels (shallow depressions on the sides of centra), which would contain pneumatic air sacs to lighten the vertebrae. The centrum however lacks the keels observed in other carcharodontosaurids, possibly due to it being an anterior cervical vertebra. Another incomplete cervical vertebra was tentatively assigned to the genus by Cau and colleagues (2025) on the basis of its stratigraphic and geographic position. The vertebra is likely from the 4th to 6th position in the cervical column and shares general morphology, size, and proportions with cervicals of Acrocanthosaurus.

== Classification ==
=== Systematics ===
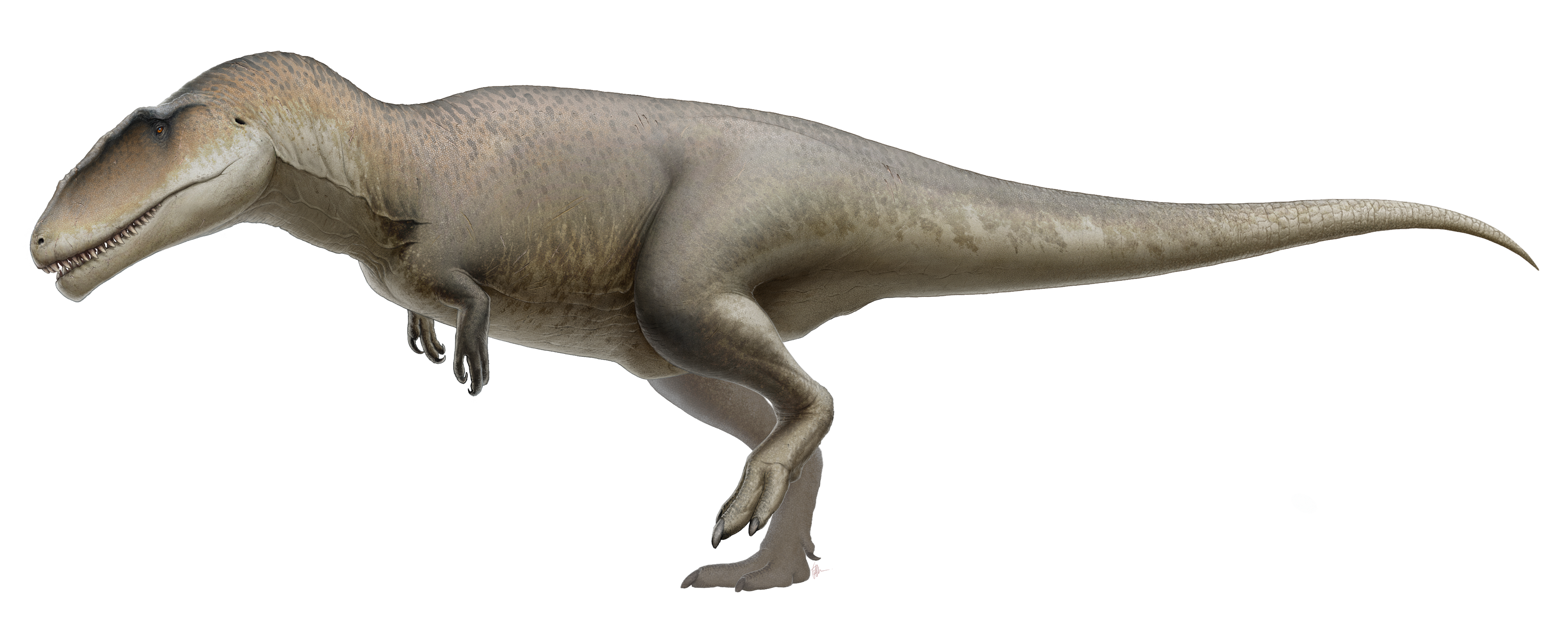
Life restoration of C. saharicus

Carcharodontosaurus is the type genus of the family Carcharodontosauridae and subfamily Carcharodontosaurinae. This subfamily contains Carcharodontosaurus itself as well as the other carcharodontosaurines Giganotosaurus, Mapusaurus, Meraxes, and Tyrannotitan; however, these genera make up an independent tribe: Giganotosaurini. Carcharodontosauridae was a clade created by Stromer for Carcharodontosaurus and Bahariasaurus, though the name remained unused until the recognition of other members of the group in the late 20th century. He noted the likeness of Carcharodontosaurus bones to the American theropods Allosaurus and Tyrannosaurus, leading him to consider the family part of Theropoda. From the 1950s to the 1980s, Carcharodontosaurus was classified as a member of Megalosauridae, another family of carnivorous theropods, alongside theropods like Antrodemus/Allosaurus, Megalosaurus, and Eustreptospondylus.

In a 1995 paper, German researcher Oliver Rauhut analyzed the systematics of Carcharodontosaurus—though this was based on the material now assigned to Tameryraptor—and Bahariasaurus. Rauhut theorized that Carcharodontosaurus and Bahariasaurus were the only two named members of Carcharodontosauridae, but that the family may have originated in Tanzania. This was based on "Allosaurus" tendagurensis and "Megalosaurus" ingens, which are two theropods known from fragmentary remains from the Late Jurassic Tendaguru Formation. However, later studies have not supported these conclusions, with Bahariasaurus being suggested to be a ceratosaur, "A." tendagurensis being an indeterminate tetanuran, and "M." ingens possibly being a species of Torvosaurus.

Paul Sereno's description of Carcharodontosaurus fossils in 1996 led to the realization of a transcontinental clade of carcharodontosaurids. As more carcharodontosaurids were discovered, their interrelationships became even clearer. The group was defined as all allosauroids closer to Carcharodontosaurus than Allosaurus or Sinraptor by the American paleontologist Thomas R. Holtz and colleagues in 2004. Carcharodontosaurus is less well-known than most other carcharodontosaurids, with Meraxes and Giganotosaurus represented by nearly complete skeletons. Carcharodontosaurians have been recognized from the Late Jurassic to the Mid-Cretaceous of every continent except Antarctica.

In the phylogenetic analyses of their 2025 paper, Kellermann, Cuesta and Rauhut recovered C. iguidensis as a non-carcharodontosaurine member of the Carcharodontosauridae outside the genus Carcharodontosaurus, suggesting that this species belongs to a different genus. Similar results were recovered by Cau and Paterna in their analysis of large Cretaceous theropods from Africa, who also argued for the removal of C. iguidensis from the genus.

The 2025 analyses of Kellermann, Cuesta and Rauhut found support for a sister taxon relationship of carcharodontosaurids and metriacanthosaurids, which the authors named as a new clade, Carcharodontosauriformes. The results of their analysis using merged OTUs (operational taxonomic units; a group of organisms under phylogenetic study) are displayed in the cladogram (a graphical depiction of the results of a phylogenetic study) below:

- Carcharodontosauriformes
  - Metriacanthosauridae
  - Carcharodontosauridae
    - - Lusovenator
      - Lajasvenator
    - - Acrocanthosaurus
      - - Tameryraptor
        - - Carcharodontosaurus iguidensis
          - Carcharodontosaurinae
            - - Taurovenator
              - Carcharodontosaurus saharicus
            - Giganotosaurini
              - Meraxes
              - - Tyrannotitan
                - - Mapusaurus
                  - Giganotosaurus

=== Evolution ===
Argentine paleontologists Rodolfo Coria and Leonardo Salgado suggested that the convergent evolution of gigantism in theropods could have been linked to common conditions in their environments or ecosystems. Sereno and colleagues found that the presence of carcharodontosaurids in Africa (Carcharodontosaurus), North America (Acrocanthosaurus), and South America (Giganotosaurus), showed the group had a transcontinental distribution by the Early Cretaceous period. Dispersal routes between the northern and southern continents appear to have been severed by ocean barriers in the Late Cretaceous, which led to more distinct, provincial faunas, by preventing exchange. Previously, it was thought that the Cretaceous world was biogeographically separated, with the northern continents being dominated by tyrannosaurids, South America by abelisaurids, and Africa by carcharodontosaurids. The subfamily Carcharodontosaurinae, in which Carcharodontosaurus belongs, appears to have been restricted to the southern continent of Gondwana (formed by South America and Africa), where they were probably the apex predators. The South American tribe Giganotosaurini may have been separated from their African relatives through vicariance, when Gondwana broke up during the Aptian–Albian ages of the Early Cretaceous.

== Paleobiology ==
=== Lifting capabilities ===
A biomechanical analysis of Carcharodontosaurus' lifting capabilities was conducted by American paleontologists Donald Henderson and Robert Nicholls in 2015. The authors used 3D models of the animal as well as a subadult sauropod Limaysaurus, which although not found alongside Carcharodontosaurus, is similar to the rebbachisaurids of the Kem Kem Beds. The models included the size of the lungs and other pneumatic structures of the two, fostering an accurate weight simulation of the scenario. Henderson and Nicholls' study found that an adult C. saharicus could hold a maximum of 424 kg (935 lb), half the weight of an adult Limaysaurus. However, two C. saharicus adults could together lift as much as 850 kilograms (1,870 lb).

=== Feeding and diet ===
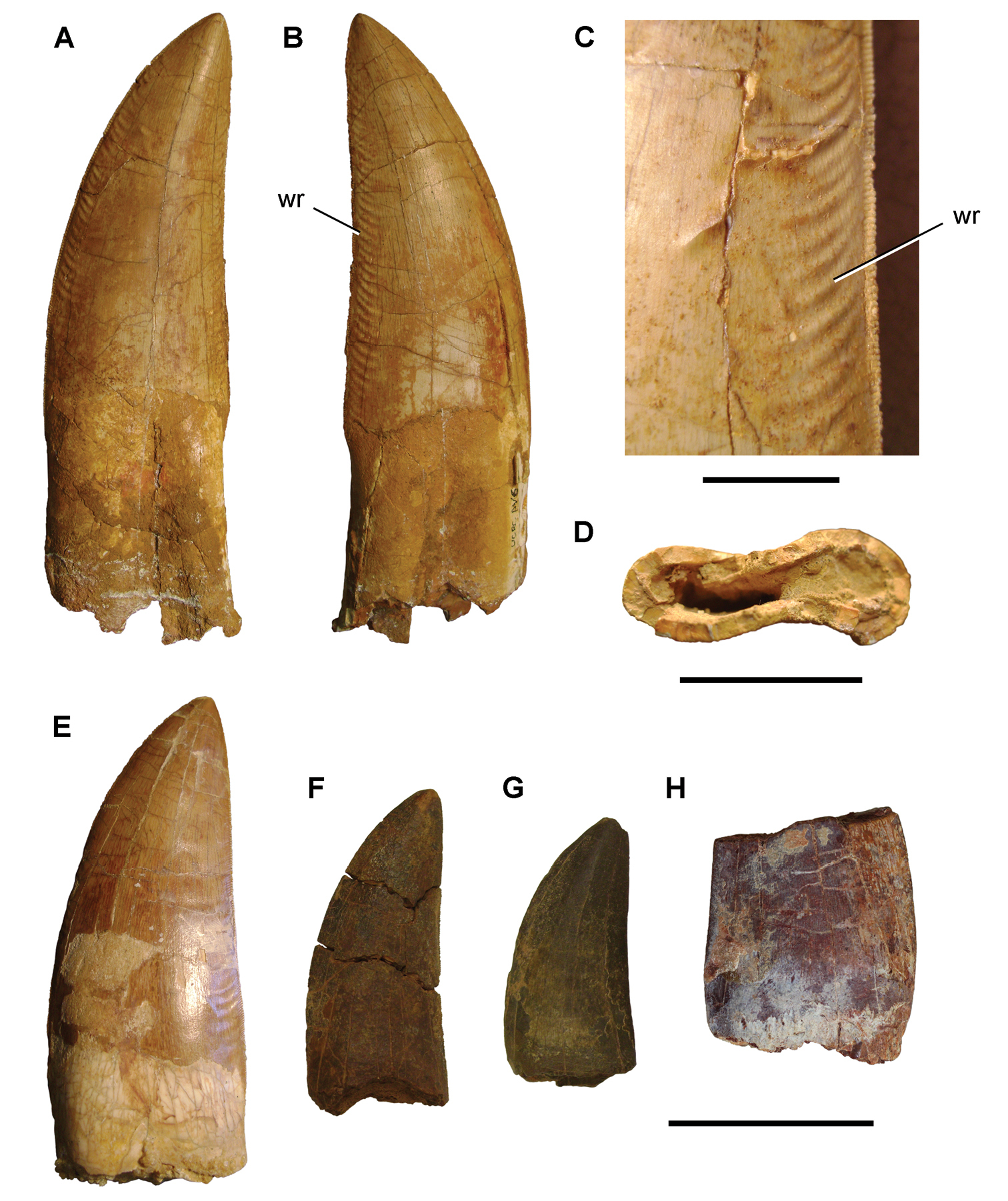
Teeth assigned to Carcharodontosaurus

The dentition of allosauroids is distinct, with carcharodontosaurid teeth being uniquely thin and blade-like. However, their thin nature mean they likely could not sustain impact against hard surfaces like bone without potentially bending and snapping. This danger is exacerbated by the straight edges, slightly recurved tips, and sinusoidal shapes observed in their dentition. Despite these traits, the teeth are still much more robust than those of smaller theropods and due to their overall size could take more pressure. Carcharodontosaurus also had a high tooth replacement rate, meaning that damaged teeth could be replaced easily in contrast to extant bone-crushing mammals who spend much of their energy maintaining their teeth. In a 2015 study on dinosaur tooth function, teeth of Carcharodontosaurus, Tyrannosaurus, and a variety of other dinosaurs were analyzed by X-ray microscopy. The internal microstructures of Carcharodontosaurus enamel were shown to have cracked enamel tufts near the dentinoenamel junction, a trait that may have made the teeth more damage resistant and crack shielding, similar to that of humans. Evidence of bone-crunching bites is observed in Allosaurus, which would engage in ritual face-biting with other individuals and bite into the pelves of Stegosaurus as shown by bite marks.

Bite forces of Carcharodontosaurus as well as other giant theropods including Acrocanthosaurus and Tyrannosaurus have been analyzed. Studies reported that carcharodontosaurids had much lower bite forces than Tyrannosaurus despite being in the same size class. The anterior bite force of C. saharicus was estimated in a 2022 paper to be 11,312 newtons while the posterior bite force was 25,449 newtons. This is much lower than that of Tyrannosaurus, implying that it did not eat bones. Finite element accounts of the skulls of theropods have also been taken, which further supported the idea that Carcharodontosaurus ate softer food than tyrannosaurids. Great amounts of stress were recovered in the posterior part of the cranium near the quadrate in Carcharodontosaurus, Spinosaurus, and Acrocanthosaurus. The skulls of these theropods had higher relative stress quantities in opposition to that of smaller genera. This indicates that the crania of giant taxa (ex. Carcharodontosaurus) were unstable due to having large pneumatic structures to save weight instead of creating a firm build. However, Spinosaurus and Suchomimus experienced even greater values of stress meaning that they could only consume light, small prey instead of larger items, which the stronger skull of Carcharodontosaurus could bite while sustaining the stress.

Isotopic analyses of the teeth of C. saharicus have found δ18O values that are higher than that of the contemporary Spinosaurus, suggesting the latter pursued semi-aquatic habits whereas Carcharodontosaurus was more terrestrial. This is further supported by the taphonomy of C. saharicus teeth, which are more often found in land terrains than aquatic ones. Carcharodontosaurus was also a homeotherm with an endotherm-like thermophysiology as inferred by these isotopes meaning that most of its oxygen was accumulated by drinking water rather than being in it.

=== Orbit ===
In many large-skulled theropods, the orbits bear unusual shapes and are nearly divided into dorsal and ventral sections. However, the purpose of this large, split orbit is unknown. In Carcharodontosaurus, Abelisaurus, and some other theropods, this is created by an anterior projection of the postorbital bone into the orbit. In 1998, American paleontologist Daniel Chure suggested that these projections were caused by the ligamentum suborbitale, a thin ligament in birds that forms the ventrolateral (bottom-side) wall of the orbit. Most of the theropods with split orbits also have bony projections which overhang the orbit dorsally, such as horns in Carnotaurus and a bony shelf in Carcharodontosaurus. In his study, Chure recounted the idea that the horns of Carnotaurus were used for "head-butting fights" and suggested that theropods with bony shelves above their orbits, like Carcharodontosaurus, did the same. Chure went on to suggest that the orbit size may indicate niche partitioning, with large-headed theropods like Carcharodontosaurus being diurnal whereas smaller forms like Stenonychosaurus were nocturnal or crepuscular.

=== Vision ===
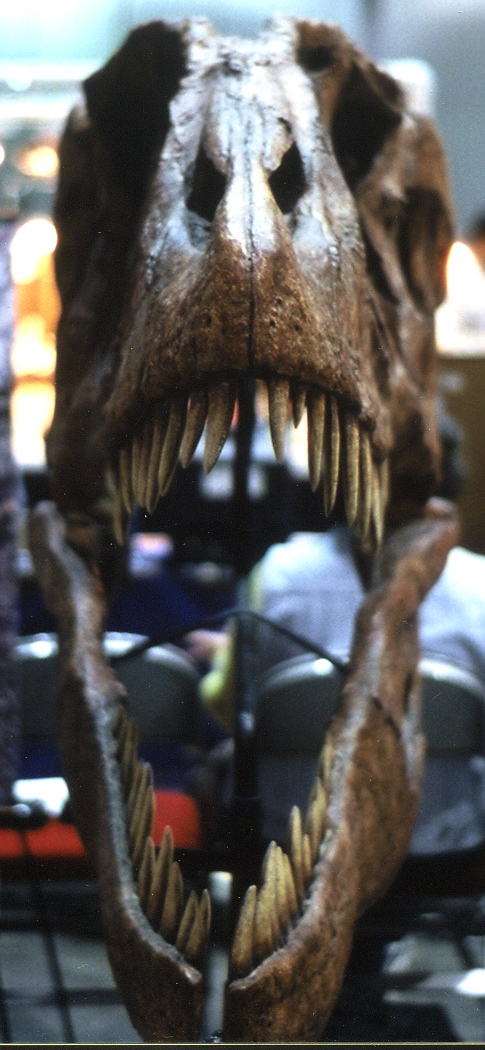
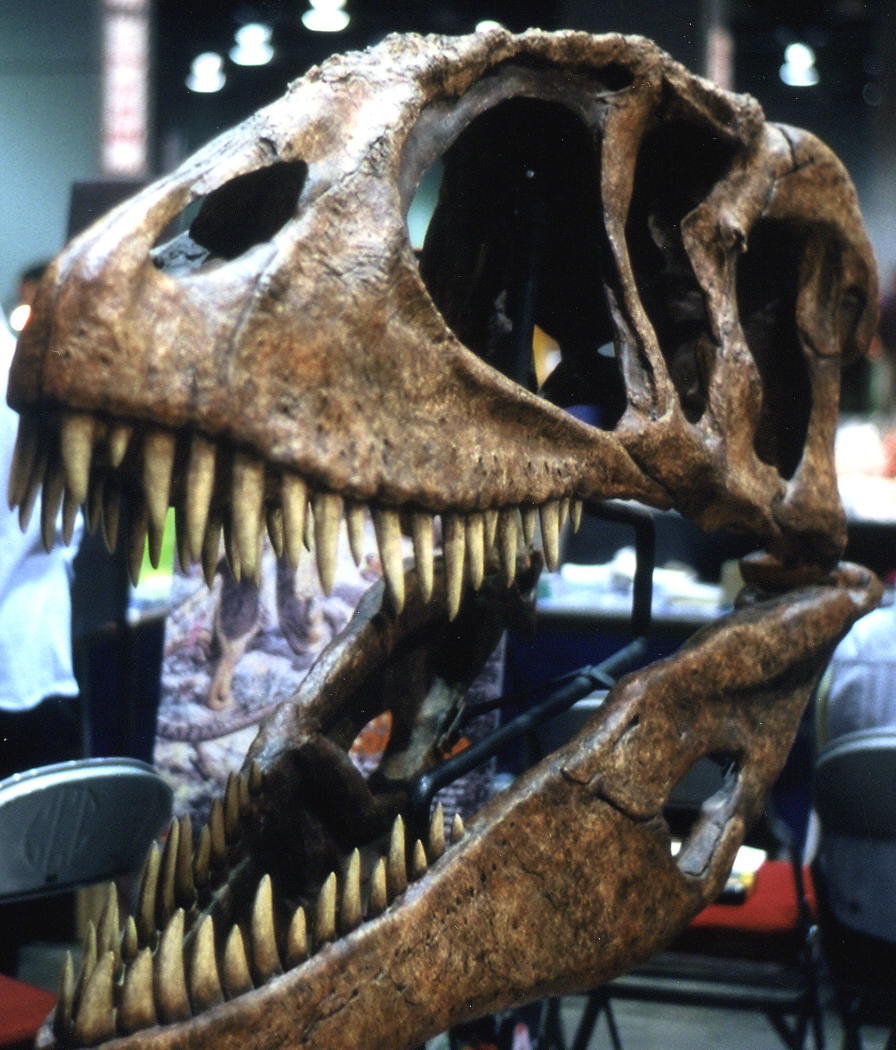
Skull of C. saharicus showing its elongated, thin rostrum and limited degree of binocular vision

A 2006 study by American biologist Kent Stevens analyzed the binocular vision capabilities of the allosauroids Carcharodontosaurus and Allosaurus as well as several coelurosaurs including Tyrannosaurus and Stenonychosaurus. By applying modified perimetry to models of these dinosaurs' heads, Stevens deduced that the binocular vision of Carcharodontosaurus was limited, a side effect of its large, elongated rostrum. Its greatest degree of binocular vision was at higher elevations, suggesting that Carcharodontosaurus may have habitually held its head at a downward 40° angle with its eyes facing up accordingly to achieve maximum binocular vision. The range of vision seen in these allosauroids is comparable to that of crocodiles, suggesting that they were ambush predators. They likely sensed prey via motion parallax between prey and background, with a narrow binocular field of vision helping predators judge prey distances and time attacks.

=== Pathology ===
The neotype skull of C. saharicus is one of many allosauroid individuals to preserve pathologies, with signs of biting, infection, and breaks observed in Allosaurus and Acrocanthosaurus among others. This skull bears a circular puncture wound in the nasal and an unusual bony projection coming from the nasal's antorbital rim, which a later study stated could be a bite mark.

== Paleoenvironment ==
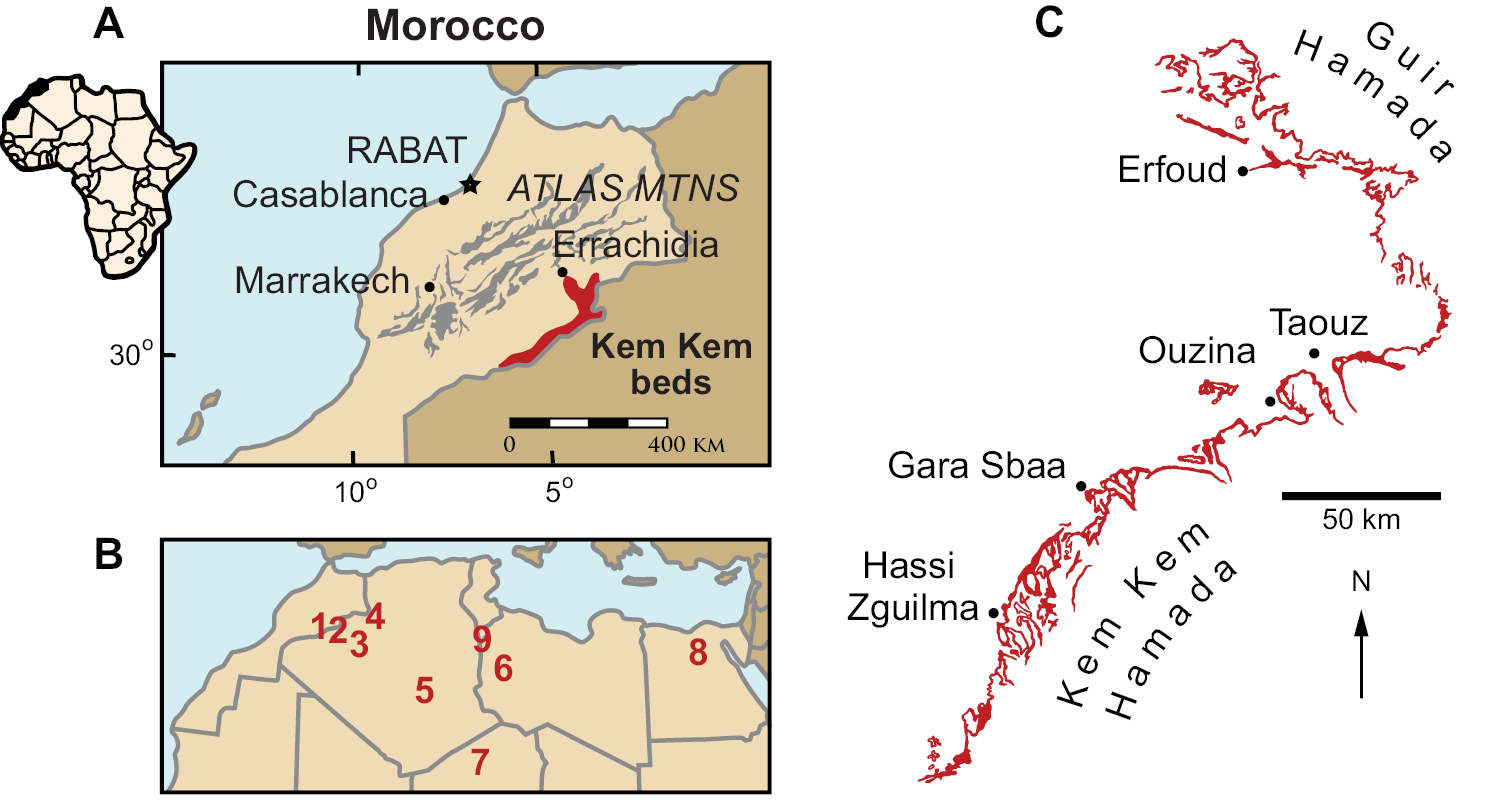
Geographical setting of the Kem Kem region and its outcrops

Fossils of Carcharodontosaurus are known from several Cretaceous-age sites across North Africa, similar to the ranges of Spinosaurus and Deltadromeus. North Africa during this period bordered the Tethys Sea, which transformed the region into a mangrove-dominated coastal environment filled with vast tidal flats and waterways. Isotopes from Carcharodontosaurus and Spinosaurus fossils suggest that the Kem Kem Beds witnessed a temporary monsoon season rather than constant rainfall, similar to modern conditions present in sub-tropical and tropical environments in Southeast Asia and Sub-Saharan Africa. These riverine deposits bore large fishes, including the sawskate Onchopristis, coelacanth Axelrodichthys, and bichir Bawitius. This led to an abundance of piscivorous crocodyliformes evolving in response, such as the giant stomatosuchid Stomatosuchus in Egypt and the genera Elosuchus, Laganosuchus, and Aegisuchus from Morocco. Morocco also bore an abundance of pterosaurs like Siroccopteryx and Nicorhynchus.

The composition of the dinosaur fauna of these sites is an anomaly, as there are fewer herbivorous dinosaur species relative to carnivorous dinosaurs than usual. This indicates that there was niche partitioning between the different theropod clades, with spinosaurids consuming fish while other groups hunted herbivorous dinosaurs. Isotopic evidence supports this, which found greater quantities of sizable, terrestrial animals in the diets of carcharodontosaurids and ceratosaurs from both the Kem Kem Beds and Elrhaz Formation. It also coexisted with the sauropod Rebbachisaurus which is found in the Kem Kem Beds. Carcharodontosaurids are represented by C. saharicus and Sauroniops in the Kem Kem Beds, Tameryraptor in the Bahariya Formation, Eocarcharia and potentially Carcharodontosaurus in the Elrhaz Formation, and C. iguidensis in the Farak Formation, initially identified as the layers of the Echkar Formation. A tooth found alongside the holotype of the sauropod Paralititan was assigned to cf. Carcharodontosaurus by American paleontologist Joshua Smith and colleagues in 2001. This tooth was theorized to be found with the Paralititan individual due to scavenging. These fossils were unearthed in a site in the Bahariya Formation, where all fossils of Carcharodontosaurus were reassigned to Tameryraptor, however this tooth specifically has not received further attention.

== Bibliography ==
- Stromer, Ernst (1934). "Ergebnisse der Forschungsreisen Prof. E. Stromers in den Wüsten Ägyptens. II. Wirbeltier-Reste der Baharije-Stufe (unterstes Cenoman). 13. Dinosauria" [Results of Prof. E. Stromer's research trips in the deserts of Egypt. II. Vertebrate remains from the Baharîje stage (lower Cenomanian). 13. Dinosauria] (PDF). Abhandlungen der Bayerischen Akademie der Wissenschaften Mathematisch-naturwissenschaftliche Abteilung. Neue Folge (in German). 22: 1–79.
- Nothdurft, William; Smith, Josh (2002). The Lost Dinosaurs of Egypt. New York: Random House Publishing Group. ISBN 978-1-58836-117-2.
- Carrano, Matthew T.; Benson, Roger B.J.; Sampson, Scott D. (2012). "The phylogeny of Tetanurae (Dinosauria: Theropoda)". Journal of Systematic Palaeontology. 10 (2): 211–300. Bibcode:2012JSPal..10..211C. doi:10.1080/14772019.2011.630927. ISSN 1477-2019. S2CID 85354215.
- Ibrahim, Nizar; Sereno, Paul C.; Varricchio, David J.; Martill, David M.; Dutheil, Didier B.; Unwin, David M.; Baidder, Lahssen; Larsson, Hans C. E.; Zouhri, Samir; Kaoukaya, Abdelhadi (2020). "Geology and paleontology of the Upper Cretaceous Kem Kem Group of eastern Morocco". ZooKeys (928): 1–216. Bibcode:2020ZooK..928....1I. doi:10.3897/zookeys.928.47517. PMC 7188693. PMID 32362741.
