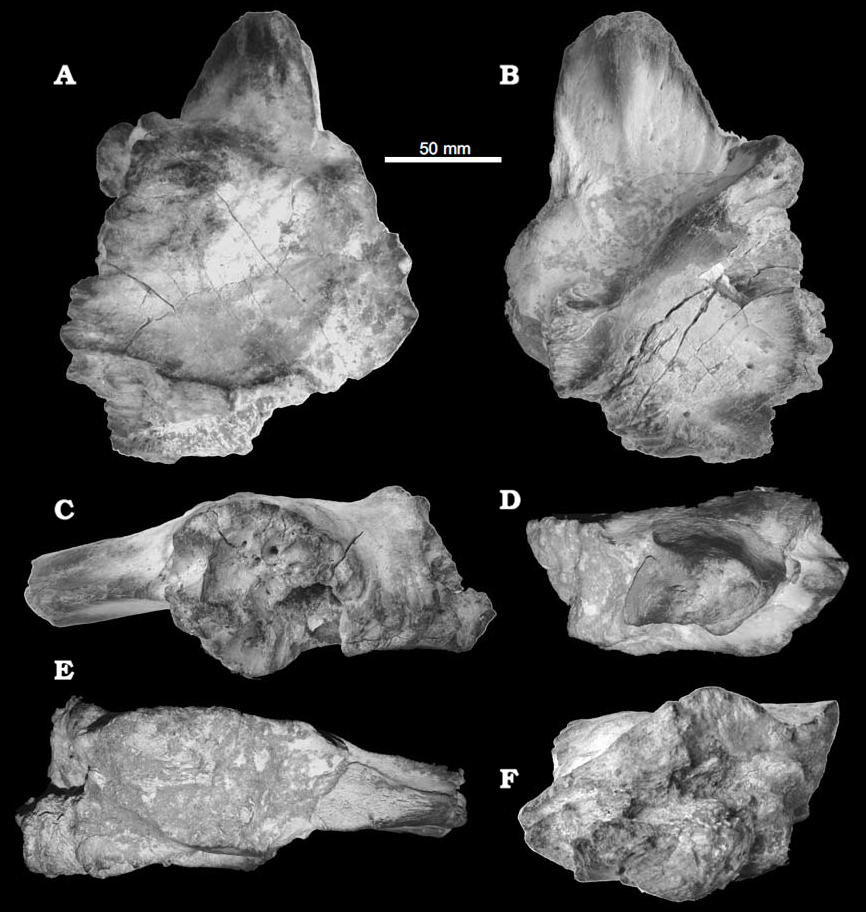
- Holotype specimen, a left frontal bone (MPM 2594)

Scientific classification
- Kingdom: Animalia
- Phylum: Chordata
- Class: Reptilia
- Clade: Dinosauria
- Clade: Saurischia
- Clade: Theropoda
- Family: †Carcharodontosauridae
- Genus: †Sauroniops; Cau et al., 2013

Type species
- †Sauroniops pachytholus Cau et al., 2013

= Sauroniops =

Sauroniops Temporal range: Lower Cenomanian, 100 Ma

Extinct genus of dinosaurs

Sauroniops is a controversial genus of carnivorous carcharodontosaurid theropod dinosaurs known from the Late Cretaceous (Cenomanian stage) of Morocco. It is known from the Gara Sbaa Formation of the Kem Kem beds and contains a single species, S. pachytholus.

== Discovery and naming ==
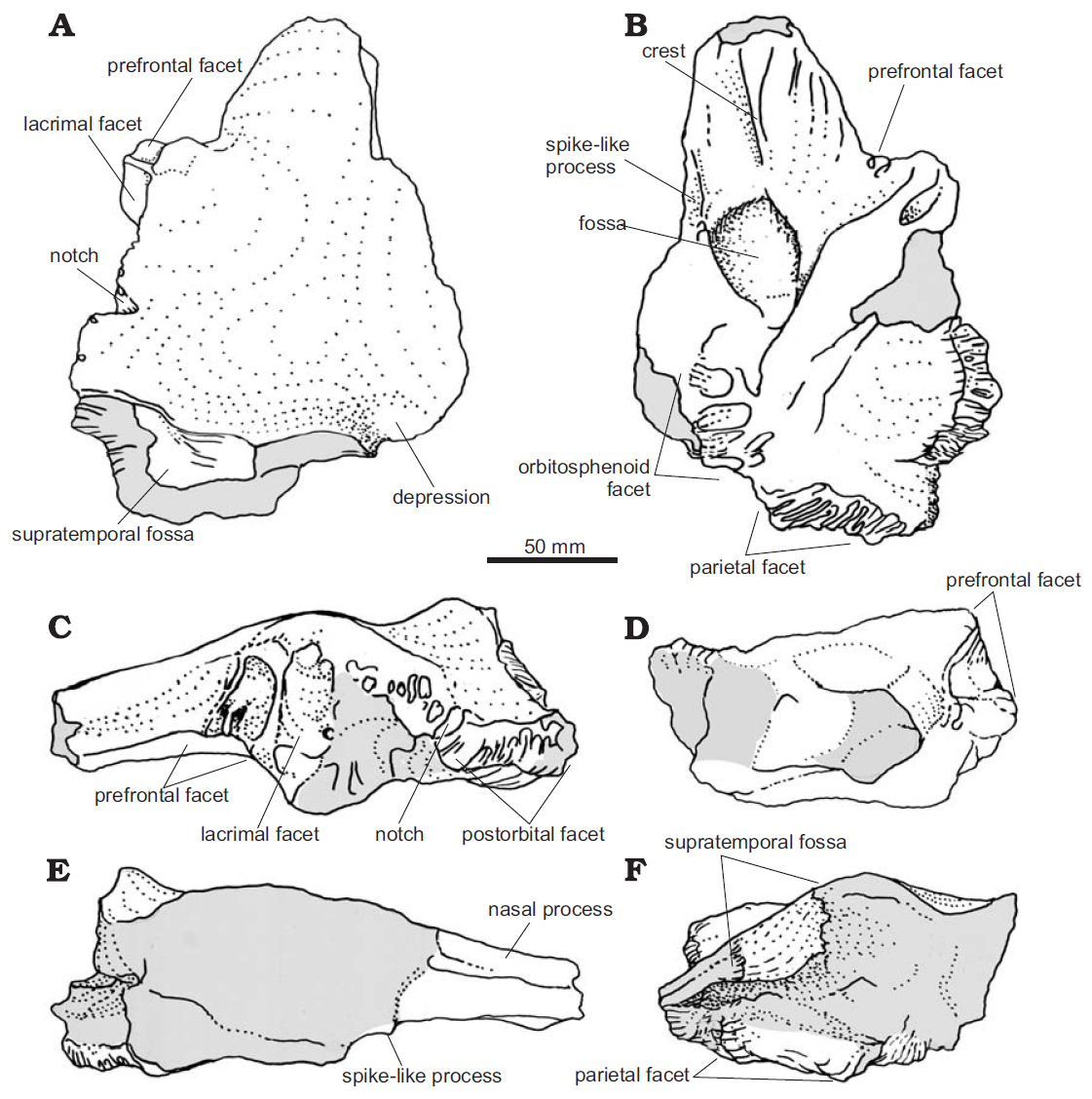
Diagram of the holotype

Fossils of Sauroniops were first discovered by a Moroccan fossil hunter from an unknown locality near the town of Taouz in Errachidia Province, southeastern Morocco. This fossil hunter then sold it to a Moroccan fossil dealer, who then sold it to an individual who donated it to the Italian Museo Paleontologico di Montevarchi in Tuscany in the early twenty-first century. This fossil, consisting of a single, incomplete left frontal (bone above orbit) from a theropod dinosaur. Based on information from the donor, taphonomy of the fossil, and lithology of the matrix around the fossil, it comes from the Gara Sbaa Formation, though it was originally considered to be from the Izefouane Formation, of the Kem Kem Beds. This indicates that the fossil comes from the Cenomanian stage of the Lower Cretaceous.

In 2012, Italian paleontologist Andrea Cau and colleagues described the frontal as belonging to an indeterminate carcharodontosaurid that was distinct from Carcharodontosaurus, another carcharodontosaurid from the Kem Kem Beds. The next year, the same authors, scientifically described the frontal and assigned it to a new genus and species, Sauroniops pachytholus. The generic name Sauroniops is derived from "Sauron", a powerful entity from The Lord of the Rings fantasy novel by J.R.R. Tolkien, with the Classical Greek ὄψ, ops, meaning "eye", referencing the Eye of Sauron. The specific name pachytholus is derived from the Greek παχύς, pachys, meaning "thick", and θόλος, tholos, meaning "dome", in reference to the thick vaulted skull roof unique to this species. This specimen is therefore the holotype (name-bearing) specimen and is deposited at the MPM under catalogue number MPM 2594.

In 2025, Cau and Italian researcher Alessandro Paterna described OPH2211, a pair of fused frontals comparable to the holotype of Sauroniops. However, they noted the less robust morphology of the specimen, which they interpreted as possible intraspecific variation, like in other dinosaurs with thickened skulls. The researchers referred the specimen to cf. Sauroniops sp., refraining from assigning it to S. pachytholus.

=== Disputed validity ===
In 2020, a monograph by Ibrahim and colleagues concluded that Sauroniops is a junior synonym (the same taxon) as Carcharodontosaurus saharicus. This 2020 monograph stated that the holotype frontal of Sauroniops simply comes from an immature C. saharicus and that the diagnostic traits used by Cau and colleagues in their 2013 description are insufficient, found in C. saharicus, or are found in other carcharodontosaurids. Additionally, Ibrahim and colleagues' study opted to assign all carcharodontosaurid fossils from the Kem Kem Beds to C. saharicus. In response, Cau stated in a blog post in 2020 that the arguments made by Ibrahim and colleague's study are misinterpretations of the diagnostic traits of the original 2013 study naming Sauroniops. Several claims, such as that the Sauroniops holotype frontal is only 60% of the size of that of C. saharicus, were stated to be unfounded.

A 2022 study published by Paterna and Cau reevaluated the reasoning of the 2020 study for considering Sauroniops a synonym of Carcharodontosaurus, and found most of the supposed shared features were based on misinterpretations of the Sauroniops holotype. Accordingly, having also found several additional features distinguishing the two taxa, they dismissed the synonymy between Carcharodontosaurus and Sauroniops. In the same study, several skull remains of a carcharodontosaurid distinct from C. saharicus were described, further dismissing the notion that there is only one carcharodontosaurid known from the Kem Kem Beds. In 2025, Kellerman and colleagues in their description of Tameryraptor remarked on the highly fragmentary nature of the Sauroniops holotype, acknowledging the differences between it and Carcharodontosaurus but claiming that taxa should not be named based on such limited material. Pending more material, Kellerman and colleagues considered Sauroniops to be a nomen dubium.

== Description ==
Location of the holotype (blue) in a generalized carcharodontosaurid skull

Sauroniops was a large bipedal predator. In their 2013 description, Cau et al. established several unique traits differentiating Sauroniops from its relatives, such as Carcharodontosaurus which is found in the same layers. The nasal bone has an area of contact with the frontal bone over 40% of the latter's length. The frontal has in the left front corner a thick vaulted area. On the front upper rim the frontal has a trapezoid facet to contact the prefrontal, which is no part of the upper rim of the eye socket, and is separated from the facet for the lacrimal bone by a thin vertical ridge. The contact area with the lacrimal is D-shaped, extremely large and has four times the height of the facet with the postorbital bone. On the rear inner side of the frontal an elevated rim is present that is joint to the front vaulted area by a saddle-shaped depression and more towards the front midline of the skull continues in a series of rugosities.

The frontal has a preserved length of 18.6 centimetres (7.3 in). Near the contact with the lacrimal, the bone is vaulted and extremely thickened to a height of 7.3 centimetres (2.9 in). A second thick area is present at the rear separated from the first by a hollow surface. Such a thickening of the skull roof is more typical of the Abelisauridae. However, in this group it is the postorbital that shows this phenomenon. The similarities to the abelisaurids would then be the result of convergent evolution. The authors explained the thickening as an adaptation for display or to strengthen the skull for intraspecific head-butting.

== Classification ==
The holotype of Sauroniops was originally interpreted as belonging to a basal position in the Carcharodontosauridae, as the sister taxon of Eocarcharia. A 2025 analysis of large Cretaceous theropods from Africa included Sauroniops and a second specimen potentially referrable to this genus as separate operational taxonomic units (OTUs) in a phylogenetic analysis. These results recovered both OTUs in a clade, diverging after the maxilla referred to Eocarcharia (the type specimen of which having been referred to the Spinosauridae), but before Carcharodontosaurus. These results are displayed in the cladogram below:

- Carcharodontosauridae
  - Eocarcharia (referred maxilla)
  - - - Veterupristisaurus
      - Lusovenator
      - Lajasvenator
      - Acrocanthosaurus
    - - - Sauroniops
        - OPH2211 (cf. Sauroniops sp.)
      - - Carcharodontosaurus iguidensis
        - - Shaochilong
          - - Meraxes
            - - - Tameryraptor
                - Carcharodontosaurus saharicus
              - - Tyrannotitan
                - - Mapusaurus
                  - Giganotosaurus

== Paleoenvironment ==
During the Early to Middle Cretaceous, North Africa bordered the Tethys Sea, which transformed the region into a mangrove-dominated coastal environment filled with tidal flats and waterways. The Kem Kem Beds are a sequence of fluvial and lacustrine sediments, though it has some marine sediments. Isotopes from fossils of the dinosaurs Carcharodontosaurus and Spinosaurus suggest that the Kem Kem Beds witnessed a temporary monsoon season rather than constant rainfall, similar to modern conditions present in sub-tropical and tropical environments in Southeast Asia and Sub-Saharan Africa. The Izefouane Formation of the Kem Kem Beds where Sauroniops is known has been interpreted as a braided river system, similar to that found in the Bahariya Formation. This river system was freshwater based on the presence of lungfishes and other freshwater vertebrates. This indicates that the Izefouane Formation had a wide variety of niches, including rivers channels, river banks, sandbars, and more. These riverine deposits bore large fishes, including the sawskate Onchopristis, coelacanth Mawsonia, and bichir Bawitius. This led to an abundance of piscivorous crocodyliformes evolving in response, including the genera Elosuchus, Laganosuchus, and Aegisuchus. Additionally, a leptocleidid plesiosaur has been found in the Kem Kem Beds.

Non-theropod dinosaurs known from the Kem Kem Beds include the sauropod Rebbachisaurus, indeterminate titanosaurian sauropods, an indeterminate ankylosaurian ornithischian, and a possible ornithopod which is known from a footprint. The theropod fauna of the Kem Kem Beds is diverse, including Sauroniops itself, Carcharodontosaurus, distinct indeterminate carcharodontosaurids, Spinosaurus, an indeterminate abelisaurid, an indeterminate noasaurid, and possibly Sigilmassasaurus and Deltadromeus/Bahariasaurus depending on their validities.

The composition of the dinosaur fauna of these sites is an anomaly, as there are fewer herbivorous dinosaur species relative to carnivorous dinosaurs than usual. This indicates that there was niche partitioning between the different theropod clades, with spinosaurids consuming fish while other groups hunted herbivorous dinosaurs. Isotopic evidence supports this, which found greater quantities of sizable, terrestrial animals in the diets of carcharodontosaurids and ceratosaurs from both the Kem Kem Beds and Elrhaz Formation. Carcharodontosaurids are represented by Carcharodontosaurus saharicus and Sauroniops in the Kem Kem Beds, Tameryraptor in the Bahariya Formation, Eocarcharia and potentially Carcharodontosaurus in the Elrhaz Formation, and C. iguidensis in the Echkar Formation.
