= Justin Savornin =

- Born: Célestin Eugène Justin Savornin; 4 December 1876; Pertuis, Vaucluse, France
- Died: 23 February 1970 (aged 93); Algiers, Algeria
- Known for: Research on the Sahara; co-discovery of Carcharodontosaurus
- Scientific career
- Fields: Geology

Célestin Eugène Justin Savornin (4 December 1876 – 23 February 1970) was a French professor and geologist.

== Biography ==
He focused his research on the subsoil of the Sahara and is considered one of its most dedicated explorers.

Savornin, together with Charles Depéret, was one of the principal discoverers in 1924 of the theropod dinosaur Carcharodontosaurus. In their first descriptions of the specimens, they initially assigned the remains to the genus Megalosaurus and later to Dryptosaurus.

He died in Algiers in 1970 at the age of 93. His remains were later repatriated to Pertuis.

== Selected publications ==
- La région d'Oudjda, Protat frères, imprimeurs, 1930
- Notice géologique sur le Sahara central, Imprimeries La Typo-litho et J. Carbonel réunies, 1934
- La géologie algérienne et nord-africaine depuis 1830, Masson, 1931
- Travaux de L'Institut de Recherches Sahariennes, Imprimerie Imbert, Algiers. Volume IV, 1947: Le plus grand appareil hydraulique du Sahara (Nappe artésienne dite de l'Albien), and Volume VI, 1950: Le Bas Sahara (L'appareil artésien le plus simple du Sahara)
