= Bahariasauridae =

Bahariasauridae Temporal range: Early to Late Cretaceous, 106.2–93.5 Ma

Scientific classification
- Kingdom: Animalia
- Phylum: Chordata
- Class: Reptilia
- Clade: Dinosauria
- Clade: Saurischia
- Clade: Theropoda
- Clade: Averostra
- Family: †Bahariasauridae von Huene, 1948

Type genus
- †Bahariasaurus Stromer, 1934

Subclades
- †Aoniraptor?; †Bahariasaurus; †Deltadromeus?; †Gualicho?

Proposed family of theropod dinosaurs

Bahariasauridae is a problematic potential family of theropod dinosaurs that might include a handful of African and South American genera, such as Aoniraptor, Bahariasaurus, Deltadromeus, and Gualicho.

== Classification ==
The placement of the theropods mentioned above is controversial, with some studies placing them as basal ceratosaurs possibly related to Noasauridae, others classifying them as megaraptorans, basal neovenatorids, or basal coelurosaurs.

The family is likely polyphyletic (an unnatural group), with Bahariasaurus in Abelisauroidea, Deltadromeus either as a synonym of Bahariasaurus or as a valid sister taxon to Ornithomimosauria with Gualicho, and Aoniraptor as a likely megaraptorid.
