= Gualichu =

Demon in Mapuche and Tehuelche mythology

Gualichu, or gualicho, in Mapuche mythology and mainly in the Tehuelche culture, was an evil spirit or demon, comparable but not similar to the Devil.

== Description ==
As the Araucanians had not a properly called god of evil, Gualichu was not worshipped but feared. He was blamed for every disease or calamity, and all evil happenings were said to be caused by him. Gualichu could enter people's body or objects and then an exorcism had to be performed to expel him (see also demon possession). He was a purely spiritual being and there is no depiction of him. He was believed to live underground.

By extension, the term applied to an evil spell or charm, or a jinx ("It has Gualichu"). In this sense the word has evolved into gualicho and still survives in the local folklore of Chile, Argentina, south of Brazil and Uruguay, in the form of a noun and a verb (engualichar, to cast an evil spell on somebody or something).

== See also ==
- Wekufe
- Mapuche
- Mapudungun
- Machi (shaman)
- Chilota mythology
- Chilean mythology
- Mapuche International Link
- Chemamull
- Gualicho (dinosaur)
