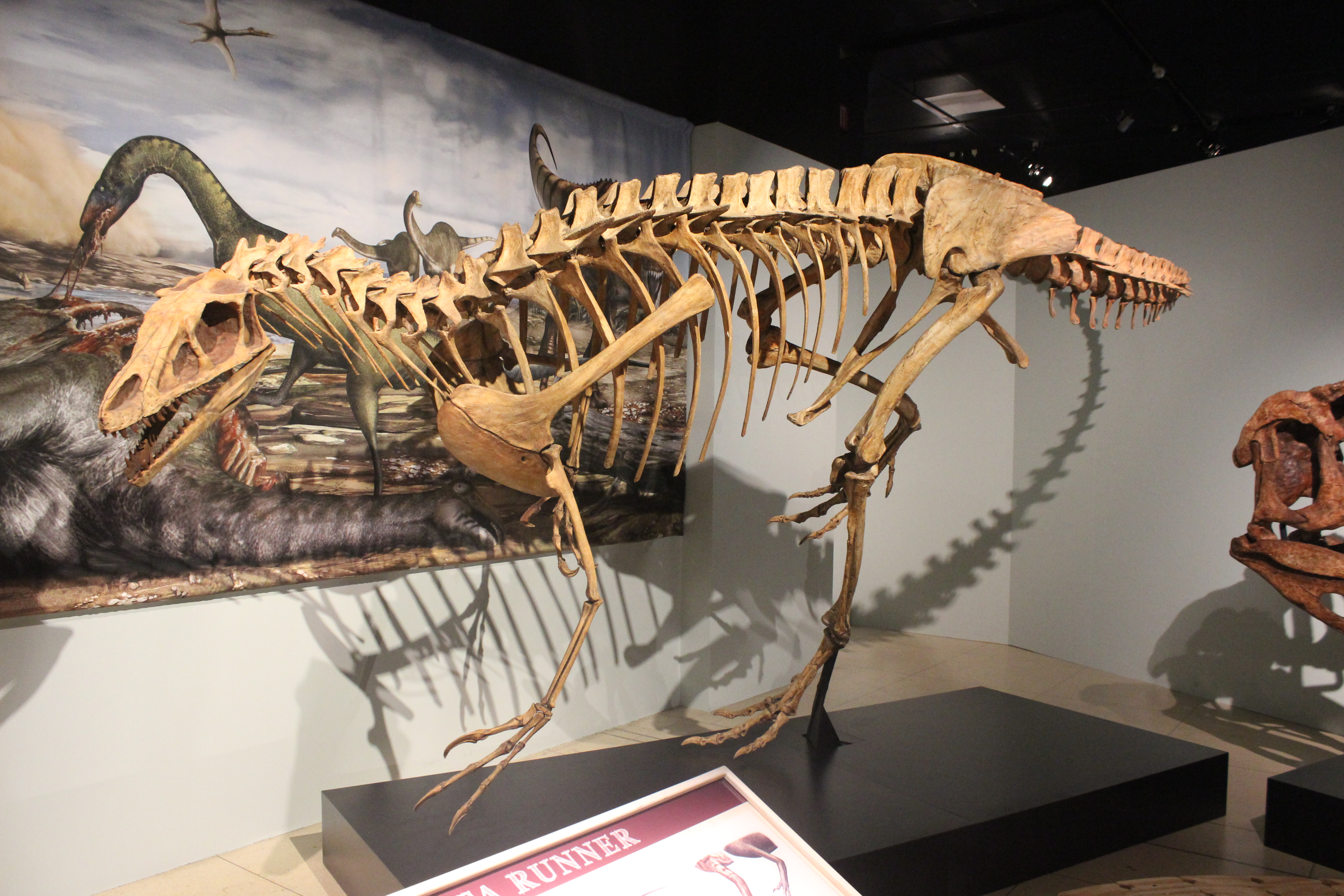
- Mounted skeleton cast with a speculative skull

Scientific classification
- Kingdom: Animalia
- Phylum: Chordata
- Class: Reptilia
- Clade: Dinosauria
- Clade: Saurischia
- Clade: Theropoda
- Superfamily: †Abelisauroidea (?)
- Genus: †Deltadromeus; Sereno et al., 1996
- Species: †D. agilis

Binomial name
- †Deltadromeus agilis Sereno et al., 1996

Synonyms
- Bahariasaurus? Stromer, 1934

= Deltadromeus =

Deltadromeus Temporal range: Late Cretaceous (Cenomanian), 99.6–93.5 Ma

Extinct genus of theropod dinosaurs

Deltadromeus (meaning "river delta or change runner") is an extinct genus of controversial theropod dinosaur that lived in present-day Morocco during the mid-Cretaceous period. It was described by American paleontologist Paul Sereno and colleagues in 1996. The genus contains a single species, D. agilis, named based on an incomplete postcranial skeleton, the holotype specimen. However, some fossils from the Bahariya Formation of Egypt that were formerly referred to the theropod Bahariasaurus have been suggested to belong to Deltadromeus. The holotype specimen of Deltadromeus was unearthed by a joint expedition by the University of Chicago and the Service Géologique du Maroc in Errachidia Province, eastern Morocco in rock layers coming from the Gara Sbaa Formation of the Kem Kem Beds. This indicates that these fossils date to the Cenomanian stage of the Cretaceous period, 100-95 million years ago.

Deltadromeus was around 8 metres (26 ft) in length and 1,050 kilograms (2,310 lb) in weight based on the holotype. If the Egyptian remains do belong to Deltadromeus, this would make it among the longest known theropod genera at around 12.2 metres (40 ft), comparable to Tyrannosaurus. The forelimbs of Deltadromeus are relatively long for a theropod, being proportionately longer than those of taxa like Allosaurus. Deltadromeus also preserves gracile, slender, and relatively long hindlimbs, indicating it was cursorial. Its tail vertebrae have broad, quadrangular neural spines (spines emerging from the base of the vertebra) with pleurocoels (cavities) which would store pneumatic air sacs.

The classification of Deltadromeus has been in flux since its original description. Originally Deltadromeus was considered to be a basal coelurosaur related to Ornitholestes; however, later studies have challenged this idea. Some studies have classified it as an avetheropod closely related to Gualicho or as a megaraptoran outside the family Megaraptoridae. Other studies have proposed that Deltadromeus is a ceratosaur; however, its position within Ceratosauria is debated. Studies have classified it as a basal ceratosaur, noasaurid, or an Elaphrosaurus-grade ceratosaur. Many studies find that it is a ceratosaur of some kind, supported by several phylogenetic analyses. Additionally, some studies have suggested that it may be a junior synonym of Bahariasaurus, another potential ceratosaur which lived around the same time and region as Deltadromeus.

Many gigantic theropods are known from North Africa during this period, including Deltadromeus and Bahariasaurus as well as the spinosaurid Spinosaurus, the carcharodontosaurids Carcharodontosaurus and Tameryraptor, and several unnamed abelisaurids. If Deltadromeus is a ceratosaur closely related to the herbivorous/omnivorous Limusaurus and Berthasaura, it possibly would be herbivorous or omnivorous. This would indicate more niche partitioning in theropods in Cretaceous North Africa and suggest that Deltadromeus filled a role traditionally filled by ornithischians. North Africa at the time was blanketed in mangrove forests and wetlands, creating a hotspot of fish, crocodyliforms, and pterosaur diversity.

== Discovery and naming ==
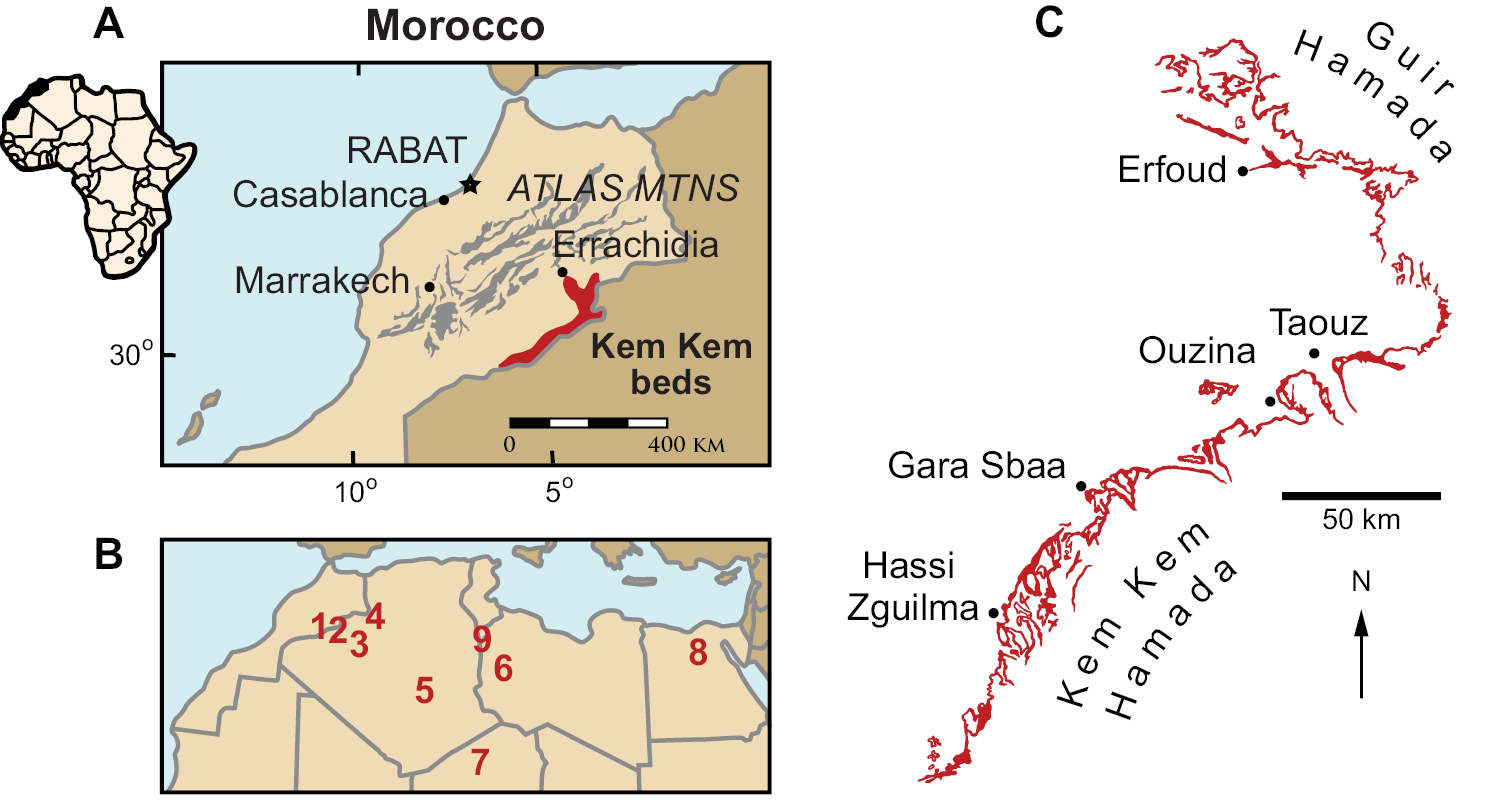
Geographical setting of the Kem Kem region and outcrops

Fossils definitively assigned to Deltadromeus were first discovered in 1996 by American paleontologist Paul Sereno, who was part of a joint expedition by the University of Chicago and the Service Géologique du Maroc in an outcrop of the Kem Kem Beds known as Aferdou N'Chaft in Errachidia Province, eastern Morocco. This expedition was one of many that explored dinosaur-bearing outcrops in North Africa throughout the 1990s and 2000s. The remains found consisted of an incomplete postcranial skeleton, cataloged as UCRC PV11 at the University of Chicago before being transferred to the Ministry of Energy, Mines and Environment in Rabat and catalogued as SGM-Din 2, that had been found in a single site. The strata of this site is made up of sandstones which belong to the Gara Sbaa Formation of the Kem Kem Beds, which dates to the Cenomanian-Albian ages of the middle Cretaceous period.

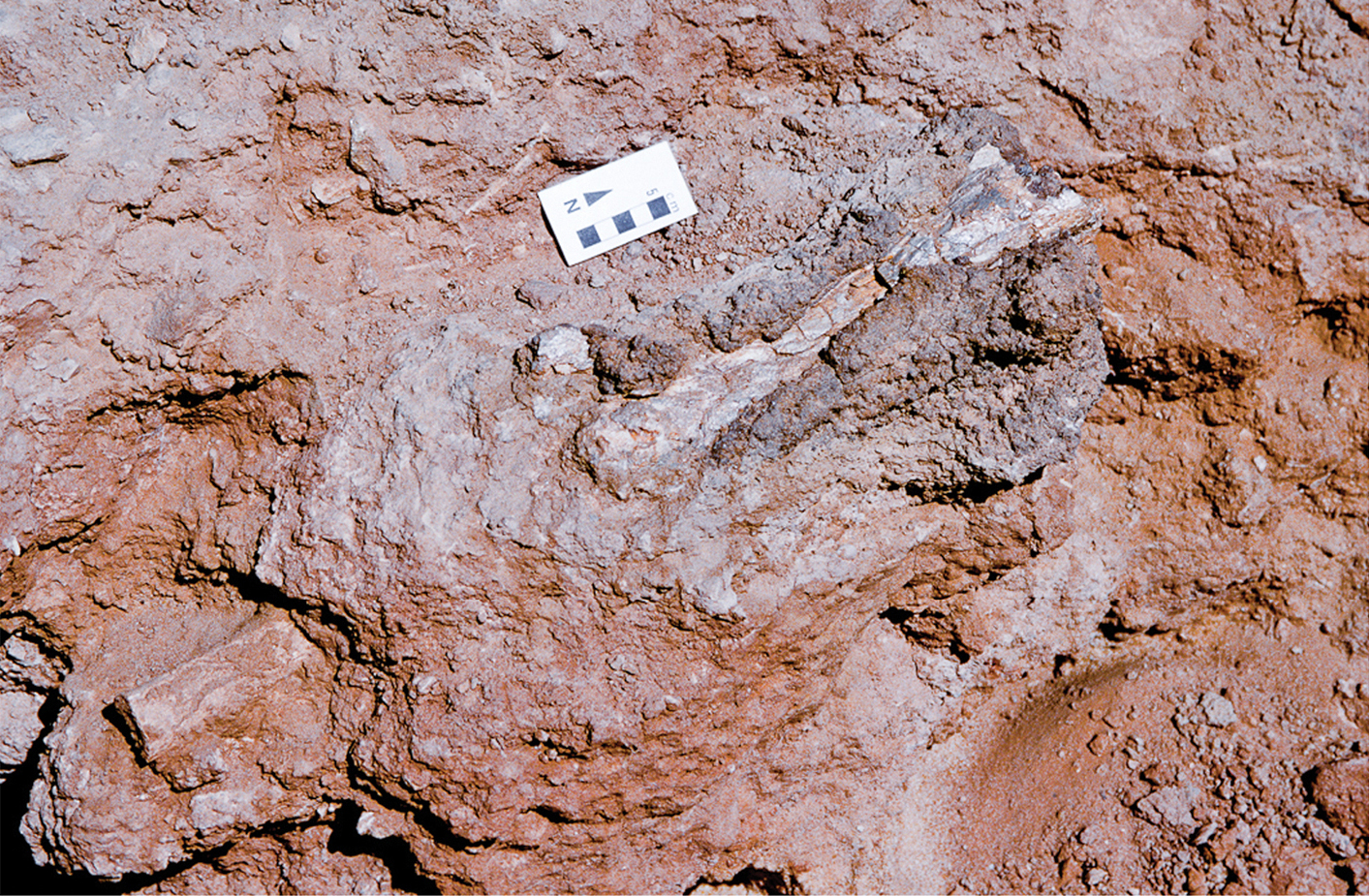
Excavation of the fibula

The skeleton was found preserved in articulation, one of the few articulated dinosaur skeletons known from the Kem Kem Beds, and consists of: two dorsal ribs, two gastralia ("belly ribs"), several caudal (tail) vertebrae, eight chevrons, an incomplete scapulocoracoid, incomplete forelimbs, a partial pelvis, two partial hindlimbs, incomplete pedes (hindfeet), and several additional fragments. Some of these fragments were later identified as being shafts of the humerus and fibula. A bone initially described by Sereno and colleagues as the end of a pubis was later reidentified as the end of an ischium, another pelvic bone, by later studies. This skeleton was likely buried suddenly in a channel deposit based on the coarse-grained matrix surrounding the bones and the discovery of rostral teeth of the sawskate Onchopristis and crocodyliform teeth, two aquatic taxa, near the skeleton. In 1996, Sereno and colleagues scientifically described the remains and assigned them to a new genus and species of theropod, which they named Deltadromeus agilis. The generic name Deltadromeus is a combination of the Greek words delta meaning "change", and dromeus meaning "runner". The specific name is the Greek word agilis meaning "agile". Delta is also a reference to the deltaic facies where the skeleton is found whereas dromeus and agilis refer to the cursorial proportions of Deltadromeus' hindlimbs. The skeleton SGM-Din 2 was selected as the holotype (name-bearing) specimen of Deltadromeus agilis.

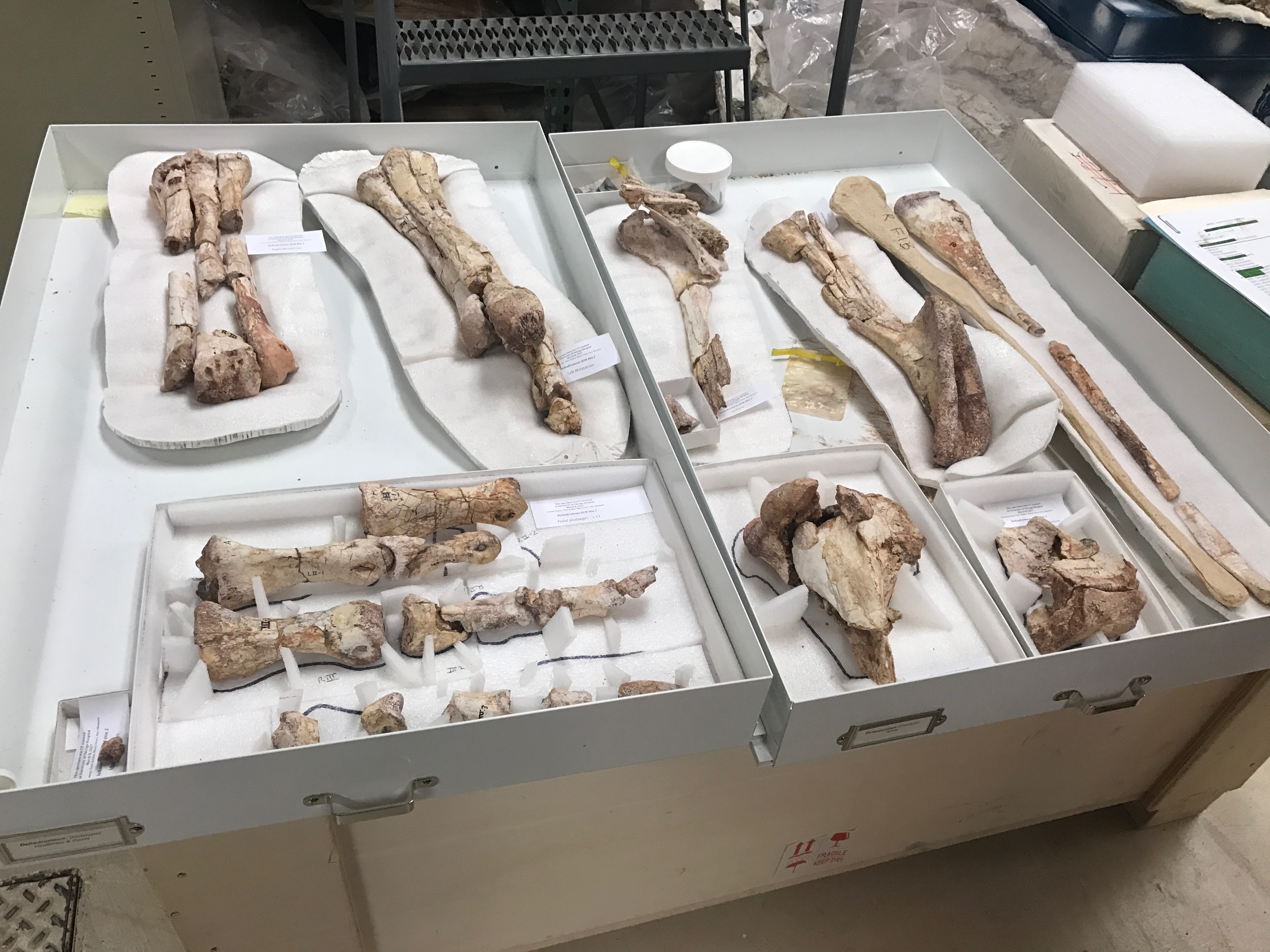
Fossils of the Deltadromeus holotype

Sereno and colleagues also assigned several Egyptian theropod fossils to the species. These fossils, consisting of a left coracoid, pubes, right femur, an incomplete right tibia, and a left fibula, had been unearthed in 1911 and 1912 by Austro-Hungarian paleontologist Richard Markgraf and his crews during German paleontological expeditions to the Cenomanian-aged Bahariya Formation of northern Egypt. These expeditions recovered many theropod fossils, including an individual found in 1922 known from several vertebrae, a rib fragment, and an incomplete pelvis that German paleontologist Ernst Stromer described as belonging to a new genus and species of theropod, Bahariasaurus ingens, in 1934. The proximal right tibia had also been assigned to the allosauroid Erectopus, then identified as belonging to Bahariasaurus by Stromer, and finally Deltadromeus by Sereno and colleagues. All of the fossils described by Stromer, including those referred to both Bahariasaurus and Deltadromeus, were destroyed in the Bombing of Munich during World War II.

Sereno and colleagues maintained that Bahariasaurus and Deltadromeus were different genera, but the validity and synonymy of the two genera is controversial. Several other Kem Kem fossils have been suggested to belong to Deltadromeus, but the holotype is the only specimen that unambiguously belongs to Deltadromeus. In 2015, Canadian paleontologist David Evans and colleagues described a small, nearly complete femur of a theropod that had been found in the Kem Kem Beds. Their description identified the femur as belonging to a noasaurid, but stated it may belong to a juvenile Deltadromeus based on some shared characteristics. In 2024, Belgian paleontologist Christophe Hendrickx and colleagues described several theropod teeth from the Kem Kem Beds, one of which they stated is from either a non-abelisauroid ceratosaur or a megaraptoran, possibly Deltadromeus itself. However, the lack of overlap and the controversy surrounding Deltadromeus affinities made this impossible to prove until more fossils are found.

== Description ==
Size of the holotype compared to a human

The holotype individual was estimated to have measured 8 metres (26 ft) in length and weighed around 1,050 kilograms (2,310 lb), slightly more than an imperial ton,by Australian researcher Frank Seebacher in 2001. Assigned specimens from the Bahariya Formation come from a much larger individual, with the femur IPHG 1912 VIII 69 having a length of 1.22 metres (4 ft), compared to the 0.741-metre-long (2.43 ft) femur of the holotype. These referred specimens, if the referral to Deltadromeus is validated, would indicate that members of the genus could grow up to 12.2 metres (40 ft) in length, approximately the length of a Tyrannosaurus rex. In 2016, American paleontologist Gregory S. Paul gave Deltadromeus/Bahariasaurus a length estimate of 11 metres (36 ft) and a weight estimate of 4 metric tons (3.9 long tons; 4.4 short tons).

=== Anatomy ===
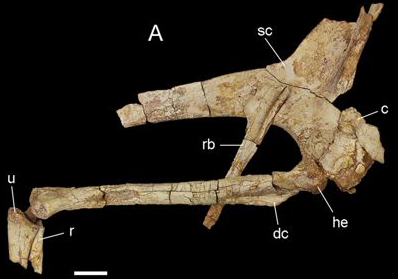
Pectoral girdle and forelimb

Deltadromeus is very poorly known, only being represented by an incomplete postcranial skeleton which is missing much of the vertebrae, ribs, and forelimbs. In addition to its complicated taxonomy, this makes the anatomy of Deltadromeus poorly understood. The limb bones of Deltadromeus are extremely slender, with a length/diameter ratio comparable to that of the cursorial Cretaceous ornithomimosaur Ornithomimus. Additionally, a study of the femur/lower leg ratios of theropods found that the lower leg of Deltadromeus is 7.5% longer than the "average" theropod its size, supporting the conclusion that it was cursorial. These proportions are similar to those of the cursorial deinonychosaurs, compsognathids, tyrannosauroids, and the allosauroid Concavenator. The tibia/femur length/diameter ratio for example is 0.95 in Deltadromeus, whereas it is only 0.76 in Allosaurus and 1.16 in Ornithomimus. This indicates that the hindlimbs are relatively long for a theropod. Additionally, the humerus length/femur length ratio is higher in Deltadromeus than genera like Allosaurus, indicating that the forelimbs are not as reduced in that genus and Tyrannosaurus. The humerus is elongate with a relatively short deltopectoral crest that only spans 1/4 of the total length of the humerus. In contrast to Gualicho, a possible relative of Deltadromeus, the total length of the humerus is less than that of the scapula. The lateral side of the deltopectoral crest is rugose with a transversely curved and concave anterior margin, as in ornithomimosaurs and some ceratosaurs.

The coracoid and acromion processes are broadly expanded anteroposteriorly (front-back), a characteristic believed to be diagnostic of Deltadromeus that also appears in fossils assigned to Bahariasaurus. This acromion process is shallow in Deltadromeus, Gualicho, and some carcharodontosaurids, but is deeper in some other theropods. Additionally, the coracoid has a shallow notch that is also observed in basal ceratosaurs like Limusaurus. The scapulae of Deltadromeus and Gualicho are very similar, with both having relatively short, distally tapering, and narrow scapular blades. This tapering scapula blade is found in taxa like Deltadromeus, Gualicho, Masiakasaurus and Limusaurus, unlike in many tetanurans. The midshaft of the ischium is dorsoventrally (top-bottom) compressed, with triangular obturator flanges on it and the pubis. At the distal end of the ischium, the ischial "foot" is greatly expanded, similar to those of basal abelisauroids but to an extent only seen in an ischium assigned to Bahariasaurus.

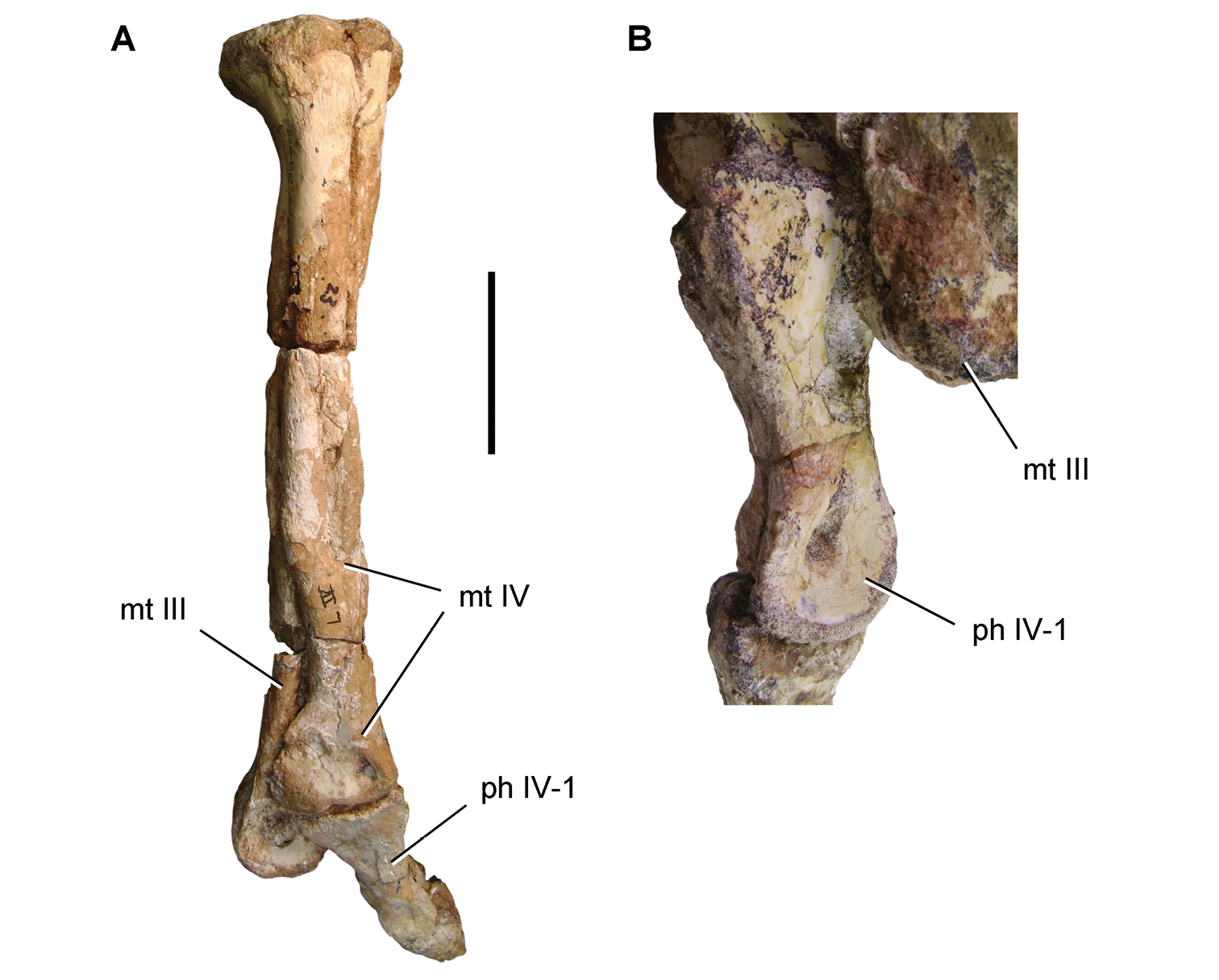
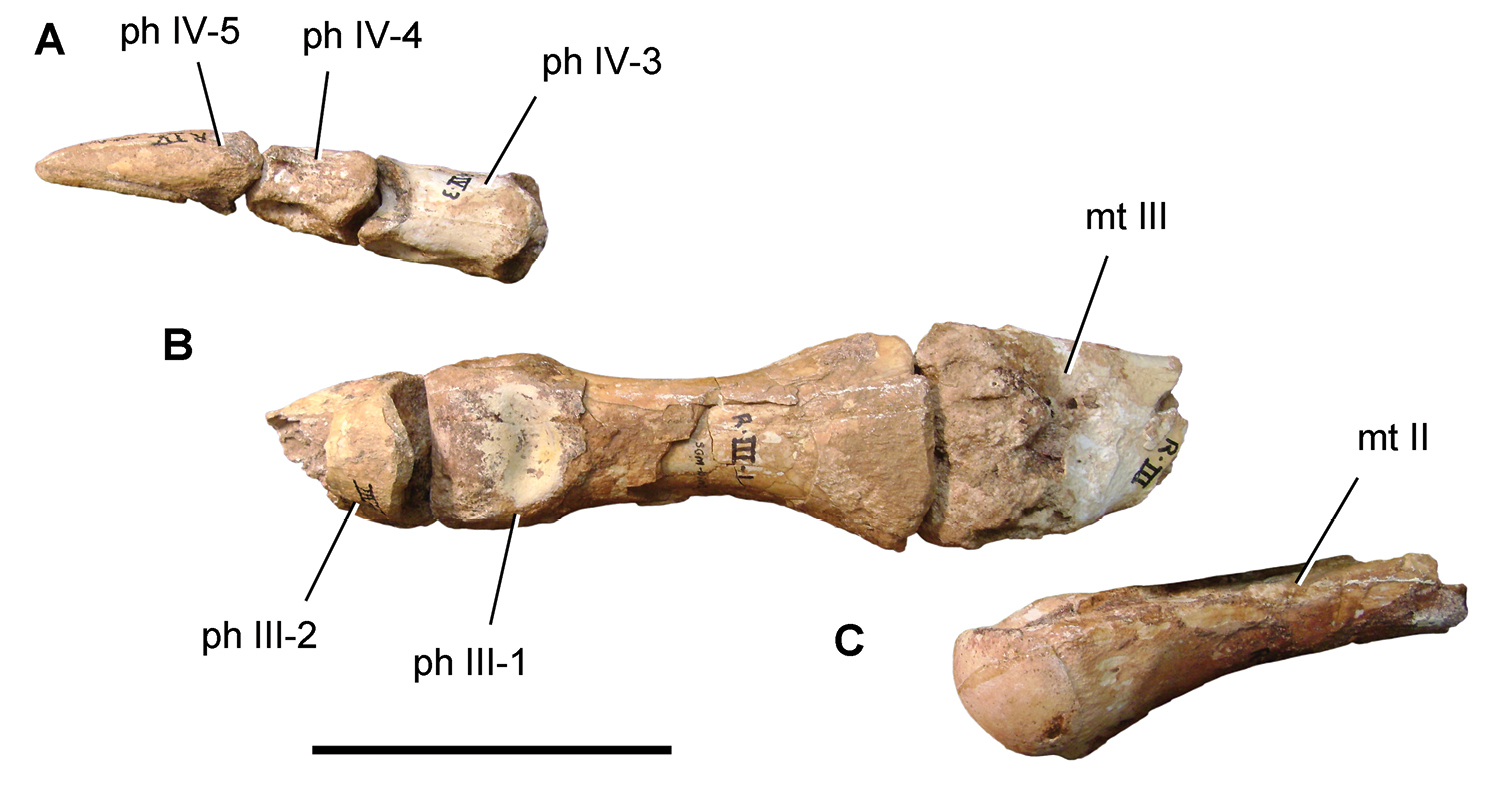
Metatarsals (above) and footbones (below)

The femur's femoral head is elevated dorsomedially, similar to that of an indeterminate Kem Kem noasaurid but different from the femora of Masiakasaurus and most other theropods. Deltadromeus femur is very gracile, with a shaft width/total femoral length ratio of 0.074, similar to that of noasaurids. On the distal (away from body) end of the femur is an accessory trochanter (protrusion of the femur) that is unique to Deltadromeus, though a femur referred to Bahariasaurus has it as well, suggesting that this femur belongs to Deltadromeus. At the distal end of the femur is the medial condyle, which bears a unique extension on its anterior (front) end. The fibula bears a large fossa (depression) at its anterior end, a characteristic found in many ceratosaurs. Unlike its purported relative Gualicho and some other theropods, Deltadromeus' gastralia are unfused to the pubic boot. As in Masiakasaurus, the medial condyles of the metatarsal IV are reduced in Deltadromeus. The anterior caudal vertebrae have broad, elongate, quadrangular neural spines (spines emerging from the base of the vertebra), a trait absent in many other theropods but present in ceratosaurs. These vertebrae also bear pleurocoels, large openings on the lateral sides of the centra that would store air sacs.

== Classification ==
The phylogenetic position of Deltadromeus is complicated by the fragmentary nature of the holotype, the destruction of Bahariasaurus' fossils, and the lack of overlap between fossils found in the Kem Kem Beds and the Deltadromeus holotype. In addition to the mysterious affinities of Deltadromeus, it may be a synonym of Bahariasaurus, another poorly understood dinosaur.

=== Early study ===
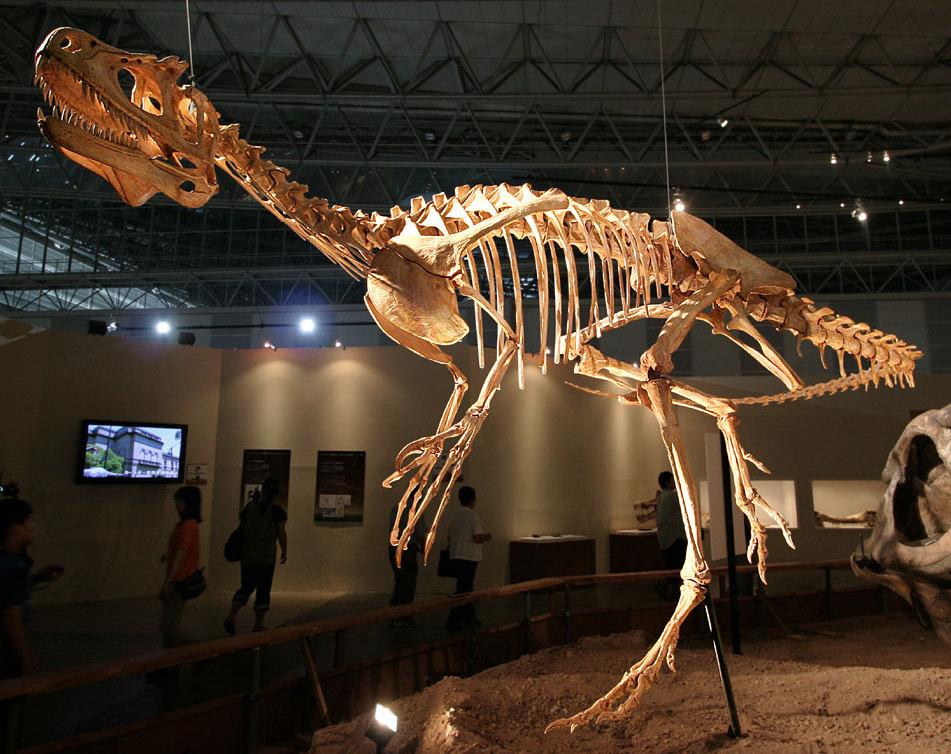
Reconstructed skeleton with earlier version of speculative skull

In 1996, Sereno and colleagues regarded Deltadromeus as a basal coelurosaur, only slightly more derived than the Jurassic genus Ornitholestes, based on Deltadromeus' expanded coracoid, reduced femoral fourth trochanter, and the presence of a deep fossa on the proximal end of the fibula. Based on its position as a basal coelurosaur, this paper hypothesized that coelurosaurs had spread to Africa prior to the end of the Jurassic, giving rise to Deltadromeus and other African coelurosaurs.

Many studies published since the original description of Deltadromeus have considered it to be a ceratosaur, although different studies disagree on what kind of ceratosaur. A 2003 study suggested it was a member of the Noasauridae, though others have found it to be more primitive, possibly related to the more ancestral ceratosaurs Elaphrosaurus and Limusaurus. A more comprehensive study of noasaurid relationships published in 2016 effectively agreed with both of these interpretations, with Deltadromeus, Limusaurus and Elaphrosaurus all found to be within the Noasauridae. A 2017 paper describing ontogenetic changes in Limusaurus and the effect of juvenile taxa on phylogenetic analyses placed Deltadromeus as a noasaurid in every analysis regardless of which Limusaurus specimen was used, although the analyses did not include Gualicho or Aoniraptor. According to the authors, resolving the phylogenetic positions of Gualicho, Aoniraptor, Deltadromeus and megaraptorans is a critical issue facing theropod systematics. Deltadromeus was also considered a noasaurid in a 2020 review of the Kem Kem Group geology and fauna.

In their 2016 description of Gualicho, Apesteguía and colleagues found Gualicho and Deltadromeus to be possible sister taxa in the allosauroid family Neovenatoridae. However, the analysis also noted that Deltadromeus shared many features with ceratosaurs and that if Gualicho was removed from the analysis, Deltadromeus would resolve to a member of Ceratosauria. Since then, some studies find Deltadromeus as a ceratosaur, but did not assess Gualicho. Motta and colleagues (2016) suggested that Aoniraptor, a megaraptoran from Argentina, formed a clade with Deltadromeus and Bahariasaurus ('Bahariasauridae') that was distinct from Megaraptoridae within Megaraptora.

The cladogram below follows the 2016 Gualicho analysis by Sebastián Apesteguía, Nathan D. Smith, Rubén Juarez Valieri and Peter J. Makovicky.

- Allosauroidea
  - Metriacanthosauridae
  - Allosauria
    - Allosauridae
    - Carcharodontosauria
      - Carcharodontosauridae
      - Neovenatoridae
        - - Deltadromeus
          - Gualicho
        - - Neovenator
          - - Chilantaisaurus
            - Megaraptora (?)

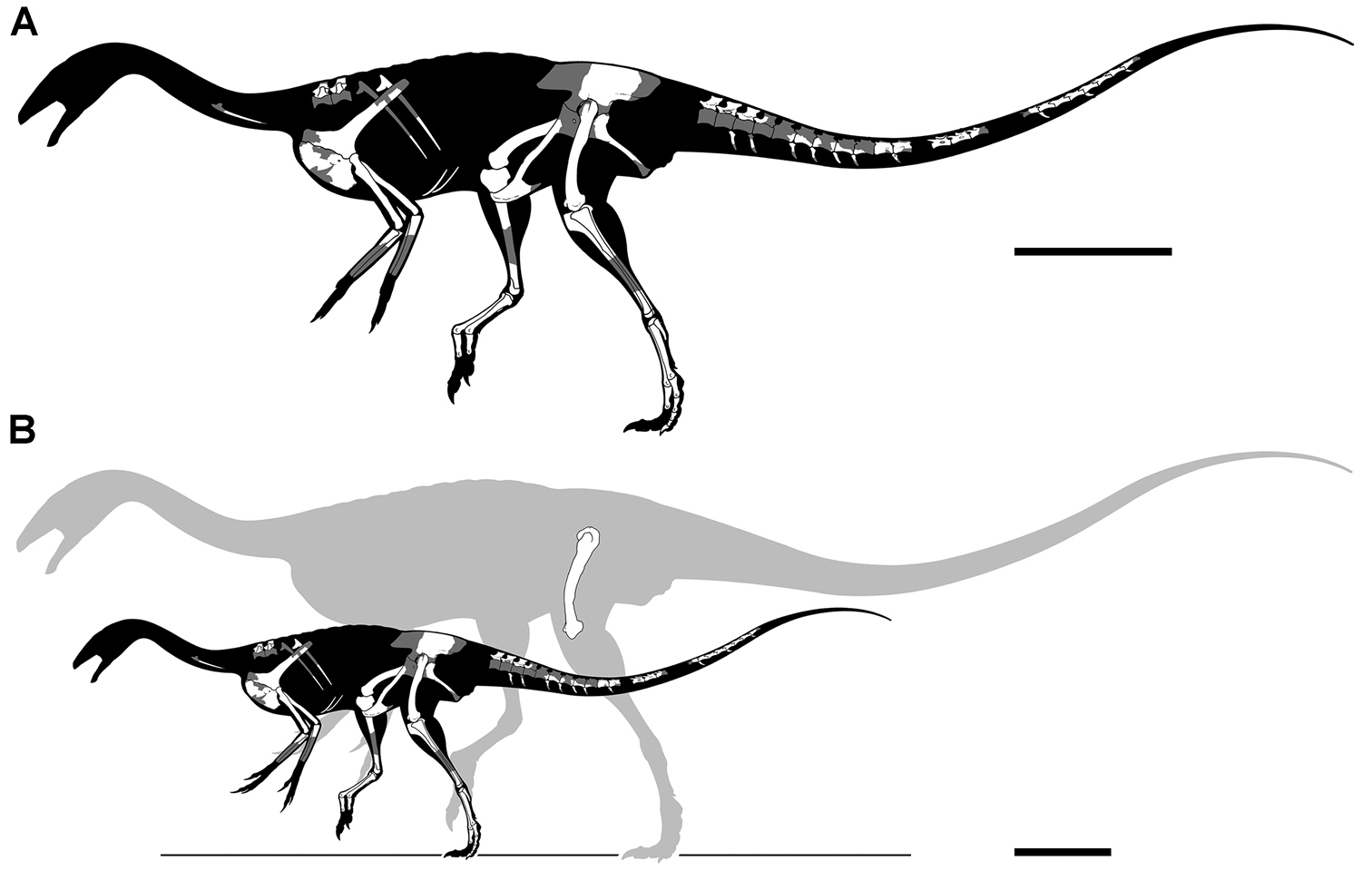
Diagrams showing holotype remains (A) and size of IPHG 1912 VIII 69 (B)

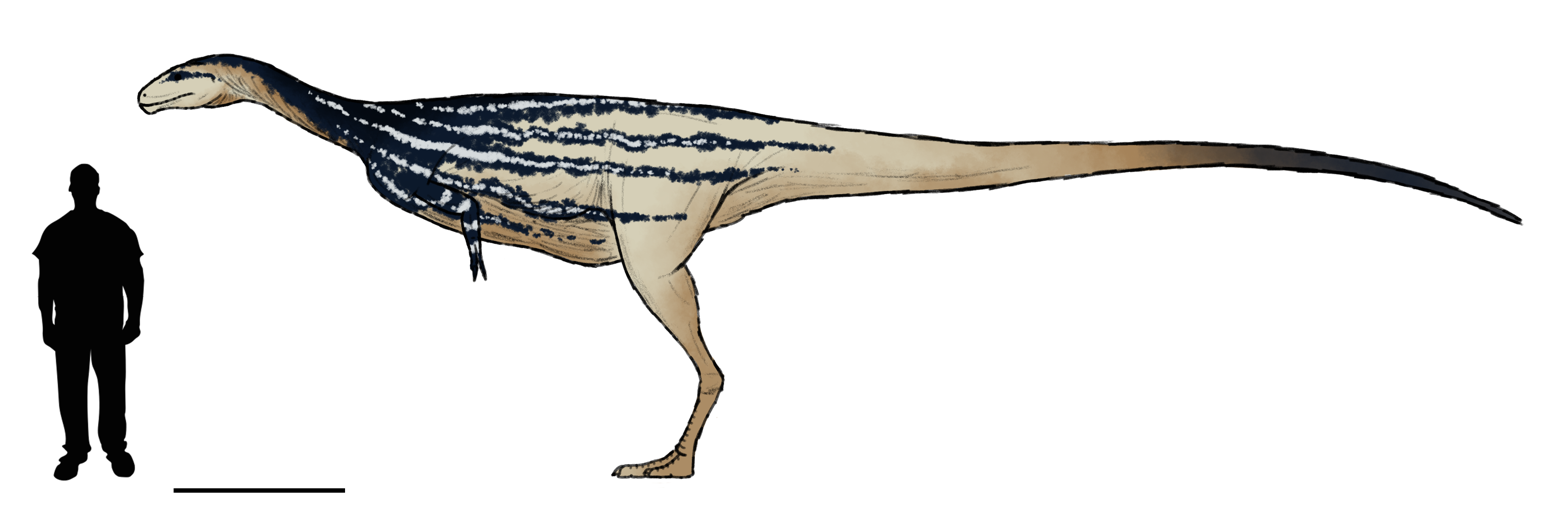
Restoration as a ceratosaur

=== Bahariasaurus and later study ===
The roughly contemporaneous theropod Bahariasaurus, some of the bones of which have been referred to Deltadromeus, has been suggested to be synonymous with the latter taxon. In a 2010 analysis of the Ceratosauria, Carrano and Sampson noted that the differences between Deltadromeus and Bahariasaurus were partily due to misidentified bones in the former, and that other distinctions were subtle and insufficient to distinguish the two. In 2020, Ibrahim and colleagues acknowledged similarities between the two genera, but considered it unlikely that Deltadromeus represents a specimen of Bahariasaurus due to perceived differences in the pelvic bones. They further regarded Bahariasaurus as a nomen dubium.

In 2024, Andrea Cau published a comprehensive theropod phylogenetic framework that could be used to identify immature specimens of other taxa. He included the Bahariasaurus type specimen in his analyses and recovered it within the ceratosaur clade Abelisauroidea in a polytomy including Deltadromeus. The following year, Cau and Paterna used an updated version of this dataset to reanalyze the relationships of Bahariasaurus, Deltadromeus, and other Cretaceous theropods from Africa. They determined that the variation observed between specimens of Deltadromeus and Bahariasaurus was the result of individual and ontogenetic variation, as the former is known from immature remains. They further reidentified specimen SNSB-BSPG1912VIII82—recognized as a indeterminate theropod pubis by Stromer in his 1934 description of Bahariasaurus—as a complete ischium. The authors observed anatomical characters that the bone shares with the less complete ischia of the holotypes of both Bahariasaurus and Deltadromeus, which they used to strengthen their argument. They concluded that Deltadromeus should be regarded as a junior synonym of Bahariasaurus. The results of their phylogenetic analysis are displayed in the cladogram below, with Bahariasaurus (including Deltadromeus) indicated in the so-called "abelisauroid clade 1".

- Abelisauroidea
  - - PRC-NF-1-21 (large Cabao Fm. taxon
    - Kiyacursor
  - - Elaphrosaurus
    - - Berberosaurus
      - - "abelisauroid clade 1"
          - Ligabueino
          - Berthasaura
          - MNN TIG6
          - Angeac-Charente taxon
          - Limusaurus
          - Bahariasaurus (including Deltadromeus)
        - - - Vespersaurus
            - Afromimus
          - - - Velocisaurus
              - Masiakasaurus
            - - Abelisauridae

In a paper analyzing the relationships of Mirischia and Santanaraptor, two coelurosaurs from the Cretaceous of Brazil, Brazilian paleontologist Rafael Delcourt and colleagues found Deltadromeus and Gualicho to be early-branching ornithomimosaurs in their phylogenetic analysis. Delcourt and colleagues (2025) noted that Deltadromeus' femur lacks a crest seen in many other theropods, a condition observed in ornithomimids like Struthiomimus and Gallimimus. Additionally, the medial condyle of the tibia of Deltadromeus bears a large process found in the tibiae of ornithomimosaurs like Mirischia. Although several African theropods from Gondwana have been theorized to be ornithomimosaurs, many of these taxa have since been reclassified as noasaurids, which too have edentulousness, gracile limbs, and elongated cervical (neck) vertebrae like the ornithomimosaurs. However, Delcourt and colleagues as well as a conference abstract recovered Deltadromeus and Gualicho within Ornithomimosauria in their phylogenetic analyses, with the former paper stating that the classification of the two needs further study.

== Paleoenvironment ==
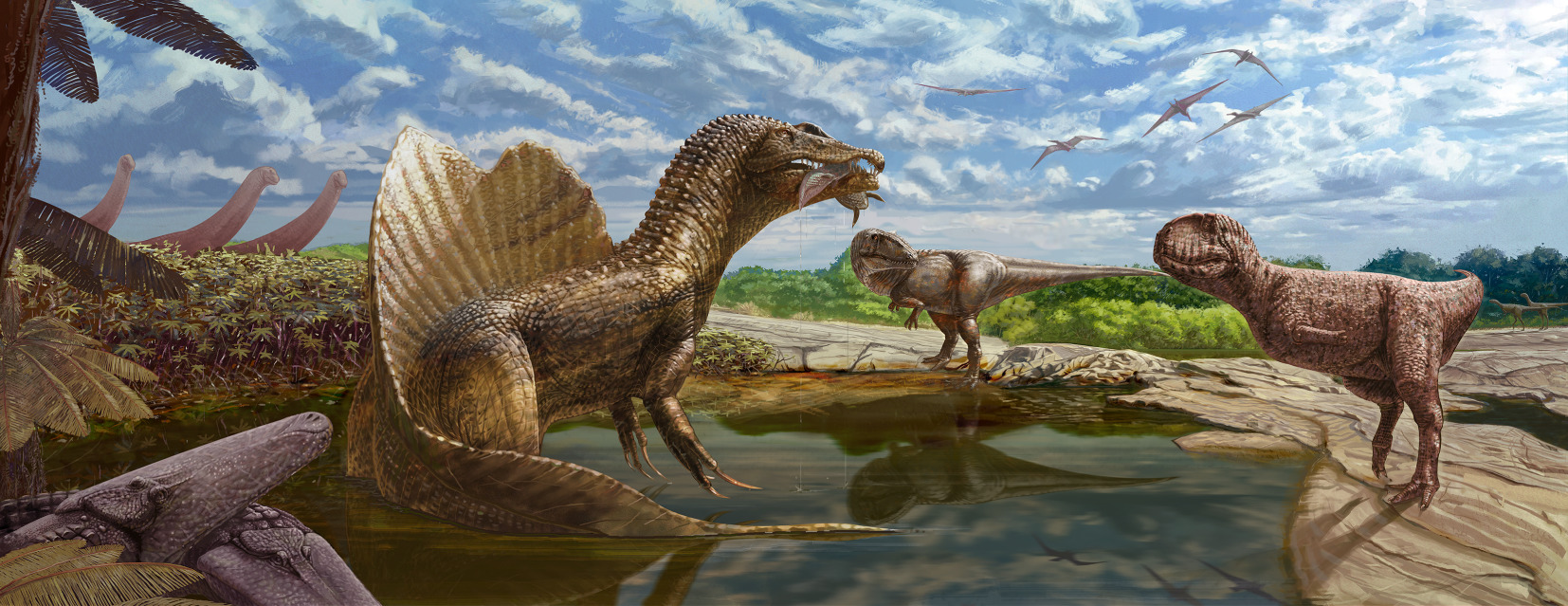
Restoration of the fauna of the Bahariya Formation, with a group of Bahariasaurus in the far right background

Fossils of Deltadromeus are known from the Kem Kem Beds, one of many dinosaur-bearing Cretaceous-aged geologic units in North Africa. Others include the Bahariya Formation of Egypt and the Elrhaz and Echkar Formations of Niger. If the material assigned to Deltadromeus by Sereno and colleagues (1995) is from Deltadromeus, its range would include Bahariya Formation. This would indicate that the distribution of Deltadromeus is similar to that of Spinosaurus. North Africa during this period bordered the Tethys Sea, which transformed the region into a mangrove-dominated coastal environment filled with vast tidal flats and waterways.

The composition of the dinosaur fauna of North Africa at this time is an anomaly, as there are fewer herbivorous dinosaur species relative to carnivorous dinosaur species than in most fossil sites. This abundance of theropods compared to that of non-theropods was dubbed "Stromer's Riddle", which, despite suggestions that this is due to ecological, preservation, or other biases, can be supported by the fossil record. This over prevalence of theropods indicates that there could have been niche partitioning between the different theropod clades, with spinosaurids consuming fish while other groups hunted herbivorous dinosaurs. Isotopic evidence supports this as there were greater quantities of sizable, terrestrial animals in the diets of carcharodontosaurids and ceratosaurs from both the Kem Kem Beds and Elrhaz Formation. North Africa was dominated by a triumvirate of Abelisauroidea, Spinosauridae, and Carcharodontosauridae during the mid-Cretaceous, with all of these groups present in the Kem Kem Beds, Echkar, Elrhaz, and Bahariya Formations.

The abelisauroid affinities of Deltadromeus and Bahariasaurus suggest that they may be omnivorous or herbivorous. This is based on the herbivorous/omnivorous nature of Limusaurus and Berthasaura, which were recovered as a relative of Deltadromeus and Bahariasaurus in phylogenetic analyses. This would indicate niche partitioning in the large theropods in these localities, with Deltadromeus and Bahariasaurus filling a niche typically filled by ornithischians. However, this cannot be confirmed no skull material has been found for either Deltadromeus or Bahariasaurus.

=== Kem Kem Beds ===
The Kem Kem Beds is composed of three geologic formations: the Gara Sbaa Formation, the Douria Formation, and the Izefouane Formation. Isotopes from Carcharodontosaurus and Spinosaurus fossils suggest that the Kem Kem Beds witnessed a temporary monsoon season rather than constant rainfall, similar to modern conditions present in sub-tropical and tropical environments in Southeast Asia and Sub-Saharan Africa. This river system was freshwater based on the presence of lungfishes and other typically freshwater vertebrates. This indicates that the Kem Kem Beds had a wide variety of features, including river channels, river banks and sandbars. Fossils of giant fishes have been found in the Kem Kem Beds, including the sawskate Onchopristis, coelacanth Axelrodichthys, and bichir Bawitius. The Kem Kem Beds also preserves an abundance of crocodyliformes like the stomatosuchid Laganosuchus, the peirosaurid Hamadasuchus, and the pholidosaurid Elosuchus. This region also bore an abundance of pterosaurs like the toothed anhanguerids Siroccopteryx and Nicorhynchus and the edentulous azhdarchoids Alanqa and Leptostomia.

The Kem Kem Beds preserve many dinosaur fossils. Sauropod dinosaurs are known by the rebbachisaurid sauropod Rebbachisaurus, an indeterminate somphospondylian titanosauriform, and an indeterminate titanosaur, one comparable in size to the giant Paralititan. Ornithischian fossils are extremely rare, only being represented from an isolated thyreophoran tooth and footprints of an ornithopod, possibly similar to Iguanodon. As for theropods, many are known, including one or two distinct indeterminate abelisaurids, the carcharodontosaurids Carcharodontosaurus and Sauroniops, indeterminate noasaurids, and the spinosaurids Spinosaurus and Sigilmassasaurus, if it is distinct. However, many of these dinosaurs are known from isolated or incomplete remains, have complicated taxonomies, or are under study.
