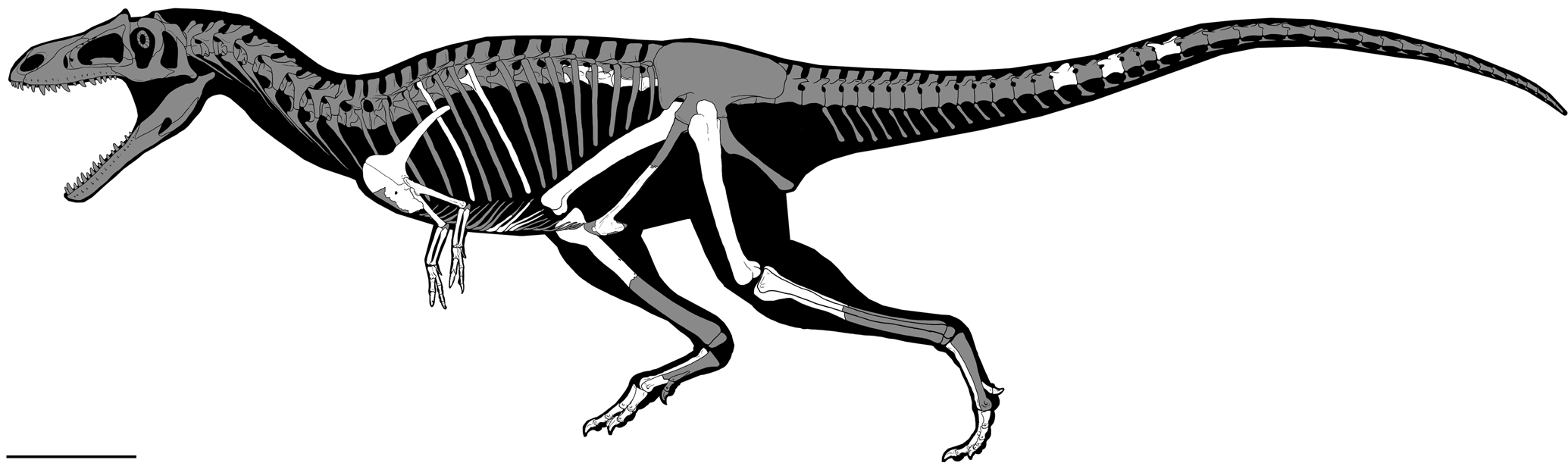
- Speculative skeletal reconstruction, with known elements in white

Scientific classification
- Kingdom: Animalia
- Phylum: Chordata
- Class: Reptilia
- Clade: Dinosauria
- Clade: Saurischia
- Clade: Theropoda
- Clade: Averostriformes
- Clade: Averostra
- Genus: †Gualicho; Apesteguía et al., 2016

Type species
- †Gualicho shinyae Apesteguía et al., 2016

Synonyms
- "Nototyrannus violantei" Anonymous, 2011 (nomen nudum)

= Gualicho =

Gualicho Temporal range: Early Cretaceous (Albian), 106.2 Ma

Genus of theropod dinosaur from the Late Cretaceous period

Gualicho (named in reference to the gualichu) is an enigmatic genus of theropod dinosaurs. The type species is Gualicho shinyae. It lived in what is now northern Patagonia, on what was then a South American island continent split off from the supercontinent Gondwana. The fossils were found in the Huincul Formation, dating to the Albian stage of the lower Cretaceous Period, around 106 million years ago.

== Discovery ==
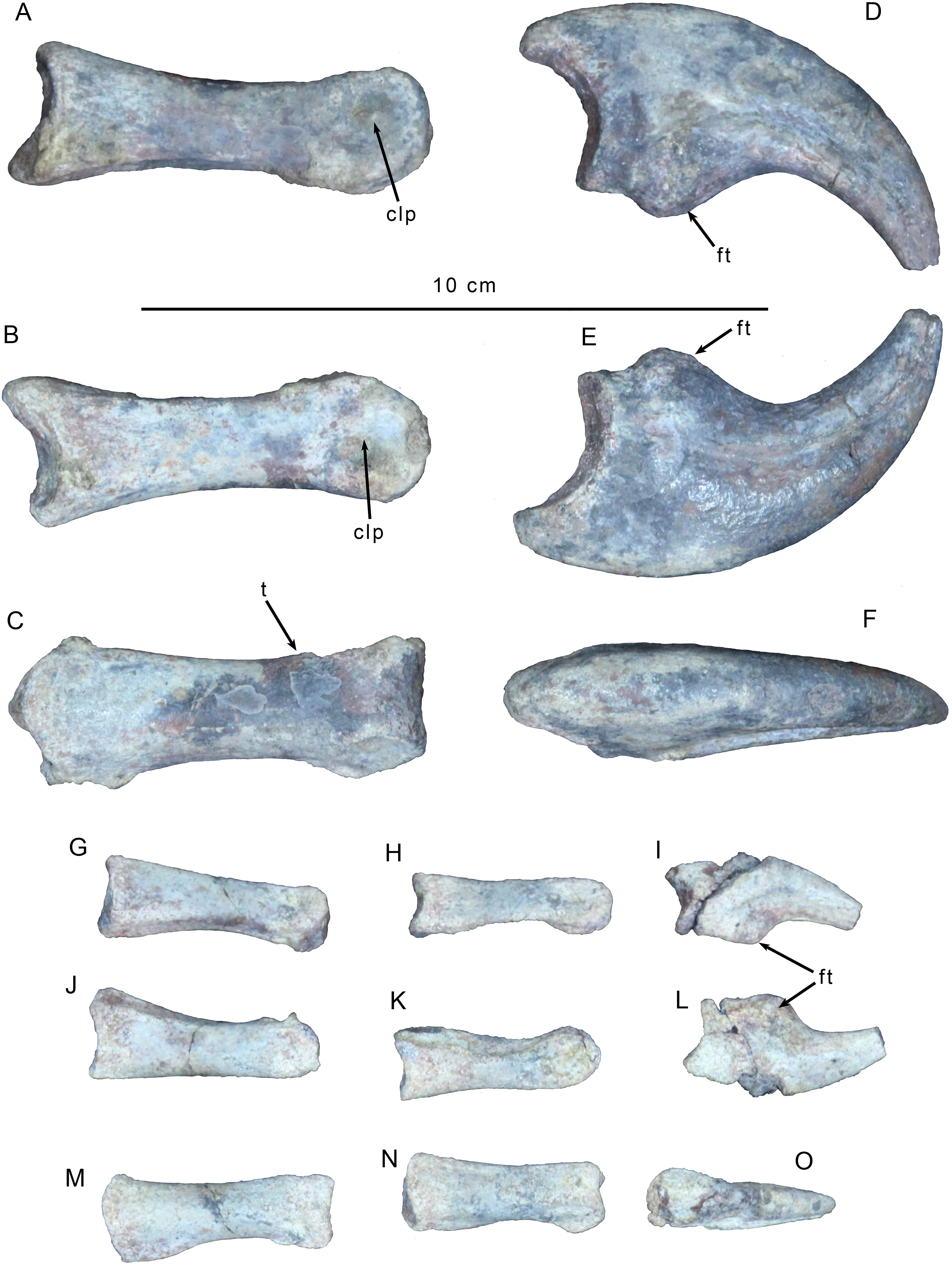
Digits of the left hand

On 13 February 2007, Akiko Shinya, preparator of the Field Museum of Natural History, east of the Ezequiel Ramos Mexía Reservoir at the Rancho Violante, discovered the skeleton of a theropod new to science. In 2016, the specimen was named and described by Sebastián Apesteguía, Nathan D. Smith, Rubén Juárez Valieri and Peter J. Makovicky. The generic name is derived from the gualichu, a demon of local folklore. The specific name honours Shinya as the animal's discoverer.

The holotype, MPCN PV 0001, consists of a partial skeleton lacking the skull. It contains four vertebrae of the back, three vertebrae of the middle tail, ribs, a basket of belly-ribs, the left shoulder girdle, the left forelimb, the right lower arm, the lower ends of both pubic bones, the right thighbone, the lower end of the left thighbone, the upper ends of the right shinbone and calf bone, elements of both metatarsi and three toes of the right foot. Most bones were uncovered in their original anatomical position but much of the skeleton had been destroyed by erosion.

Gualicho has been informally suggested on blogs to be synonymous with the megaraptoran Aoniraptor, also known from Huincul Formation and uncovered at the Violante site in view of similarities in their caudal vertebrae. If this were supported, the name Gualicho would have precedent. Aranciaga Rolando et al. in 2020 performed a comparative analysis between the pneumatic structures of Aoniraptor and Gualicho, and found many differences between the two.

== Description ==
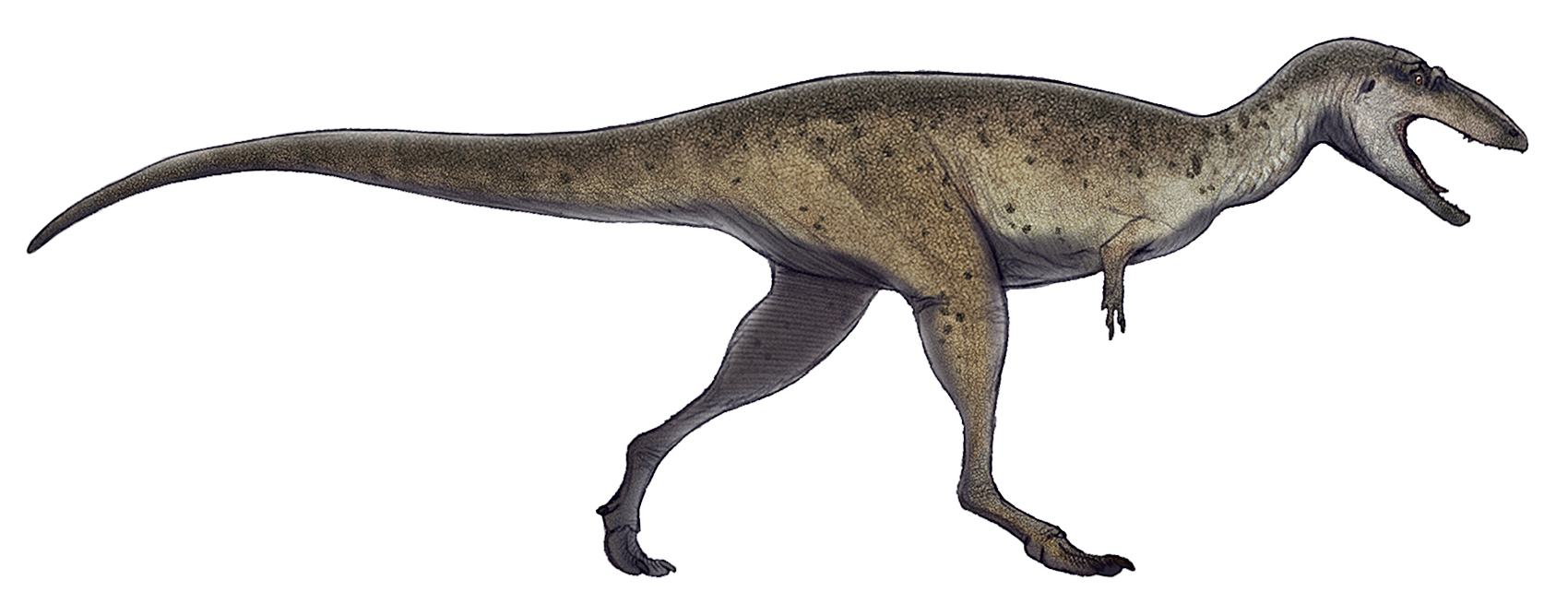
Speculative life restoration

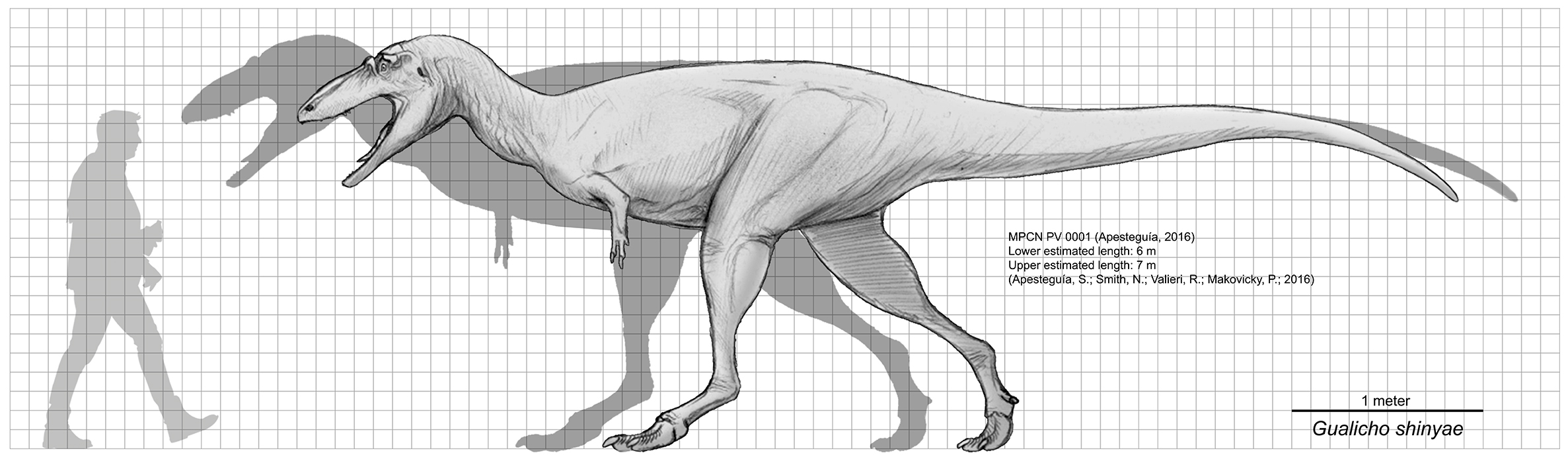
Estimated size compared to a human

Like the well-known Tyrannosaurus, to which it has been compared, the 6–7 m (20–23 ft) Gualicho possesses reduced arms and possibly two fingered hands, although a 2020 study suggests enough of the third metacarpal is present for a third finger. If it is an allosauroid, this finding indicates that carnosaurs may have been subject to the same evolution of limb-reduction as tyrannosaurids and abelisaurids.

== Classification ==
Gualicho has been interpreted as presenting two evolutionary scenarios: that megaraptorans and neovenatorids were allosauroids, or that megaraptorans and neovenatorids were a grade of theropods more closely related to coelurosaurs than to carnosaurs. The cladogram below follows a 2016 analysis by Apesteguía et al., with Gualicho within Carcharodontosauria:

- Allosauroidea
  - Metriacanthosauridae
  - Allosauria
    - Allosauridae
    - Carcharodontosauria
      - Carcharodontosauridae
      - Neovenatoridae
        - - Deltadromeus
          - Gualicho
        - - Neovenator
          - - Chilantaisaurus
            - Megaraptora

The cladogram below follows the strict consensus (average result) of the twelve most parsimonious trees (the simplest evolutionary paths, in terms of the total amount of sampled features evolved or lost between sampled taxa) found by Porfiri et al. (2018)'s phylogenetic analysis. Although the results are different, with Gualicho within Coelurosauria, the methodology analysis was practically identical to that of Apesteguia et al. (2016), only differing in the fact that it incorporated Tratayenia and Murusraptor, two megaraptorans not sampled in the analysis of Apesteguia et al.

- Avetheropoda
  - Eocarcharia
  - Neovenator
  - Concavenator
  - Acrocanthosaurus
  - Allosaurus
  - - Sinraptor
    - Monolophosaurus
  - - Shaochilong
    - - Carcharodontosaurus
      - - Tyrannotitan
        - - Mapusaurus
          - Giganotosaurus
  - Coelurosauria
    - Gualicho
    - Chilantaisaurus
    - Megaraptora
      - Fukuiraptor
      - Megaraptoridae
        - Murusraptor
        - Tratayenia
        - Megaraptor
        - Aerosteon
        - Australovenator
        - Orkoraptor
    - Tyrannoraptora

In 2025, Calvo and colleagues compared the humerus of Gualicho to that of other megaraptorans including a specimen of adult Megaraptor, and concluded that this taxon is not closely related to them due to significant morphological differences. They also noted that the features of its humerus shares many similarities to various groups of coelurosaurs, so a confident referral within a specific clade of theropods cannot be made. In their comprehensive revision of Santanaraptor and Mirischia, Delcourt et al. (2025) recovered Deltadromeus and Gualicho as sister taxa within Ornithomimosauria based on both equal and implied weight phylogenetic analyses.

== See also ==
- 2016 in paleontology
