= Chemamüll =

Mapuche grave statues

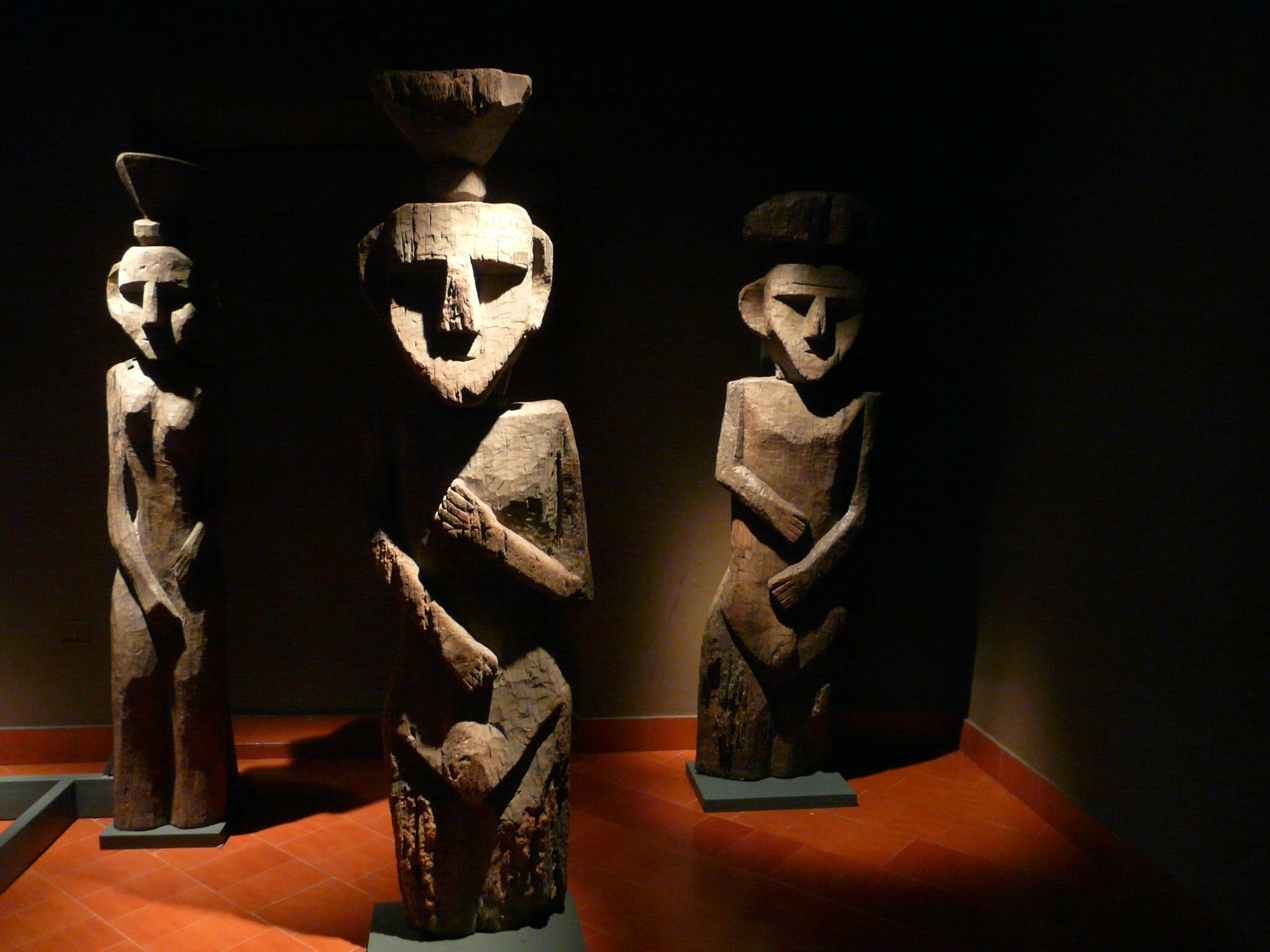
Wooden statues or chemamüll

Chemamüll ('wooden person', from Mapuche che 'people' and mamüll 'wood') are Mapuche statues made of wood used to signal the grave of a deceased person.

== Description ==
Proportion of a chemamüll, Mapuche funeral statue, over a person.

The chemamüll are carved wooden statues, usually more than 2 metres (6 ft 7 in) tall, that represent the stylized body and head of a human being. Statues may have male or female features. The Mapuche used whole logs of either Nothofagus obliqua, a hardwood, or laurel for their chemamüll.

The Mapuche made chemamüll in pre-Columbian times in a manner similar to headstones. According to testimony in books, chemamüll helped the deceased's soul reunite with its ancestors. This sculpture stood by the deceased during the funeral and was then erected over the grave.
