= Cienciargentina =

Cienciargentina Temporal range: Early Cretaceous (Albian), 106.2 Ma

Scientific classification
- Kingdom: Animalia
- Phylum: Chordata
- Class: Reptilia
- Clade: Dinosauria
- Clade: Saurischia
- Clade: †Sauropodomorpha
- Clade: †Sauropoda
- Superfamily: †Diplodocoidea
- Family: †Rebbachisauridae
- Genus: †Cienciargentina; Simón & Salgado, 2025
- Species: †C. sanchezi

Binomial name
- †Cienciargentina sanchezi Simón & Salgado, 2025

Genus of rebbachisaurid dinosaurs

Cienciargentina is a genus of rebbachisaurid sauropod from the Early Cretaceous (Albian) Huincul Formation of Argentina. The genus contains a single species, Cienciargentina sanchezi, known from three partial skeletons of different sizes. Cienciargentina is the fourth definitive rebbachisaurid to be named from the Huincul Formation.

== Discovery and naming ==
Three Cienciargentina specimens have been identified based on differences in size, despite their disarticulation and association. The holotype specimen, MMCH-Pv 45, comprises three cervical vertebrae, four dorsal vertebrae, two ribs, seventeen caudal vertebrae, four haemal arches, a scapula and sternal plate, an ischium, and both femora, tibiae, and fibulae. Two paratypes include the smaller MMCH-PV 54 (a right ischium and tibia) and the larger MMCH-PV 55 (two ribs and a fibula). They were found in the La Antena locality of the Huincul Formation in Villa El Chocón, Neuquén Province, Argentina.

In 2025, Simón & Salgado described the remains as a new genus and species of rebbachisaurid. The generic name, Cienciargentina, honors the scientific and technological system of Argentina that contributes to the development of the country. The specific name, sanchezi, honors Teresa Sánchez for her work on Argentinian paleontology.

== Classification ==
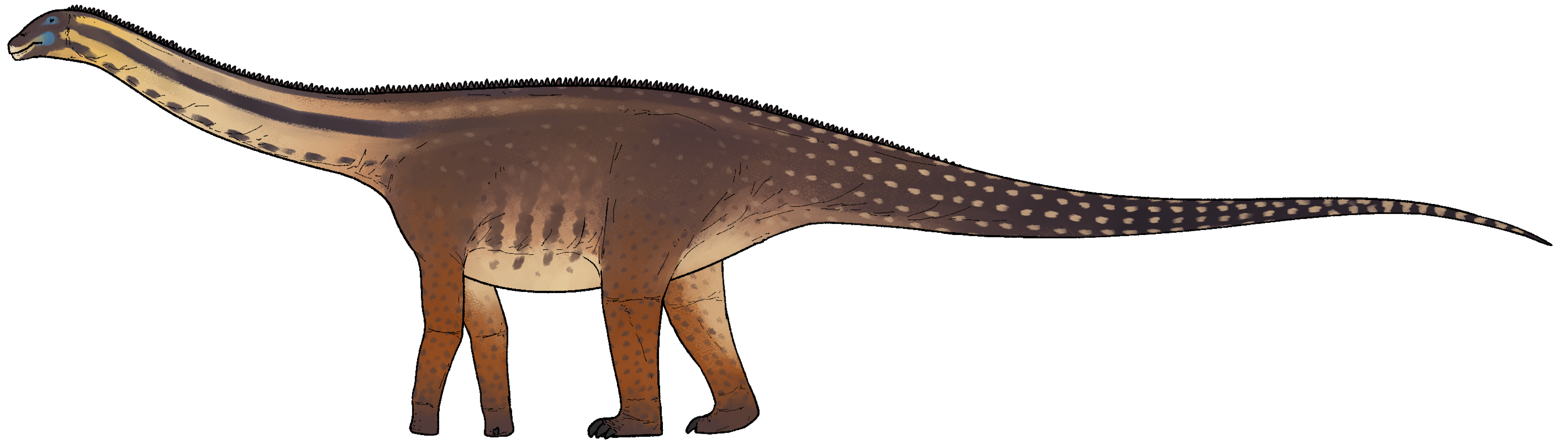
Speculative life restoration

In their 2025 description of Cienciargentina, Simón & Salgado recovered it as the basalmost member of the diplodocoid family Rebbachisauridae. These results are displayed in the cladogram below:

- Diplodocoidea
  - Flagellicaudata
  - Rebbachisauridae
    - Cienciargentina
    - - Amazonsaurus
      - - Agustinia
        - Histriasaurus
        - - - Zapalasaurus
            - - Sidersaura
              - Itapeuasaurus
          - - Comahuesaurus
            - - - Cathartesaura
                - Lavocatisaurus
              - Khebbashia
                - Limaysaurus
                - - Katepensaurus
                  - - Rebbachisaurus
                    - - Nigersaurus
                      - - Demandasaurus
                        - Tataouinea

== Paleoenvironment ==
Size of several dinosaurs from the Huincul Formation compared to a human (Cienciargentina not shown)

Cienciargentina is known from the Early Cretaceous Huincul Formation of Río Negro Province, Argentina. The three specimens of Cienciargentina were found in association with the remains of the titanosaur Choconsaurus. Multiple other rebbachisaurids (Astigmasaura, Cathartesaura, Sidersaura, and remains historically referred to Limaysaurus) are also known from this formation, implying high faunal turnover for the group.

Many other dinosaurs, including titanosaurs (Argentinosaurus, Bustingorrytitan, and Chucarosaurus), carcharodontosaurids (Mapusaurus, Meraxes, and Taurovenator), a megaraptoran (Aoniraptor), abelisaurids (Skorpiovenator, Tralkasaurus, and Ilokelesia), an elaphrosaurine (Huinculsaurus), a paravian (Overoraptor), and the unusual avetheropod Gualicho have also been named from the formation. Remains of unenlagiids, iguanodonts, and elasmarian ornithopods are also known.
