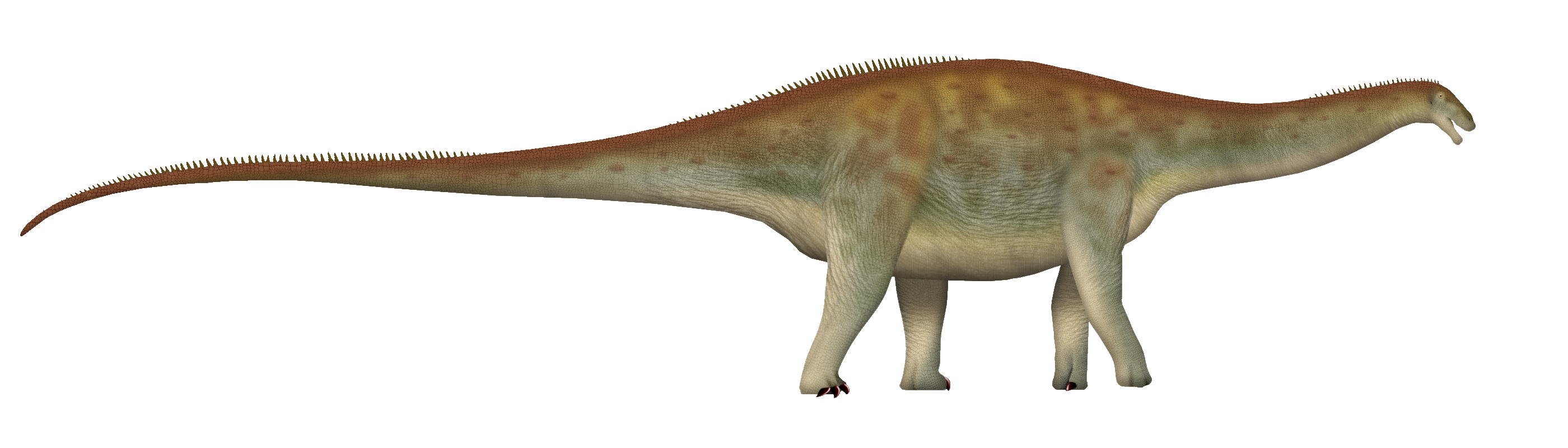
- Life reconstruction

Scientific classification
- Kingdom: Animalia
- Phylum: Chordata
- Class: Reptilia
- Clade: Dinosauria
- Clade: Saurischia
- Clade: †Sauropodomorpha
- Clade: †Sauropoda
- Clade: †Eusauropoda
- Superfamily: †Diplodocoidea
- Family: †Rebbachisauridae
- Genus: †Sidersaura; Lerzo et al., 2024
- Species: †S. marae

Binomial name
- †Sidersaura marae Lerzo et al., 2024

= Sidersaura =

Sidersaura Temporal range: Early Cretaceous (Albian), 106.2 Ma

Genus of rebbachisaurid dinosaurs

Sidersaura (meaning "star lizard") is an extinct monotypic genus of rebbachisaurid sauropod dinosaur from the Early Cretaceous Huincul Formation of Argentina. The genus contains a single species, S. marae, known from the remains of four individuals. Sidersaura represents one of the largest known rebbachisaurids.

== Discovery and naming ==
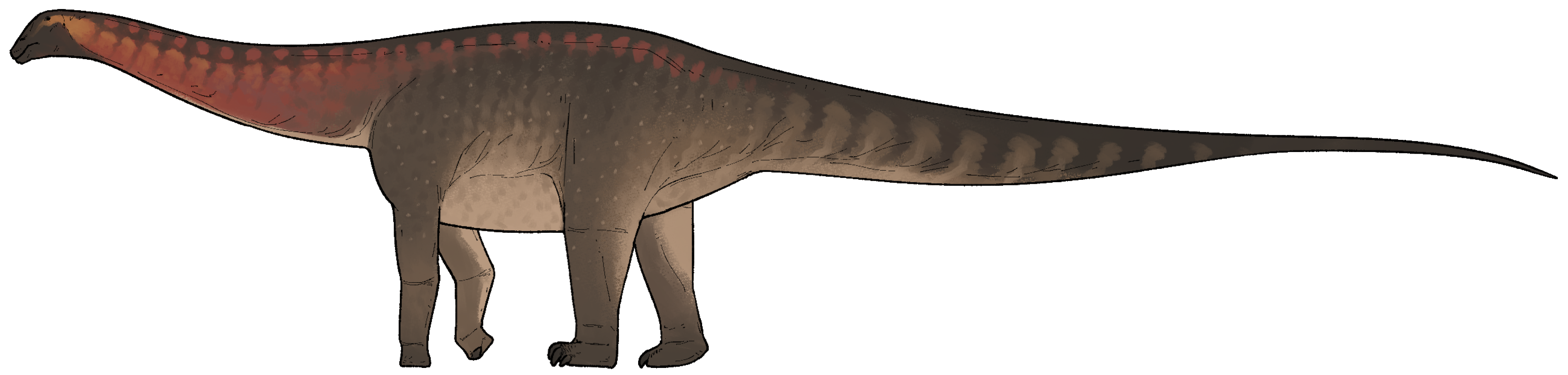
Life restoration

The Sidersaura fossil material was discovered in 2012 in sediments from the base of the Huincul Formation (Barda Atravesada de Las Campanas locality) in Cañadón de las Campanas near Villa El Chocón of Neuquén Province, Argentina. The bones were then excavated over the course of five years, during which the holotype of the giant carcharodontosaurid Meraxes was also found.

The holotype specimen, MMCh-PV 70, belonging to a mature individual, consists of a braincase fused to the skull roof and partial neurocranium, partial dorsal vertebrae, fourteen caudal vertebrae with some haemal arches, a partial left scapula, right pubic peduncle, part of both tibiae and fibulae, and several bones from the feet, including metatarsals, phalanges, ungual phalanges.

Additional specimens were also assigned as paratypes. MMCh-PV 236, belonging to a mature individual, was found in close proximity to the holotype of Meraxes, about 20 metres (66 ft) from the other Sidersaura specimens. It includes an indeterminate vertebra (likely a sacral or caudal), a dorsal rib, two metacarpals, a partial pelvic girdle including an incomplete ilium, ischia, and pubes, and the left femur and fibula. Additional bones of this specimen, including sacral neural arches, caudal vertebrae, the right femur, left tibia, right fibula, and a metatarsal, have also been found but are currently not prepared. MMCh-PV 307, also from a mature individual, is a partial left fibula. MMCh-PV 309, belonging to a juvenile individual, consists of a dorsal centrum.

In January, 2024, Lerzo et al. described Sidersaura marae as a new genus and species of rebbachisaurid sauropod based on these fossil remains. The generic name, "Sidersaura", combines the Latin word "sidus, sideris", meaning "star"—in reference to the shape of some of the preserved haemal arches—and "saura", the feminine declension of the Greek word "sauros", meaning "lizard" or "reptile". The specific name, "marae", honors fossil preparator and MMCh-PV director Mara Ripoll.

== Description ==
Sidersaura was a very large rebbachisaurid. Aside from the controversial giant sauropod Maraapunisaurus which may be a rebbachisaurid, Sidersaura may represent one of the largest known members of this group, at around 18–20 metres (59–66 ft) long and 15 tons in weight.

The left femur (MMCh-PV 236) of Sidersaura is 1.55 metres (5.1 ft) long, thus representing the largest known rebbachisaurid femur; other large femurs include those of Limaysaurus, at 1.44 metres (4.7 ft) long, and Comahuesaurus, at 1.13 metres (3.7 ft) long. The femur of Amphicoelias altus, a diplodocid from the Late Jurassic Morrison Formation of the United States estimated at 18 metres (59 ft) in length, was similar in size, at 1.52 metres (5.0 ft).

Several unique features are seen in the Sidersaura fossil material that differentiate it from all other species. For example, Sidersaura is the first rebbachisaurid known to have a frontoparietal foramen, a feature otherwise seen only in dicraeosaurids, the related Apatosaurus, and Spinophorosaurus, a basal sauropod. The crescent-shaped calcaneum is different from any other sauropod, more closely resembling basal sauropods such as Vulcanodon than other neosauropods. The haemal arches are also unusual, bearing two sets of projections that give them a star shape. While this is not seen in any other named species, an unnamed rebbachisaurid specimen from the geologically older Candeleros Formation—originally described in 2011 as belonging to a titanosaur—also has a similar haemal arch morphology, indicating the two taxa may be related. Some features of the caudal vertebrae are also seen in titanosaurs, having been previously thought to be synapomorphies of that group.

== Classification ==
Skeletal diagram showing known material of the closely related Itapeuasaurus

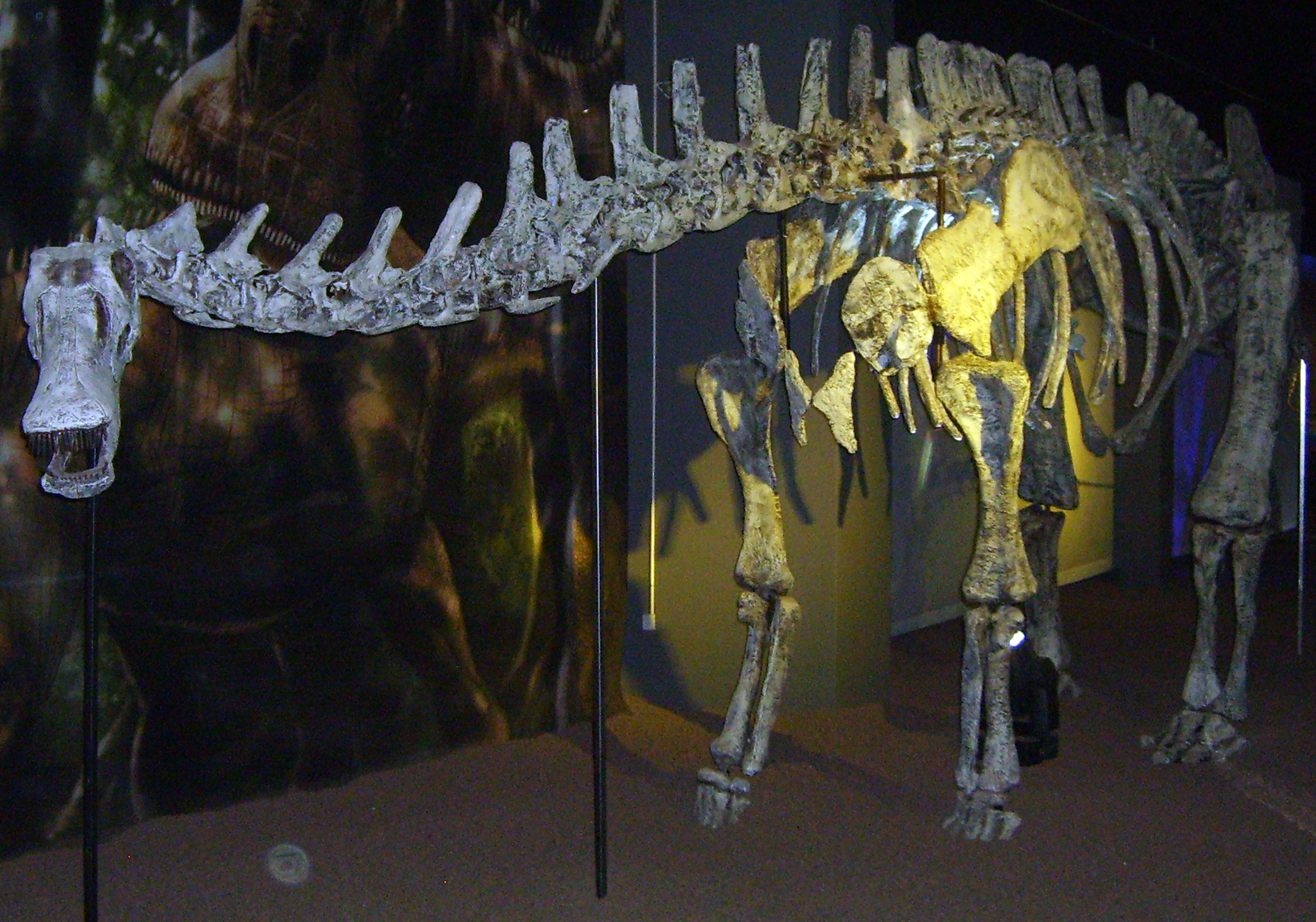
Restored skeleton of the distantly related but contemporary Limaysaurus

Lerzo et al. (2024) recovered Sidersaura as a rebbachisaurid member of the sauropod clade Diplodocoidea, as the sister taxon to Itapeuasaurus in a clade also containing Zapalasaurus. This group is not particularly closely related to Limaysaurus and Cathartesaura (sometimes recovered in a clade called Limaysaurinae), the two other rebbachisaurids named from the Huincul Formation. Sidersaura was one of the last rebbachisaurids known before the clade went extinct at the end of the Turonian age. The results of the phylogenetic analyses of Lerzo et al. are shown in the cladogram below:

- Diplodocoidea
  - Flagellicaudata
  - Rebbachisauridae
    - Amazonsaurus
    - - Histriasaurus
      - - Comahuesaurus
        - - - Zapalasaurus
            - - Sidersaura
              - Itapeuasaurus
          - - Lavocatisaurus
            - Khebbashia
              - Limaysaurinae
                - Limaysaurus
                - Cathartesaura
              - Rebbachisaurinae
                - Katepensaurus
                - - Rebbachisaurus
                  - - Nigersaurus
                    - - Demandasaurus
                      - Tataouinea

Later in 2024, Lerzo et al. described Campananeyen, a rebbachisaurid from the Candeleros Formation. They recovered it as the sister taxon to Sidersaura, with similar phylogenetic relationships to the original Sidersaura description, albeit with Itapeuasaurus as a later diverging taxon.

== Palaeobiology ==
The neurocranial anatomy of Sidersaura indicates that its hearing capabilities were convergent with those of small theropods, possibly suggesting adaptations for protecting juveniles from predation by small theropods. It has also been proposed that Sidersaura communicated via beak-clapping.

== Palaeoenvironment ==
Size of several dinosaurs from the Huincul Formation compared to a human

Sidersaura is known from the Early Cretaceous Huincul Formation of Río Negro Province, Argentina. Many dinosaurs, including fellow rebbachisaurids (Astigmasaura, Cathartesaura, Cienciargentina, and remains historically referred to Limaysaurus), titanosaurs (Argentinosaurus, Bustingorrytitan, Chucarosaurus, and Choconsaurus), carcharodontosaurids (Mapusaurus, Meraxes, and Taurovenator), a megaraptoran (Aoniraptor), abelisaurids (Skorpiovenator, Tralkasaurus, and Ilokelesia), an elaphrosaurine (Huinculsaurus), a paravian (Overoraptor), and the unusual avetheropod Gualicho have also been named from the formation. Remains of unenlagiids, iguanodonts, and elasmarian ornithopods are also known.
