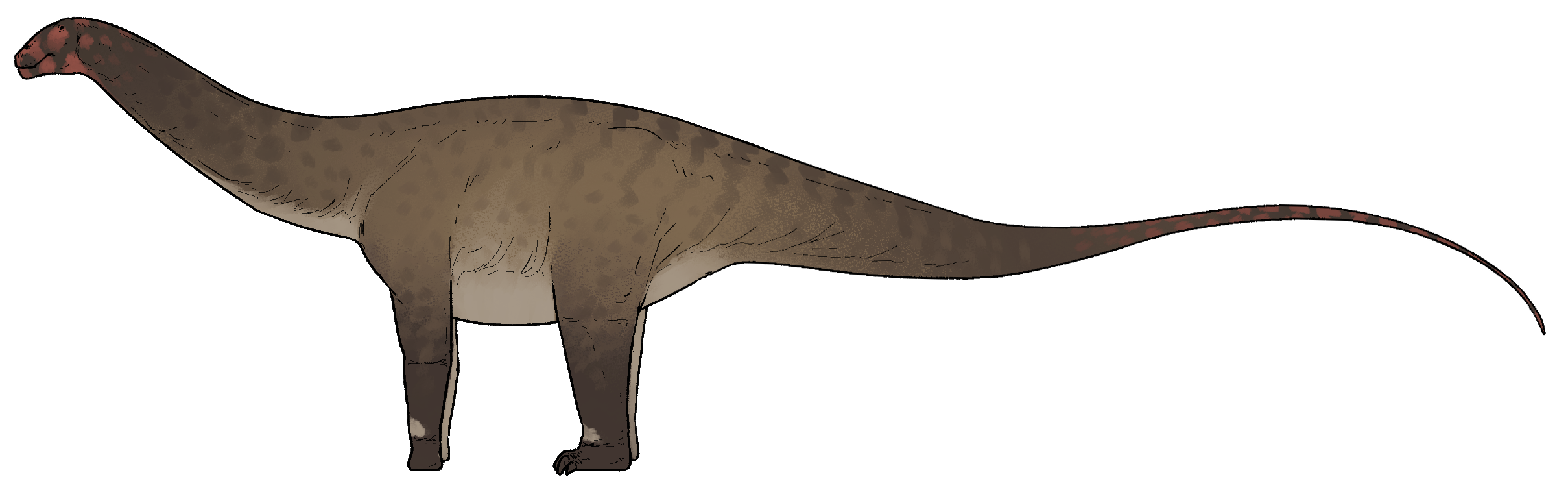
- Life restoration

Scientific classification
- Kingdom: Animalia
- Phylum: Chordata
- Class: Reptilia
- Clade: Dinosauria
- Clade: Saurischia
- Clade: †Sauropodomorpha
- Clade: †Sauropoda
- Superfamily: †Diplodocoidea
- Family: †Rebbachisauridae
- Genus: †Campananeyen; Lerzo et al., 2024
- Species: †C. fragilissimus

Binomial name
- †Campananeyen fragilissimus Lerzo et al., 2024

= Campananeyen =

Campananeyen Temporal range: Albian, ~111–106 Ma

Genus of rebbachisaurid dinosaurs

Campananeyen is a genus of rebbachisaurid sauropod dinosaur from the Early Cretaceous (Albian) Candeleros Formation of Argentina. The genus contains a single species, Campananeyen fragilissimus, known from a fragmentary skeleton.

== Discovery and naming ==
The Campananeyen holotype specimen, MMch-PV 71, was discovered in sediments of the Candeleros Formation (Barda Atravesada de Las Campanas locality) near Villa El Chocón in Neuquén Province, Argentina. The specimen consists of an incomplete skeleton, including the braincase and the right quadrate from the skull, a partial dorsal, sacral, and caudal vertebra, pieces of the ilia, and two ungual phalanges. The cranial remains were described in a scientific paper published in 2016, but left unnamed.

In 2024, Lerzo et al. described the specimen as a new genus and species of rebbachisaurid. The generic name, Campananeyen, is derived from Las Campanas—the name of the type locality—combined with the Mapundungun n'eyen', meaning "air", referring to the extreme pneumatic qualities of the holotype. The specific name, fragilissimus, means "the most fragile" in Latin, in reference to the notably thin ilium.

== Description ==
The braincase of Campananeyen exhibits several unique characteristics. The crista prootica was poorly developed, and the foramen for cranial nerve VII, the facial nerve, was open anterior to the crista prootica instead of posterior to it as in Limaysaurus. The paroccipital process was pneumatized. The quadrate fossa, a large fossa on the posterior surface of the quadrate bone, is greatly expanded laterally; all rebbachisaurids have a large quadrate fossa, but that of Campananenyen is 30—70% larger than any other known rebbachisaurid. The quadrate condyle, which formed the jaw joint, was more similar to Nigersaurus than Limaysaurus in that the medial hemicondyle was twice as wide as the lateral condyle.

Most rebbachisaurids lack the hyposphene-hypantrum articulation between the vertebrae, but Campananeyen is one of the few that has hyposphene-hypantrum articulations. The hyposphene of Campananeyen is ovoid and hollow posteriorly, as in Nigersaurus and an unnamed species from the La Amarga Formation, and unlike the usual rhomboid hyposphene of most sauropods.

As in other rebbachisaurids, the ilium contained pneumatic chambers. Due to the extensive pneumatization, the ilium was thin and fragile, and uniquely to Campananeyen the sacral ribs exhibit a dorsal alar arm that would have reinforced the pelvis to better support the leg muscles, particularly the m. iliotibialis.

== Classification ==
In their 2024 phylogenetic analyses, Lerzo et al. consistently recovered Campananeyen as the sister taxon of Sidersaura, within the Rebbachisauridae, in a clade also containing Zapalasaurus. Their results are displayed in the cladogram below. Specimen MACN-Pv-N 35, an unnamed rebbachisaurid from the La Amarga Formation represented by a single partial vertebra, may also be closely related to these taxa, but it was removed from most analyses to obtain more resolved results.

- Diplodocoidea
  - Flagellicaudata
  - Rebbachisauridae
    - Amazonsaurus
    - - - Zapalasaurus
        - - Campananeyen
          - Sidersaura
      - - Itapeuasaurus
        - - - Lavocatisaurus
            - Comahuesaurus
          - Khebbashia
            - Nigersaurinae
              - Agustinia
              - - Nigersaurus
                - - Tataouinea
                  - Demandasaurus
            - Rebbachisaurinae
              - Rayososaurus
              - Rebbachisaurus
              - - Limaysaurus
                - - Katepensaurus
                  - Cathartesaura

== Paleoenvironment ==
The Candeleros Formation is interpreted as a desert depositional environment, representing the Kokorkom Desert, with some oases in it, and fossils representing a faunal assemblage typical of Middle Cretaceous ecosystems in the western remnants of Gondwana. Originally suggested to be the Cenomanian age of the Late Cretaceous, the maximum depositional age of both the Candeleros Formation and the overlying Huincul Formation is re-dated to the early Albian by Maniel et al. (2026), approximately 111.4 ± 1.1 Ma and 106.2 ± 1.0 Ma respectively.

The Barda Atravesada de Las Campanas locality from which Campananeyen was recovered has also yielded partial skeletal remains of another rebbachisaurid, a small unnamed abelisaurid, a chelid turtle, and a sphenodontian. Several animals are also known from other localities within the formation. The dinosaurs include several more rebbachisaurid sauropods (Limaysaurus, Nopcsaspondylus, and Rayososaurus) in addition to titanosaurian sauropods (Andesaurus and an unnamed giant form), diverse theropods (Alnashetri, Bicentenaria, Buitreraptor, Ekrixinatosaurus, and Giganotosaurus), and the enigmatic possible thyreophoran Jakapil. Other animals include rhynchocephalians (Tika and Priosphenodon), the snake Najash, multiple species of the crocodyliform Araripesuchus, and the mammal Cronopio.
