= Astigmasaura =

Astigmasaura Temporal range: Early Cretaceous (Albian), 106.2 Ma

Scientific classification
- Kingdom: Animalia
- Phylum: Chordata
- Class: Reptilia
- Clade: Dinosauria
- Clade: Saurischia
- Clade: †Sauropodomorpha
- Clade: †Sauropoda
- Clade: †Eusauropoda
- Superfamily: †Diplodocoidea
- Family: †Rebbachisauridae
- Genus: †Astigmasaura; Bellardini et al., 2025
- Species: †A. genuflexa

Binomial name
- †Astigmasaura genuflexa Bellardini et al., 2025

Genus of rebbachisaurid dinosaurs

Astigmasaura is an extinct genus of rebbachisaurid sauropod dinosaurs from the Early Cretaceous Huincul Formation of Argentina. The genus contains a single species, Astigmasaura genuflexa, known from an incomplete articulated skeleton.

== Discovery and naming ==
The Astigmasaura holotype specimen, MAU-Pv-EO-629, was discovered in 2017 in outcrops of the lower Huincul Formation near a YPF oil field ('El Orejano' locality) in northeastern Neuquén Province, Argentina. The specimen is incomplete but fully articulated, comprising 20 caudal vertebrae, 19 haemal arches, most of the pelvic girdle (both ischia, pubes, and the bottom part of the right ilium), both femora, tibiae, fibulae, and astragalae, all five metatarsals from both feet, four right and five left proximal phalanges, and two left pedal unguals (foot claws).

The remains were preliminary described in 2024 by Flavio Bellardini and colleagues, who described the specimen as belonging to an indeterminate basal rebbachisaurid. Since preparation on the specimen was still ongoing, the researchers did not refer the bones to a new or existing taxon.

In 2025, Bellardini et al. described Astigmasaura genuflexa as a new genus and species of rebbachisaurid sauropod based on these fossil remains. The generic name, Astigmasaura, combines the compound Latin word astigma, meaning "without signs", with "saura", the feminine declension of with the Ancient Greek σαῦρος (sauros), meaning "lizard". This references the type locality, El Orejano, which is named from a Spanish word referring to ownerless animals, or those without identification signs, as local farmers mark animals by signs on their ears. The specific name, genuflexa, combines the Medieval Latin words genu, meaning "knee" and flecto, meaning "to flex" ('kneeling'), in reference to the discovery of the holotype with both hindlimbs angled backward.

== Classification ==
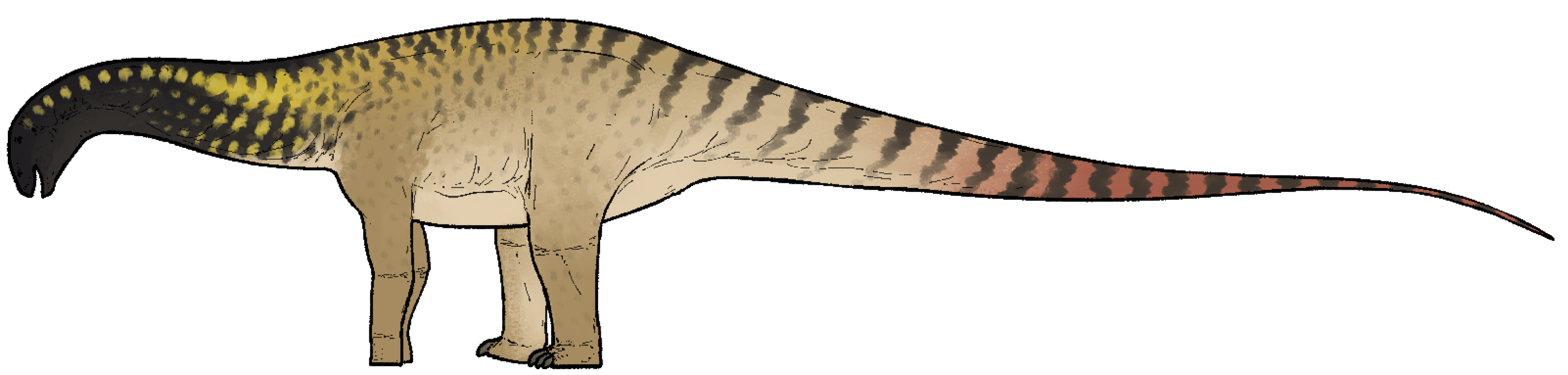
Speculative life restoration

In their 2025 phylogenetic analyses, Bellardini and colleagues recovered Astigmasaura as a member of the family Rebbachisauridae within the sauropod clade Diplodocoidea, as the sister taxon to the clade formed by Itapeuasaurus and Sidersaura. These results are displayed in the cladogram below:

- Diplodocoidea
  - Flagellicaudata
  - Rebbachisauridae
    - Amazonsaurus
    - - Histriasaurus
      - - - Astigmasaura
          - - Itapeuasaurus
            - Sidersaura
        - - Lavocatisaurus
          - Khebbashia
            - Limaysaurus
            - Rebbachisaurinae
              - Katepensaurus
              - - Demandasaurus
                - Nigersaurus
                - Tataouinea
                - Rebbachisaurus

== Paleoenvironment ==
Size of several dinosaurs from the Huincul Formation compared to a human (Astigmasaura not shown)

Astigmasaura is known from the lower section of the Huincul Formation, which dates to the Albian age of the Early Cretaceous period. Many other rebbachisaurids (Cathartesaura, Cienciargentina, Sidersaura, and remains historically referred to Limaysaurus) are also known from this formation. This diversity implies rebbachisaurids were a key part of the faunal turnover occurring in the mid-Cretaceous.

Many other dinosaurs have been named from the formation. Other sauropods include the titanosaurs Argentinosaurus, Bustingorrytitan, Choconsaurus, and Chucarosaurus. Theropods are also abundant, including carcharodontosaurids (Mapusaurus, Meraxes, and Taurovenator), a megaraptoran (Aoniraptor), abelisaurids (Skorpiovenator, Tralkasaurus, and Ilokelesia), a probable noasaurid (Huinculsaurus), a paravian (Overoraptor), and the unusual avetheropod Gualicho. The elasmarian ornithopod Chakisaurus is the only ornithischian dinosaur named from the formation. Remains of unnamed unenlagiids and iguanodonts are also known. Non-dinosaurian animals known from the Huincul Formation include the rhynchocephalians Kaikaifilusaurus and Patagosphenos and various crocodyliforms, turtles, lizards, and fishes. Plant remains include the trunks of conifers (Araucariaceae and Cupressaceae), cycads, and early angiosperms.
