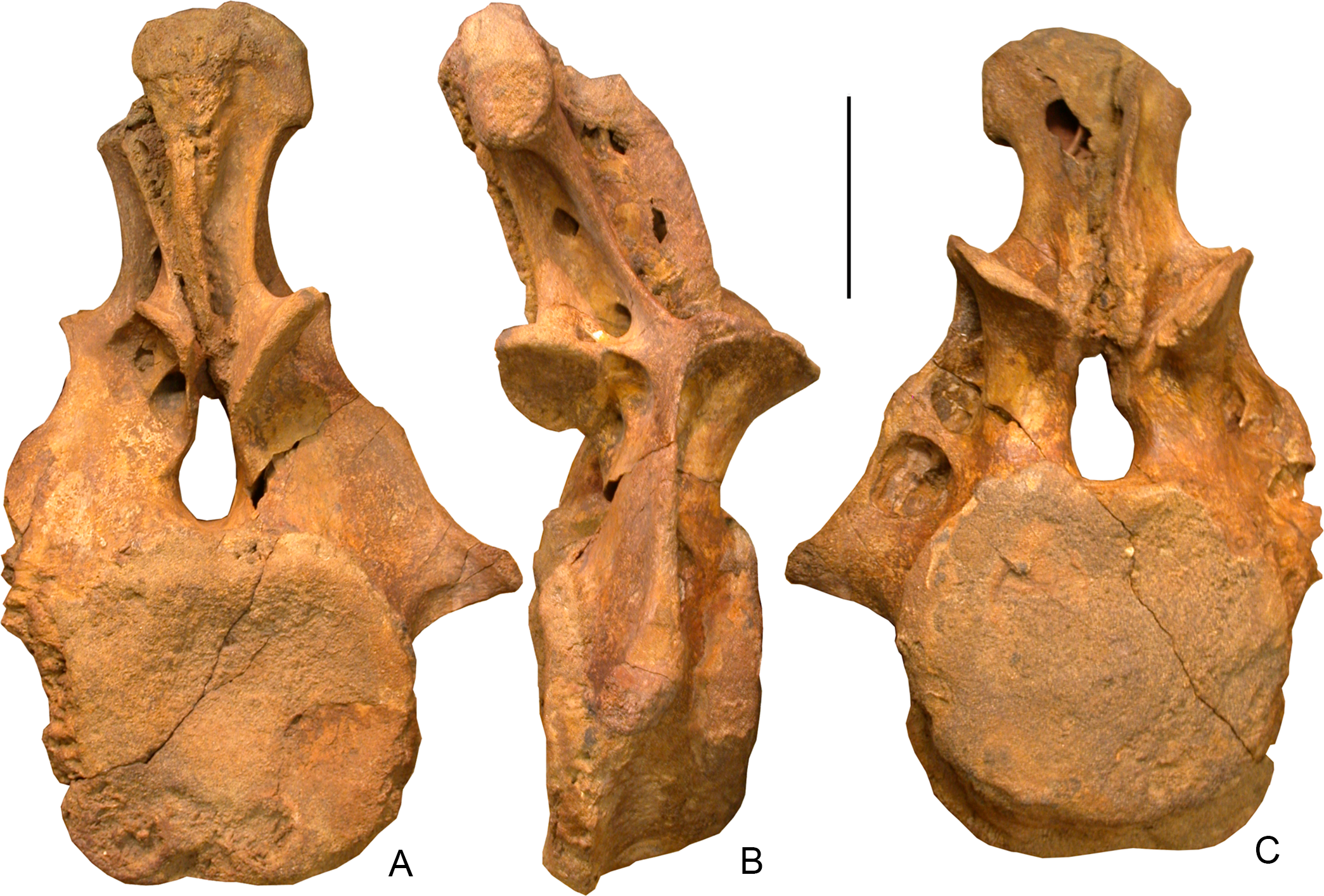
- Holotype vertebra seen from three different angles

Scientific classification
- Kingdom: Animalia
- Phylum: Chordata
- Class: Reptilia
- Clade: Dinosauria
- Clade: Saurischia
- Clade: †Sauropodomorpha
- Clade: †Sauropoda
- Clade: †Macronaria
- Clade: †Titanosauria
- Genus: †Dzharatitanis; Averianov & Sues, 2021
- Species: †D. kingi

Binomial name
- †Dzharatitanis kingi Averianov & Sues, 2021

= Dzharatitanis =

Dzharatitanis Temporal range: Late Cretaceous, ~92–90 Ma Turonian

Extinct genus of titanosaurian dinosaurs

Dzharatitanis (meaning "Dzharakuduk titan") is an extinct genus of probable titanosaurian sauropod dinosaur from the Late Cretaceous (Turonian age) Bissekty Formation of Uzbekistan. The genus contains a single species, Dzharatitanis kingi, known from a single tail vertebra. Dzharatitanis was considered to be a member of the Rebbachisauridae when it was named in 2021, but subsequent research has considered it to be a titanosaur.

== Discovery and naming ==
The Dzharatitanis holotype specimen, USNM 538127, was found in 1997 by Hans-Dieter Sues and David J. Ward during the joint URBAC (Uzbek/Russian/British/American/Canadian) expedition to Uzbekistan. It was collected in outcrops of the Bissekty Formation ('Dzharakuduk' locality) in the Navoiy Region of the country. The specimen consists of a single anterior caudal vertebra, likely representing the first caudal. Prior to being named, it was identified as belonging to a somphospondylan sauropod in multiple publications. In his 2005 description of the skull of Nemegtosaurus Jeffrey A. Wilson noted that the anatomy of the vertebra may indicate affinities with the titanosaur subfamily Opisthocoelicaudiinae. Sues et al. (2015) identified USNM 538127—in addition to several other bones from the Bissekty Formation, including a braincase, cervical, dorsal, and caudal vertebrae, and material from the limbs and digits—as belonging to an indeterminate titanosaur. The authors noted that the shape of the transverse process is similar to most sauropods except flagellicaudatans and many rebbachisaurids. Averianov and Sues (2017) detailed the similarities of the Bissekty titanosaur material, including USNM 538127, to the Chinese somphospondylans Dongyangosaurus and Baotianmansaurus.

In 2021, Alexander Averianov and Hans-Dieter Sues described Dzharatitanis kingi as a new genus and species of rebbachisaurid sauropod, contrasting with earlier identifications. The generic name, Dzharatitanis, combines a reference to the type locality (Dzharakuduk) with "-titanis", after the titans in ancient Greek mythology. The specific name, kingi, honors Christopher King, a geologist who studied the Cretaceous rock layers of Central Asia.

== Classification ==
In their 2021 phylogenetic analysis, Averianov and Sues placed Dzharatitanis in the Rebbachisauridae, in an unresolved polytomy with Demandasaurus, Nigersaurus, Rayososaurus and Rebbachisaurus. The taxon shares with Demandasaurus and an unnamed putative rebbachisaur from the Wessex Formation a high spinodiapophyseal lamina on the lateral side of the neural spine, separated from the spinoprezygapophyseal lamina and spinopostzygapophyseal lamina, which may indicate a close relationship between these taxa. These results are shown in the cladogram below:

- Rebbachisauridae
  - Amazonsaurus
  - - Zapalasaurus
    - Histriasaurus
    - - Comahuesaurus
      - - Rayososaurus
        - Rebbachisaurus
        - Demandasaurus
        - Nigersaurus
        - Dzharatitanis
        - - Cathartesaura
          - Limaysaurus

However, a study published a few months later by Lerzo, Carballido & Gallina disputed this classification, finding it to be a titanosaur instead, in agreement with the original identifications. When the authors rescored the holotype based on reinterpretations of the anatomy in the same dataset used by Averianov & Sues (2021), Dzharatitanis was recovered as a somphospondylan within the Titanosauriformes, rather than a rebbachisaurid. The researchers also tested the relationships of the taxon in a combined and modified version of two other datasets—Rauhut et al. (2015), focused on diplodocoids, and Gallina et al. (2021), focused on titanosaurs—which further supported titanosaur affinities. When the holotype was scored in this matrix simply as an anterior caudal vertebra, it was recovered within the Lognkosauria, a clade containing the giant titanosaurs Patagotitan and Argentinosaurus. When scored specifically as the first caudal vertebra, the placement of Dzharatitanis moved outside of the lognkosaurs to clade as the sister taxon of Baurutitan. These two alternate positions are displayed in the cladogram below.

- Titanosauria
  - Andesaurus
  - - Epachthosaurus
    - - - - Rinconsaurus
          - - Muyelensaurus
            - - Aeolosaurus
              - Overosaurus
        - - Bonitasaura
          - - Notocolossus
            - Lognkosauria
              - Mendozasaurus
              - - Dzharatitanis
                - - - Futalognkosaurus
                    - Quetecsaurus
                  - - Drusilasaura
                    - Puertasaurus
                    - - Argentinosaurus
                      - Patagotitan
      - - Dreadnoughtus
        - - Malawisaurus
          - - - Baurutitan
              - Dzharatitanis
            - - Nemegtosaurus
              - Trigonosaurus
              - Alamosaurus
              - Opisthocoelicaudia
              - Saltasaurus
              - Neuquensaurus
              - - Rapetosaurus
                - - Tapuiasaurus
                  - Isisaurus

A later 2022 study further reinforced the remarkable similarity of the Dzharatitanis holotype caudal vertebra to the contemporary Asian sauropod Dongyangosaurus (a comparison made by Averianov and Sues in 2017). Dongyangosaurus is a somphospondylan, but its phylogenetic placement within or outside of Titanosauria is somewhat uncertain.
