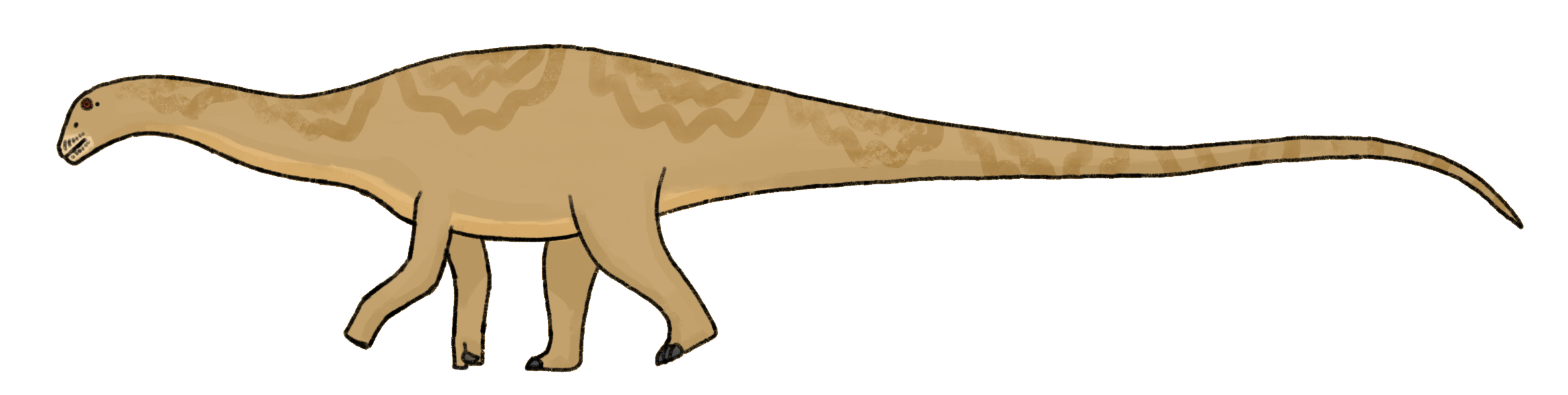
- Speculative life restoration

Scientific classification
- Kingdom: Animalia
- Phylum: Chordata
- Class: Reptilia
- Clade: Dinosauria
- Clade: Saurischia
- Clade: †Sauropodomorpha
- Clade: †Sauropoda
- Superfamily: †Diplodocoidea
- Family: †Rebbachisauridae
- Genus: †Agustinia; Bonaparte, 1999
- Species: †A. ligabuei

Binomial name
- †Agustinia ligabuei Bonaparte, 1999

= Agustinia =

Agustinia Temporal range: Early Cretaceous, 116–108 Ma

Genus of sauropod dinosaurs

Agustinia (/ɑːɡəˈstɪniə/) is a genus of sauropod dinosaur from the Early Cretaceous of South America. The genus contains a single species, A. ligabuei, known from a single specimen that was recovered from the Lohan Cura Formation of Neuquén Province in Argentina. It lived about 116–108 million years ago, in the Aptian–Albian stages of the Early Cretaceous Period.

== Discovery and naming ==
The holotype and only known specimen of Agustinia, MCF-PVPH-110, was discovered in 1997 by an expedition from the Museo Argentino de Ciencias Naturales in Buenos Aires, a few kilometers west of the city of Picún Leufú in the south of the Neuquén province. The rocks of the site belong stratigraphically to the upper section of the Lohan-Cura Formation . This excursion was part of a program run by the museum in 1996 and 1997 to discover new vertebrate fossils in the Lohan-Cura Formation.

The generic name Agustinia honors then-student Agustin Martinelli, who discovered the skeleton and was part of the excavation team of the Museo Argentino de Ciencias Naturales. It was first mentioned in an abstract written by Argentine paleontologist Jose Bonaparte, and published in a full paper in 1999. The specific name, ligabuei, honors Dr. Giancarlo Ligabue, a philanthropist who provided financial support to the expedition which recovered the remains.

== Description ==
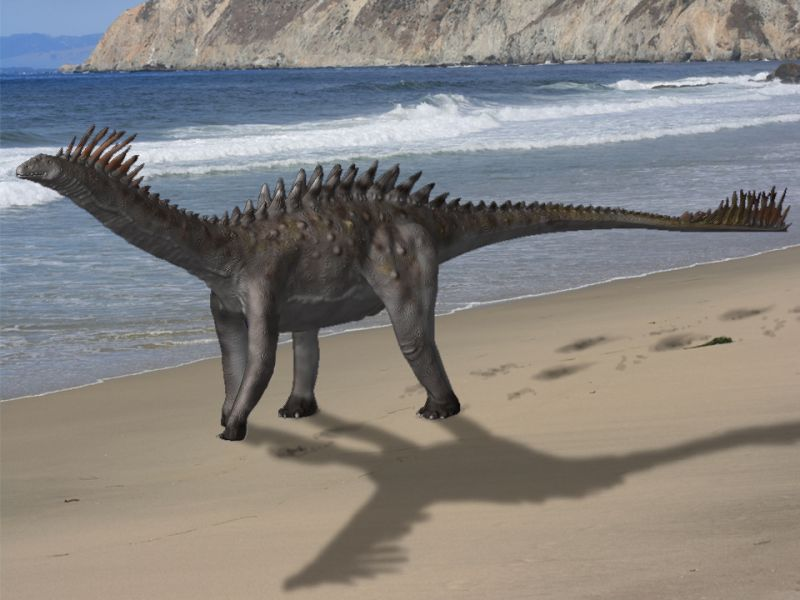
An outdated restoration of Agustinia showing extensive osteoderms, now believed to be fragments of rib and hip bones

Only fragmentary remains of Agustinia are known. These include fragments of vertebrae from the back, hips, and tail regions of the spinal column. Parts of the lower hind limb were also recovered, consisting of a fibula, tibia, and five metatarsals. A femur (thigh bone) was found at the site, but was too fragmented to collect.

Agustinia was known for its distinctive supposed armor plates, called osteoderms, initially interpreted as a series of wide, vertical spikes and plates down the center of its back, somewhat like the unrelated Stegosaurus. However, subsequent research has challenged the interpretation of these elements as osteoderms. Further study of the poorly preserved fossil material showed that these "plates" were in fact more likely to be fragments of ribs and hip bones. This reassessment was reaffirmed subsequently by histology of the purported osteoderms, which do not match the internal structure of other titanosaurian osteoderms. The fragmentary hip bone was tentatively identified as part of the ilium.

A fibula (lower leg bone) has been recovered that is about 895 millimetres (35.2 in) long. When compared to the same bone in related dinosaurs, this indicates that Agustinia may have been about 15 metres (49 ft) long. The lower half of the tibia was thin when viewed from the front (anteroposterior), indicating that the tibia was thinner than that of titanosaurs such as Antarctosaurus or Saltasaurus. The pedal elements are comparable to those of the titanosaurs.

The remains are fragmentary and do not have many distinctive characteristics which can be used to separate it from other sauropods. Because of this, some authors have considered Agustinia a nomen dubium for being based on inadequate remains to compare with related dinosaurs. However, Bellardini et al. (2022) considered it to be valid on the basis of unique morphological characteristics observed in the vertebrae.

== Classification ==
Because of its supposedly unusual armor, Agustinia was originally assigned to its own family, Agustiniidae. This family name has not come into wide acceptance. Agustinia is difficult to classify because of its fragmentary nature, and because it exhibits features of both diplodocoid and titanosaurian sauropods. What few distinctive features do exist in the holotype specimen prompted Kristina Curry Rogers to classify Agustinia as a lithostrotian titanosaur in 2005, but Mannion et al. (2013) classified it as a member of the more basal clade Somphospondyli. In contrast, D'emic et al (2009) concluded that no diagnostic features were present that would allow a classification within the Diplodocoidea or Titanosauria, and therefore classified Agustinia as Neosauropoda incertae sedis.

A 2022 publication by Flavio Bellardini et al. found sufficient evidence to classify Agustinia as a rebbachisaurid within the Diplodocoidea, more derived than Amazonsaurus. The cladogram below displays the results of their phylogenetic analyses:

- Diplodocoidea
  - Flagellicaudata
  - Rebbachisauridae
    - Amazonsaurus
    - - Agustinia
      - - Zapalasaurus
        - Histriasaurus
        - - Agustinia
          - - Comahuesaurus
            - - Lavocatisaurus
              - - Limaysaurus
                - - Katepensaurus
                  - - Demandasaurus
                    - Nigersaurus
                    - Tataouinea
                    - Rebbachisaurus

In their 2024 description of Campananeyen, Lerzo et al. also found support for a rebbachisaurid position of Agustinia, although their analysis favored affinities closer to the Nigersaurinae within Khebbashia.

== Palaeoenvironment ==
Skeletal reconstruction of the related contemporary Comahuesaurus

Agustinia is known from the Early Cretaceous Lohan Cura Formation of Neuquén Province, Argentina. Other dinosaurs, including fellow rebbachisaurid Comahuesaurus and somphospondylan Ligabuesaurus have also been named from the formation. Remains of turtles, including two species of Prochelidella, are also known.
