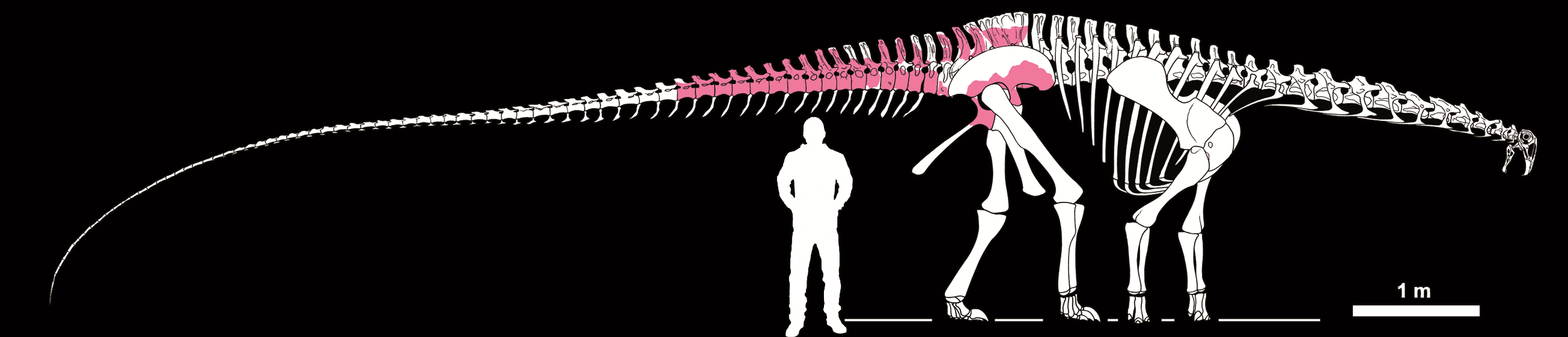
- Reconstructed skeleton (with unknown elements based on Nigersaurus), with known elements in pink

Scientific classification
- Kingdom: Animalia
- Phylum: Chordata
- Class: Reptilia
- Clade: Dinosauria
- Clade: Saurischia
- Clade: †Sauropodomorpha
- Clade: †Sauropoda
- Superfamily: †Diplodocoidea
- Family: †Rebbachisauridae
- Genus: †Tataouinea; Fanti et al., 2013
- Species: †T. hannibalis

Binomial name
- †Tataouinea hannibalis Fanti et al., 2013

= Tataouinea =

Tataouinea Temporal range: Albian 113–100.5 Ma

Extinct genus of dinosaurs

Tataouinea is an extinct genus of sauropod dinosaur in the subfamily Rebbachisaurinae of Rebbachisauridae which lived in the Early Cretaceous of Tunisia. Only one species, T. hannibalis, is known.

== Discovery and naming ==
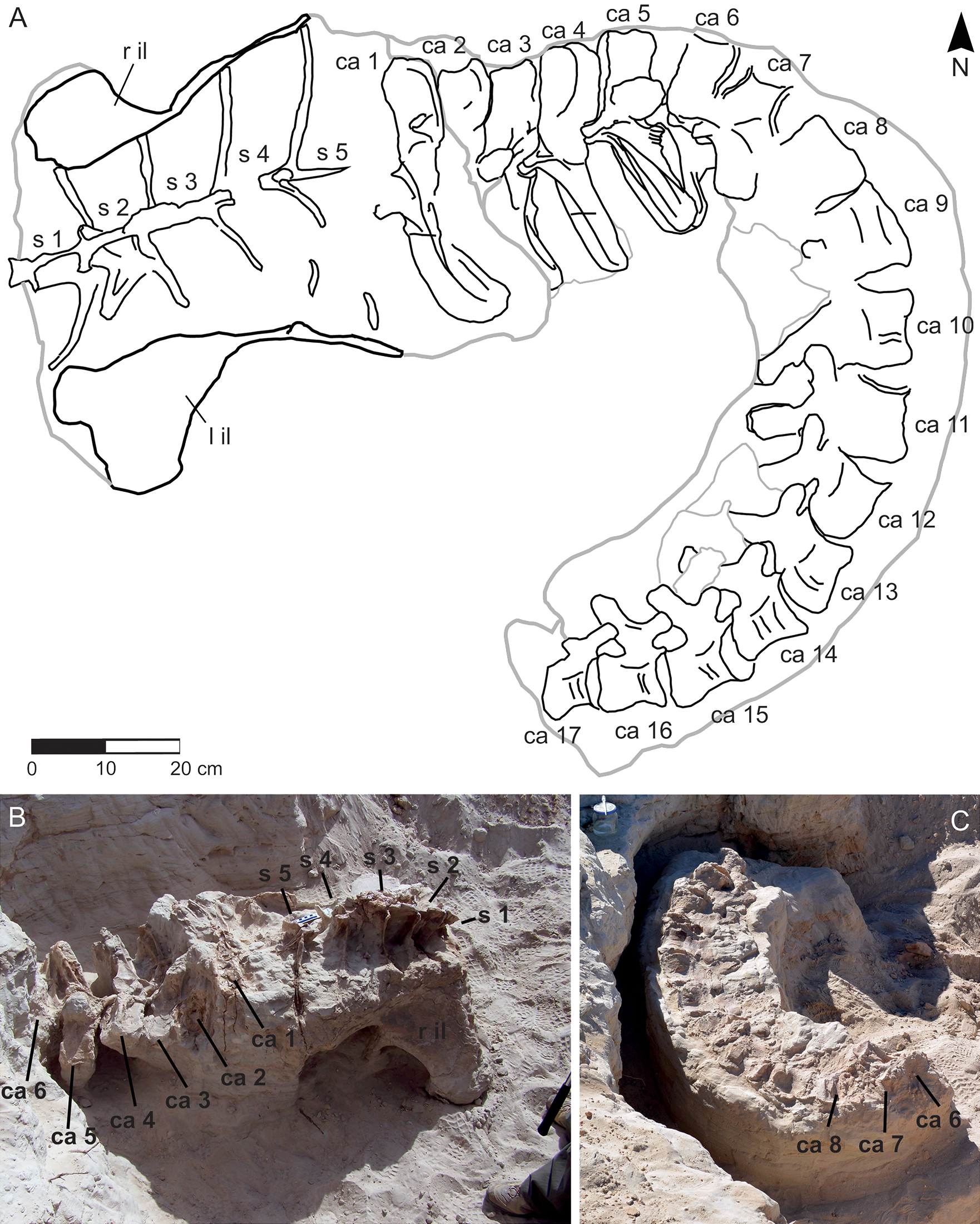
Type specimen in situ

The first known elements of the holotype were discovered in the Aïn el Guettar Formation in 2011 by Aldo Luigi Bacchetta, but he was unable to excavate the specimen until 2012. The remains were subsequently studied by Federico Fanti, Andrea Cau, Mohsen Hassine and Michela Contessi. The genus was named in 2013. The name refers to the Tataouine Governatorate, Tunisia, and Hannibal. In 2015 more material of the holotype specimen was uncovered after the initial description were analysed. These included additional tail vertebrae.

== Description ==
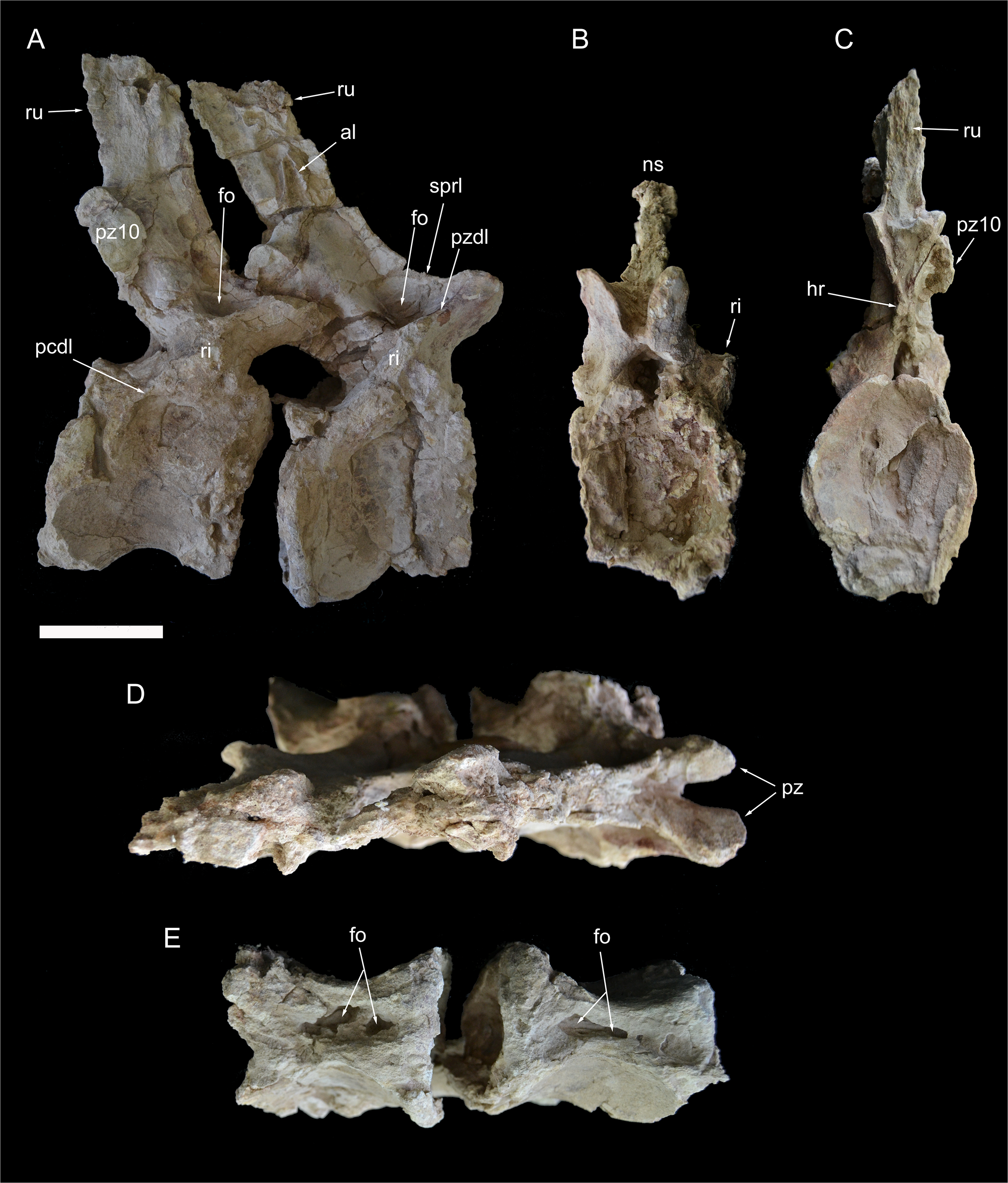
Tail vertebrae 8 and 9

Its bones were extensively pneumatic, providing strong support for the theory that sauropods had birdlike respiratory systems. Key characteristics of its vertebral morphology show that Tatouinea was a rebbachisaurid, closely related to the nigersaurines of Europe. A phylogenetic analysis was published alongside the paper, finding a clade of nigersaurines to include Rebbachisaurus, thus forcing the subfamily to be renamed Rebbachisaurinae.

The exact size of Tataouinea is unknown, but comparison to similar sauropods indicates a size of about 14 metres (46 ft) meters long and a height of around 2.5 metres (8.2 ft) at the hips for the holotype individual.

== Etymology ==
The genus name bears the name of the region where it was discovered, Tataouine, and the epithet honours Hannibal, a Carthaginian Punic military commander.

== Classification ==
Tataouinea was placed in the Rebbachisaurinae by Fanti et al. (2015). The 2015 cladogram of Fanti et al. is shown below.

- Rebbachisauridae
  - Amazonsaurus
  - - Zapalasaurus
    - Histriasaurus
    - Comahuesaurus
    - Khebbashia
      - Limaysaurinae
        - Cathartesaura
        - Limaysaurus
      - Rebbachisaurinae
        - Katepensaurus
        - - Nigersaurus
          - - Rebbachisaurus
            - Demandasaurus
            - Tataouinea

== Paleoecology ==
Tataouinea was discovered in the Jebel El Mra Member or the nearby Oum ed Diab Member of the Aptian-Albian Aïn el Guettar Formation. It coexisted with an unnamed carcharodontosaurid, Carcharodontosaurus, Spinosaurus, the notosuchian Araripesuchus, an unnamed sauropod, an unnamed iguanodont, an unnamed ornithocheirid pterosaur, an unnamed species of Sarcosuchus and a species of fish known as Mawsonia.
