= Leonardo Salgado =

Argentine paleontologist

Leonardo Salgado is an Argentine palaeontologist with a special interest in dinosaurs of the Cretaceous period and other investigations of the palaeobiology of fossil bearing geological formations. Salgado is the leading or coauthor of several taxa, notably the large carnivorous species, Giganotosaurus carolinii, discovered in Patagonia.

Below is a list of taxa that Salgado has contributed to naming:

Year	Taxon	Authors
2025	Cienciargentina sanchezi gen. et sp. nov.	Simón & Salgado
2024	Titanomachya gimenezi gen. et sp. nov.	Pérez-Moreno, Salgado, Carballido, Otero, & Pol
2022	Patagopelta cristata gen. et sp. nov.	Riguetti, Pereda-Superbiola, Ponce, Salgado, Apesteguía, Rozadilla, & Arbour
2020	Punatitan coughlini gen. et sp. nov.	Hechenleitner, Leuzinger, Martinelli, Rocher, Fiorelli, Taborda, & Salgado
2020	Bravasaurus arrierosorum gen. et sp. nov.	Hechenleitner, Leuzinger, Martinelli, Rocher, Fiorelli, Taborda, & Salgado
2019	Kaijutitan maui gen. et sp. nov.	Filippi, Salgado, & Garrido
2019	Kookne yeutensis gen. et sp. nov.	Novas, Agnolin, Rozadilla, Aranciaga-Rolando, Brisson-Egli, Motta, Cerroni, Ezcurra, Martinelli, D'Angelo, Alvarez-Herrera, Gentil, Bogan, Chimento, García-Marsà, Lo Coco, Miquel, Brito, Vera, Perez Loinaze, Fernández, & Salgado
2019	Nullotitan glaciaris gen. et sp. nov.	Novas, Agnolin, Rozadilla, Aranciaga-Rolando, Brisson-Egli, Motta, Cerroni, Ezcurra, Martinelli, D'Angelo, Alvarez-Herrera, Gentil, Bogan, Chimento, García-Marsà, Lo Coco, Miquel, Brito, Vera, Perez Loinaze, Fernández, & Salgado
2019	Isasicursor santacrucensis gen. et sp. nov.	Novas, Agnolin, Rozadilla, Aranciaga-Rolando, Brisson-Egli, Motta, Cerroni, Ezcurra, Martinelli, D'Angelo, Alvarez-Herrera, Gentil, Bogan, Chimento, García-Marsà, Lo Coco, Miquel, Brito, Vera, Perez Loinaze, Fernández, & Salgado
2018	Lavocatisaurus agrioensis gen. et sp. nov.	Canudo, Carballido, Garrido, & Salgado
2017	Isaberrysaura mollensis gen. et sp. nov.	Salgado, Canudo, Garrido, Moreno-Azanza, Martínez, Coria, & Gasca
2017	Choconsaurus baileywillisi gen. et sp. nov.	Simón, Salgado, & Calvo
2017	Triunfosaurus leonardii gen. et sp. nov.	Carvalho, Salgado, Lindoso, De Araújo-Júnior, Nogueira, & Soares
2017	Patagotitan mayorum gen. et sp. nov.	Carballido, Pol, Otero, Cerda, Salgado, Garrido, Ramezani, Cúneo, & Krause
2015	Chilesaurus diegosuarezi gen. et sp. nov.	Novas, Salgado, Suárez, Agnolín, Ezcurra, Chimento, De la Cruz, Isasi, Vargas, & Rubilar-Rogers
2015	Vegasaurus molyi gen. et sp. nov.	O'Gorman, Salgado, Olivero, & Marenssi
2013	Katepensaurus goicoecheai gen. et sp. nov.	Ibiricu, Casal, Martínez, Lamanna, Luna, & Salgado
2012	Comahuesaurus windhauseni gen. et sp. nov.	Carballido, Salgado, Pol, Canudo, & Garrido
2011	Demandasaurus darwini gen. et sp. nov.	Fernández-Baldor, Canudo, Huerta, Montero, Superbiola, & Salgado
2009	Barrosasaurus casamiquelai gen. et sp. nov.	Salgado & Coria
2008	Uberabatitan ribeiroi gen. et sp. nov.	Salgado & Carvalho
2006	Zapalasaurus bonapartei gen. et sp. nov.	Salgado, Carvalho, & Garrido
2003	Amazonsaurus maranhensis gen. et sp. nov.	Carvalho, Avilla, & Salgado
2000	Rocasaurus muniozi gen. et sp. nov.	Salgado & Azpilicueta
1996	Pellegrinisaurus powelli gen. et sp. nov.	Salgado
1996	Gasparinisaura cincosaltensis gen. et sp. nov.	Coria & Salgado
1995	Giganotosaurus carolinii gen. et sp. nov.	Coria & Salgado
1991	Amargasaurus cazaui gen. et sp. nov.	Salgado & Bonaparte
