= D. darwini =

D. darwini may refer to:

- Dagbertus darwini
- Delphacodes darwini
- Diplocynodon darwini, an extinct species of alligatoroid
- Demandasaurus darwini, the type species of a genus of rebbachisaurid sauropods which lived during the early Cretaceous

== See also ==
- Darwini (disambiguation)
