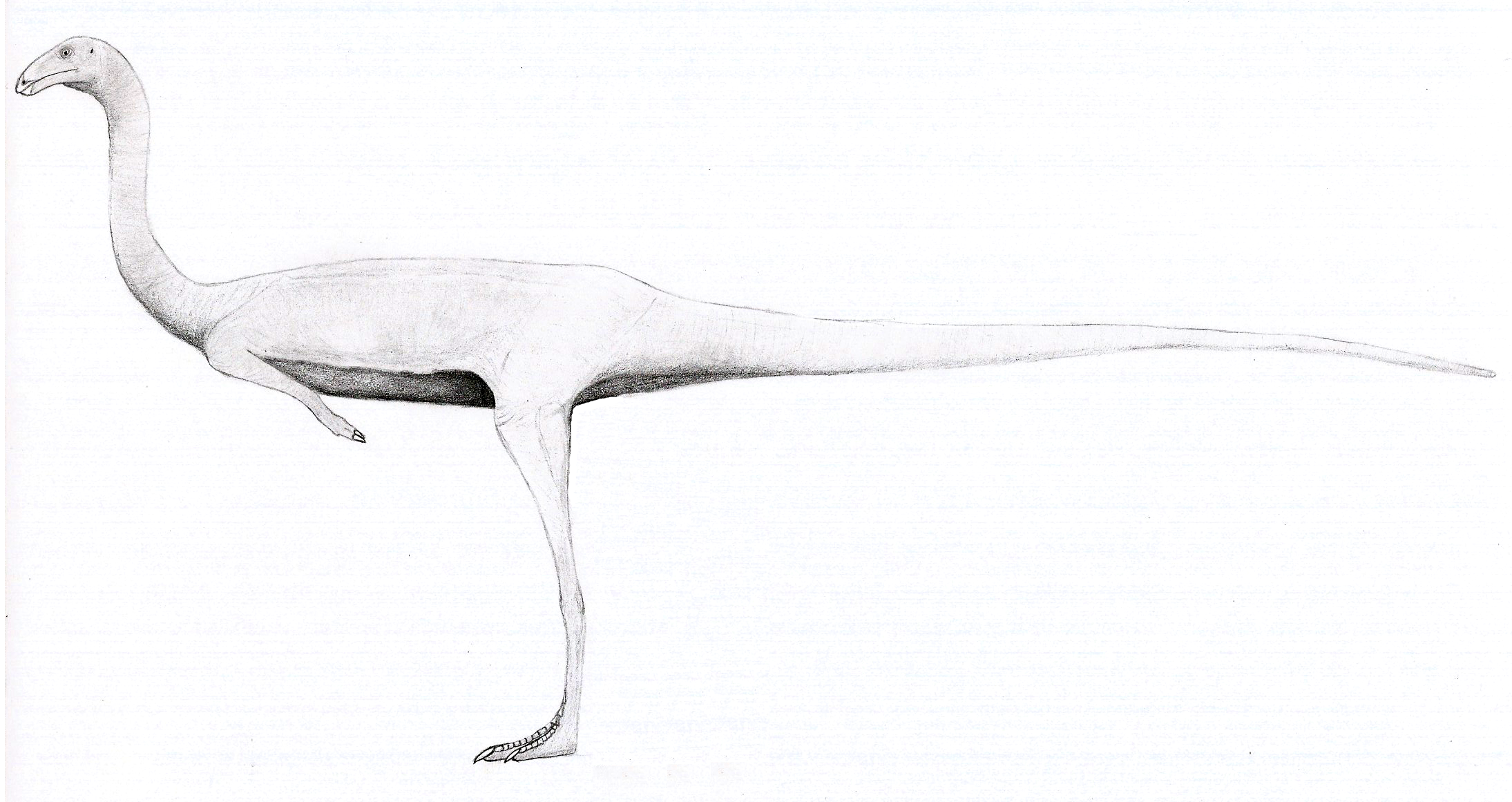
- Speculative life restoration

Scientific classification
- Kingdom: Animalia
- Phylum: Chordata
- Class: Reptilia
- Clade: Dinosauria
- Clade: Saurischia
- Clade: Theropoda
- Family: †Noasauridae
- Subfamily: †Elaphrosaurinae
- Genus: †Huinculsaurus; Baiano, Coria, & Cau, 2020

Type species
- †Huinculsaurus montesi Baiano, Coria, & Cau, 2020

= Huinculsaurus =

Huinculsaurus Temporal range: Early Cretaceous (Albian), 106.2 Ma

Genus of noasaurid dinosaurs

Huinculsaurus is an extinct genus of noasaurid dinosaurs known from the Early Cretaceous Huincul Formation of Argentina. The genus contains a single species, Huinculsaurus montesi, known from five partial vertebrae.

== Discovery and naming ==
Size compared to a human

The only known fossils of Huinculsaurus was discovered around 1991 in the Huincul Formation, about 10 metres (33 ft) away from where the Ilokelesia holotype was discovered in the Argentine Province of Neuquén. The vertebrae were mechanically separated during preparation before being formally published in 2020.

The genus was named for the Huincul Formation, where it was found, coupled with the latinized Greek suffix "saurus", meaning "lizard". The species epithet was given in honor of Eduardo Montes, a technician and fossil preparator at the Carmen Funes Museum, who helped prepare the specimen and died shortly before its official publication.

== Description ==
The holotype of Huinculsaurus, given the specimen number MCF-PVPH-36, consists of three thoracic and two sacral vertebrae. It is believed to have been an immature individual because the centra are not fully fused to the neural arches. Researchers have estimated that in life, it was around 3.42 metres (11.2 ft) long.

Huinculsaurus is distinguished from all other theropods by several autapomorphic features of the vertebrae including elongated articular facets on the prezygapophyses, pneumatic foramina on the underside of the dorsal vertebrae, and an accessory lamina on the dorsal neural arches.

== Classification ==
In their description of Huinculsaurus, Mattia Baiano and colleagues conducted a phylogenetic analysis using two datasets independently developed by previous authors. In both analyses, Huinculsaurus was found to be a close relative of the Late Jurassic theropod Elaphrosaurus, which lived more than 60 million years earlier. The authors noted that this relationship is tenuous due to the fragmentary nature of the fossils of Huinculsaurus. They remarked that the vertebrae of Huinculsaurus share many similarities with Noasauridae as well as Abelisauridae, which make its precise classification difficult. In their second analysis, they recovered Noasauridae as paraphyletic, which may explain some of the mosaic features of the vertebrae. However, the relative lack of available fossils from small ceratosaurs makes their hypotheses about its evolutionary relationships very preliminary. Abbreviated versions of both analyses conducted by Baiano and colleagues are shown below.

Dataset of Wang et al. (2017)

- Ceratosauria
  - "Dilophosaurus" sinensis
  - - - Berberosaurus
      - - Ceratosauridae
        - Abelisauridae
    - Noasauridae
      - Spinostropheus
      - - Elaphrosaurinae
          - Limusaurus
          - - Elaphrosaurus
            - Huinculsaurus
        - - Deltadromeus
          - Noasaurinae

Dataset of Dal Sasso et al. (2018)

- Ceratosauria
  - Saltriovenator
  - - Ceratosauridae
    - - Eoabelisaurus
      - - "Elaphrosaurines"
          - Elaphrosaurus
          - Huinculsaurus
        - - Austrocheirus
          - - Limusaurus
            - - - Masiakasaurus
                - Noasaurus
              - Abelisauridae

== Paleoecology ==
=== Paleoenvironment ===
Huinculsaurus was discovered Huincul Formation, a subdivision of the Neuquén Group. This unit is located in the Neuquén Basin in Patagonia. The Huincul Formation is composed of yellowish and greenish sandstones of fine-to-medium grain, some of which are tuffaceous. These deposits were laid down during the Lower Cretaceous. Earlier findings suggested a Cenomanian–Turonian age, or possibly an Early Turonian to Late Santonian age. The deposits represent the drainage system of a braided river.

The Huincul Formation is thought to represent an arid environment with ephemeral or seasonal streams. In some areas, it is up to 250 metres (820 ft) thick. It is mainly composed of green and yellow sandstones and can easily be differentiated from the overlying Lisandro Formation, which is red in color. The Candeleros Formation, underlying the Huincul, is composed of darker sediments, making all three formations easily distinguishable.

Fossilised pollen indicates a wide variety of plants were present in the Huincul Formation. A study of the El Zampal section of the formation found hornworts, liverworts, ferns, conifers, and some angiosperms (flowering plants).

=== Contemporary fauna ===
Size comparison of some of the fauna of the Huincul Formation

The Huincul Formation is among the richest Patagonian vertebrate associations, preserving fish including lungfish and gar, chelid turtles, squamates, sphenodonts, neosuchian crocodilians, and a wide variety of dinosaurs. Vertebrates are most commonly found in the lower, and therefore older, part of the formation.

Huinculsaurus is known to have coexisted with the abelisaurid Ilokelesia, which was found at the same locality. Many non-avian dinosaurs are known from the Huincul Formation, although it is not known with confidence if all of them directly coexisted with Huinculsaurus. Sauropods are represented by the titanosaurs Bustingorrytitan, Choconsaurus, Chucarosaurus, and Argentinosaurus as well as the rebbachisaurids Astigmasaura, Cathartesaura, Cienciargentina, and Sidersaura. Theropods are also diverse and include the abelisaurids Tralkasaurus and Skorpiovenator, the carcharodontosaurids Mapusaurus, Meraxes, and Taurovenator, the paravian Overoraptor, and the enigmatic theropods Aoniraptor and Gualicho. The elasmarian ornithopod Chakisaurus is the only ornithischian dinosaur named from the formation.
