= Ligabuesaurus =

Ligabuesaurus Temporal range: Late Aptian-Early Albian ~112–109 Ma

Scientific classification
- Kingdom: Animalia
- Phylum: Chordata
- Class: Reptilia
- Clade: Dinosauria
- Clade: Saurischia
- Clade: †Sauropodomorpha
- Clade: †Sauropoda
- Clade: †Macronaria
- Clade: †Somphospondyli
- Genus: †Ligabuesaurus; Bonaparte et al., 2006

Type species
- Ligabuesaurus leanzai Bonaparte et al., 2006

Extinct genus of dinosaurs

Ligabuesaurus is a genus of somphospondylan sauropod from the Early Cretaceous Lohan Cura Formation of what is now Argentina. The type species, Ligabuesaurus leanzai, was described in 2006, based on a partial skeleton with a skull. The generic name, Ligabuesaurus, honors Giancarlo Ligabue, while the specific name, leanzai, honors the geologist Dr. Héctor A. Leanza, who discovered the skeleton in the Lohan Cura Formation.

== Discovery and naming ==
The prominent Argentine paleontologist José F. Bonaparte led expeditions throughout northwestern Patagonia during the late 1990s and early 2000s. One of these expeditions, in 1997, examined a site called Cerro de los Leones, which is 10 km (6.2 mi) to the West of Picún Leufú. This locality is part of the Cullín Grande Member of the Lohan Cura formation. This expedition led to the excavation of the enigmatic and controversial sauropod genus Agustinia. Additional remains of sauropods were found at a nearby quarry by the geologist Dr. Héctor Leanza and were collected between 1998 and 2000. One of these additional skeletons would eventually be prepared and stored at the Bernardino Rivadavia Natural Sciences Argentine Museum in Buenos Aires.

These additional remains, which included the specimen MCF-PHV-233, would eventually be described and named in 2006 by José Bonaparte, Bernardo González Riga, and Sebastián Apesteguía. MCF-PHV-233 was made the holotype of the new species Ligabuesaurus leanzai. In 2014, the remains were returned to the Carmen Funes Museum in Plaza Huincul, where they were originally reposited after their excavation but before preparation. In 2022, a second skeleton was referred, specimen MCF-PHV-228. A third skeleton was recovered from the same locality, but it was not referred to Ligabuesaurus due to a lack of overlapping material.

== Description ==
Jose Bonaparte and colleagues described Ligabuesaurus as a large sauropod, although they did not provide any specific estimates of its full size in the description itself. The femur of the holotype is 166 cm (5.45 ft) long and the humerus is slightly shorter at 149 cm (4.89 ft). Gregory S. Paul suggested a full size of 18 m (59 ft) long and 20 tons. Rubén Molina-Pérez and Asier Larramendi suggested a similar estimate of 18.7 m (61 ft) long, 4.4 m (14 ft) tall at the shoulder, and a smaller mass of only 14.5 tons In their full osteology of Ligabuesaurus in 2022, Flavio Bellardini and colleagues estimated its mass as being between 17 and 29 tons based on the circumference of the femur and humerus.

The holotype of Ligabuesaurus, MCF-PHV-233, consists of a partial maxillary bone with ten associated teeth, six cervical and dorsal vertebrae, parts of a few ribs, both scapulae, the left humerus, parts of the right humerus, four left metacarpals, and most of the right hindlimb including an incomplete femur, tibia, fibula, astragalus, five metatarsals, and several associated pedal phalanges. From these remains, Bonaparte and colleagues were able to differentiate Ligabuesaurus from all other sauropods based on several characteristics of the vertebrae including the presence of anteroposteriorly narrow neural spines, relatively short pedicels on the neural arches, and the presence of unique laminae on the posterior cervical vertebrae. The full osteology, published in 2022, provided a revised diagnosis, which included several of the same autapomorphies with additional details from referred specimens.

In 2022, the holotype relceived a full osteological description by a team of authors including Flavio Bellardini, Rodolfo Coria, Diego Pino, Guillermo Windholz, Mattia Baiano, and Augustin Martinelli. They referred additional specimens from the same locality to Ligabuesaurus. These included MCF-PVPH-261, which consists of several vertebrae from the neck and upper back, both coracoids, most of the hips, and several leg bones. More fragmentary specimens referred to the genus included MCF-PVPH-228 (several vertebrae, a scapula and some ribs), MCF-PVPH-908 (a single dorsal vertebra), and MCF-PVPH-744 (a single tooth). Although these elements were found relatively far apart from one another, the lack of repeated elements led Bellardini and colleagues to suggest that all specimens were from a single individual. The physical separation of the remains and any distortions in the shape and size of symmetrical elements were the result of taphonomy.

== Classification ==
In their original description of Ligabuesaurus, Bonaparte and colleagues assigned it to the Titanosauria, but did not conduct a thorough examination of its relationships with the other members of Titanosauria. The interrelationships of titanosaurs and their close relatives have been a subject of considerable academic debate, partially due to the fragmentary nature of many titanosaur specimens. Subsequent analyses have recovered Ligabuesaurus as a non-titanosaur member of Somphospondyli. Philip Mannion and colleagues conducted a comprehensive analysis of all known members of Titanosauriformes. This analysis recovered Ligabuesaurus as being a close relative of Andesaurus, which, per the definition of Titanosauria (the least-inclusive clade containing both Andesaurus and Saltasaurus), would make Ligabuesaurus and its close relatives true titanosaurs. In their osteology of Ligabuesaurus published in 2022, Flavio Bellardini and colleagues recovered the genus once again as a non-titanosaurian somphospondylian.

Mannion et al., 2013

- Somphospondyli
  - Andesauroidea
    - - Angolatitan
      - - Chubutisaurus
        - - Baotianmansaurus
          - Cloverly titanosauriform
          - Huanghetitan liujiaxiaensis
          - Wintonotitan
    - - Haestasaurus
      - - - Paluxysaurus
          - Sauroposeidon
        - - Ruyangosaurus
          - - Tastavinsaurus
            - - Andesaurus
              - Ligabuesaurus
  - Titanosauroidea

Bellardini et al., 2022

- Somphospondyli
  - Euhelopodidae
    - Ruyangosaurus
    - - Euhelopus
      - - Erketu
        - - Phuwiangosaurus
          - Qiaowanlong
  - - Sauroposeidon
    - - Ligabuesaurus
      - - Huabeisaurus
        - Wintonotitan
        - - - Daxiatitan
            - Xianshanosaurus
          - Titanosauria

== Paleoenvironment ==
The Lohan Cura Formation, where all remains of Ligabuesaurus were found, is composed mainly of siltstones and sandstones, which means the environment was likely heavily irrigated by rivers. This is further supported by the prevalence of a variety of turtle fossils. Remains from other sauropods are also common including the rebbachisaurids Limaysaurus and Comahuesaurus, and the enigmatic genus Agustinia. Pterosaur teeth belonging to ornithocheiromorphs have also been found here.

== See also ==
- 2006 in paleontology
- List of sauropod species
- List of sauropodomorph type specimens
