= Zapalasaurus =

Zapalasaurus Temporal range: Barremian-Early Aptian ~130–120 Ma

Scientific classification
- Kingdom: Animalia
- Phylum: Chordata
- Class: Reptilia
- Clade: Dinosauria
- Clade: Saurischia
- Clade: †Sauropodomorpha
- Clade: †Sauropoda
- Superfamily: †Diplodocoidea
- Family: †Rebbachisauridae
- Genus: †Zapalasaurus; Salgado et al., 2006

Type species
- Zapalasaurus bonapartei Salgado et al., 2006

Extinct genus of dinosaurs

Zapalasaurus is an extinct genus of sauropod dinosaur from the Early Cretaceous-aged La Amarga Formation of what is today Patagonia. The type and only species is Z. bonapartei.

== Discovery and naming ==
The fossils which would eventually be named Zapalasaurus were discovered in 1995 at a locality called Puesto Morales. This corresponds to the Piedra Parada Member of the La Amarga Formation. The specimen was excavated from 1995-1996 by scientists associated with the Bernardino Rivadavia Natural Sciences Argentine Museum and the Juan A. Olsacher Museum under the leadership of the famous Argentine paleontologist José F. Bonaparte. Additional remains of this specimen were later excavated in 2004 by the Geology and Paleontology Museum of the National University of Comahue. The specimen was given the designation Pv-6127-MOZ. It was described and named in 2006 by a team of scientists led by Leonardo Salgado. Zapalasaurus was named after the city of Zapala, which is approximately 80 kilometres (50 mi) away from where the holotype was discovered. The species epithet was given in honor of Dr. José Bonaparte, who was an important Argentine paleontologist in the 20th century.

== Description ==
The holotype of Zapalasaurus consists of a single vertebrae from the middle of the neck, a fragment of a sacral vertebra, 17 caudal vertebrae, the left ischium and pubis, a fragment of an ilium, a partial left femur, and the left tibia. Zapalasaurus can be distinguished from other diplodocoids based on several features of the cervical neural arches as well as caudal vertebrae which double in length from front to back.

Zapalasaurus is assumed to have a long neck which would have been developed for feeding adaption, allowing its neck to swing in an arc like shape. This would allow Zapalasaurus to browse a wide variety of plants and greens without having to walk very far.

== Classification ==
In their original description, Salgado and colleagues found Zapalasaurus to be a basally-branching diplodocoid outside of any of the major subgroups. However, subsequent analyses have found it to be a member of Rebbachisauridae. A cladogram published by Carballido and colleagues in their description of Comahuesaurus is shown below.

- Rebbachisauridae
  - Amazonsaurus
  - - Histriasaurus
    - Zapalasaurus
    - - Comahuesaurus
      - - Nigersaurinae
          - Demandasaurus
          - Nigersaurus
        - Limaysaurinae
          - Rayososaurus
          - Rebbachisaurus
          - - Cathartesaura
            - Limaysaurus

== Paleoenvironment ==
Zapalasaurus was discovered in sedimentary rocks of the La Amarga Formation, which is part of the Neuquén Basin and dates to the Barremian and late Aptian of the Early Cretaceous. Most vertebrate fossils, including Zapalasaurus, have been found in the lowermost (oldest) part of the formation, the Puesto Antigual Member. This member is approximately 29 meters (95 ft) in thickness and mainly composed of sandstones deposited by braided rivers. The sauropod fauna of the La Amarga Formation was diverse and included the dicraeosaurids Amargasaurus and Amargatitanis, and unnamed remains of basal titanosauriforms. The high diversity suggests that different sauropod species exploited different food sources in order to reduce competition. Basal titanosauriforms showed proportionally longer necks, longer forelimbs, and broader tooth crowns than dicraeosaurids and rebbachisaurids, suggesting greater feeding heights. Amargatitanis and Amargasaurus probably fed above ground level at heights of up to 2.7 meters (8.9 ft), as evidenced by the anatomy of their neck and inner ear. Rebbachisaurids like Zapalasaurus presumably fed at ground-level, while basal Titanosauriforms exploited food sources at higher levels.

Other dinosaurs of the La Amarga Formation include an indeterminate stegosaur; predatory dinosaurs include the small ceratosaur Ligabueino, and the presence of a large tetanuran is indicated by teeth. Other than dinosaurs, the formation is notable for the cladotherian mammal Vincelestes, the only mammal known from the Early Cretaceous of South America. Crocodylomorphs are represented by the trematochampsid Amargasuchus.

== See also ==
- 2006 in paleontology
- List of sauropod species
- List of sauropodomorph type specimens
