= Comahuesaurus =

Comahuesaurus Temporal range: Aptian-Albian ~117–100 Ma
- Skeletal reconstruction of C. windhauseni based on several specimens including the holotype

Scientific classification
- Kingdom: Animalia
- Phylum: Chordata
- Class: Reptilia
- Clade: Dinosauria
- Clade: Saurischia
- Clade: †Sauropodomorpha
- Clade: †Sauropoda
- Superfamily: †Diplodocoidea
- Family: †Rebbachisauridae
- Genus: †Comahuesaurus; Carballido et al. 2012

Type species
- Comahuesaurus windhauseni Carballido et al. 2012

Extinct genus of dinosaurs

Comahuesaurus (meaning "Comahue lizard", after the region in which it was found) is a genus of sauropod dinosaur of the family Rebbachisauridae. It was found in the Lohan Cura Formation in Argentina, and lived during the Early Cretaceous (Aptian to Albian). The type species is C. windhauseni, named for Anselmo Windhausen, who contributed significantly to the geological study of Patagonia.

== Discovery and naming ==
The holotype of Comahuesaurus, given the specimen number MOZ-PV 6722, was discovered on the northern slope of a locality called Cerro Aguada del Leon in the south-central area of the Neuquén Basin, which corresponds to the Lohan Cura Formation. It was originally assigned to Limaysaurus sp. by Leonardo Salgado and colleagues in 2004. Despite being referred to an existing genus, the authors remarked that there were significant enough anatomical differences to justify the possible naming of a new species. The discovery and preparation of additional specimens from the same bone bed as the holotype led a team of authors, including José Luis Carballidoa, Leonardo Salgadob, Diego Pola, José Ignacio Canudod, and Alberto Garridoe, to describe the new material and create the new genus Comahuesaurus to contain these remains.

== Description ==
The holotype of Comahuesaurus, MOZ-PV 6722, consists only of a single neural arch from a vertebra of the lower-back. However, abundant additional material was discovered from the same bone bed, and the anatomy of these additional bones were used to diagnose the new species. The authors concluded they all belonged to a single taxon, but since the exact number of individuals preserved is not known, the holotype was restricted to the single bone originally reported by Salgado.

Comahuesaurus is known from abundant material compared to other rebbachisaurids. Bones from at least three individuals were excavated from the type locality and they include: 37 caudal vertebrae, three partial dorsal vertebrae, part of a sternum, a coracoid, a complete right humerus, part of an ilium, a complete pubis bone, five ischia, two left and three right femora, part of a tibia, and a left fibula. Fragmentary remains of humeri, pubes, femora were also identified. The authors did not provide a full size estimate for Comahuesaurus, but they did describe the humerus as being 67.5 cm (2.21 ft) long and the femur as being 113 cm (3.71 ft) long.

The authors of its description distinguished Comahuesaurus from all other rebbachisaurids by the following autapomorphies: a thin keel on the bottom of the dorsal vertebrae, long prezygapophyses, several distinctive laminae on the anterior dorsal vertebrae, well-developed fossae on the front caudal vertebrae, short transverse processes on the caudal vertebrae, a very robust humerus, a straight shaft of the ischium, and an unconstricted iliac peduncle.

== Classification ==
In their phylogenetic analysis, Carballido et al. (2012) placed Comahuesaurus in an intermediate position between basal rebbachisaurids such as Histriasaurus and the derived clade formed by subfamilies Rebbachisaurinae and Limaysaurinae. It shared the reduced hyposphene-hypantrum system that would characterize more derived rebbachisaurids, but hadn't yet completely lost this structure. That change would happen at some further point in the evolution of the clade, as it is so far only known to be fully absent in Limaysaurus and its close relatives. The cladogram shown in their description is shown below.

- Rebbachisauridae
  - Amazonsaurus
  - - Histriasaurus
    - Zapalasaurus
    - - Comahuesaurus
      - - Nigersaurinae
          - Demandasaurus
          - Nigersaurus
        - Limaysaurinae
          - Rayososaurus
          - Rebbachisaurus
          - - Cathartesaura
            - Limaysaurus

== Paleoenvironment ==
The bonebed which preserves all known remains of Comahuesaurus is believed to have been deposited rapidly in a single catastrophic event by an ephemeral river. This could have been a flash flood, a landslide, or some other natural disaster that buried and killed the individuals which would later be fossilized. The Lohan Cura Formation, where these remains were found, is composed mainly of siltstones and sandstones, which means the environment was likely heavily irrigated by rivers. This is further supported by the prevalence of a variety of turtle fossils. Remains from other sauropods are also common including the rebbachisaurid Limaysaurus, the macronarian Ligabuesaurus, and the enigmatic genus Agustinia. Pterosaur teeth belonging to ornithocheiromorphs have also been found here.
