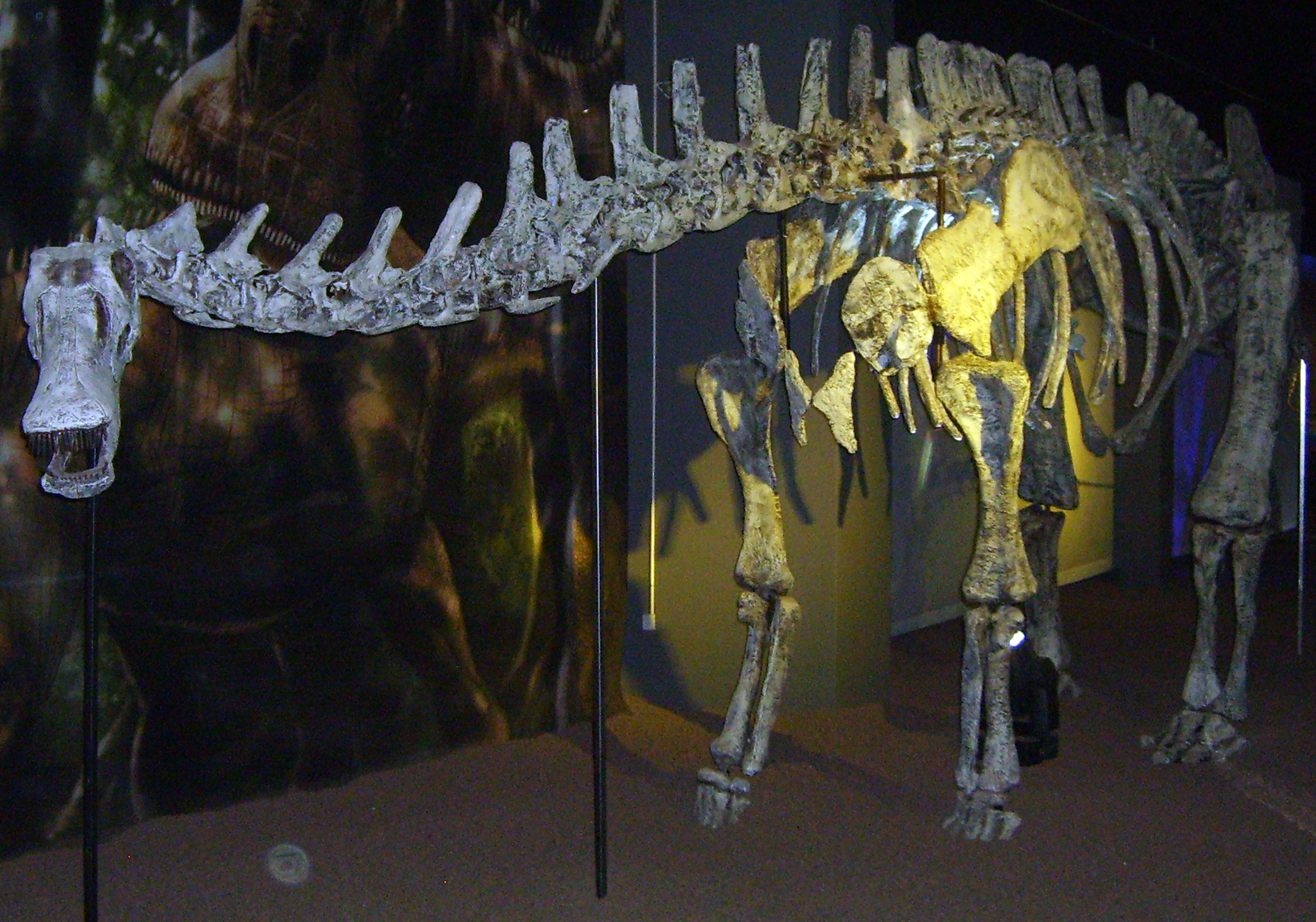
- Limaysaurus tessonei skeleton restoration

Scientific classification
- Kingdom: Animalia
- Phylum: Chordata
- Class: Reptilia
- Clade: Dinosauria
- Clade: Saurischia
- Clade: †Sauropodomorpha
- Clade: †Sauropoda
- Superfamily: †Diplodocoidea
- Clade: †Diplodocimorpha
- Family: †Rebbachisauridae; Bonaparte, 1999

Subgroups
- †Agustinia; †Amazonsaurus; †Astigmasaura; †Campananeyen; †Cienciargentina; †Comahuesaurus; †Histriasaurus; †Lavocatisaurus; †Maraapunisaurus?; †Nopcsaspondylus; †Sidersaura; †Xenoposeidon?; †Zapalasaurus; †Khebbashia; †Limaysaurinae; †Cathartesaura; †Katepensaurus; †Limaysaurus; †Rayososaurus; †Rebbachisaurinae; †Demandasaurus; †Itapeuasaurus; †Katepensaurus?; †Nigersaurus; †Rebbachisaurus; †Tataouinea

= Rebbachisauridae =

Rebbachisaurids Temporal range: Late Jurassic to Late Cretaceous, 150–90 Ma

Extinct family of dinosaurs

Rebbachisauridae is a family of sauropod dinosaurs known from fragmentary fossil remains from the Cretaceous of South America, Africa, North America, Europe and possibly Central Asia.

== Taxonomy ==
In 1990 sauropod specialist Jack McIntosh included the first known rebbachisaurid genus, the giant North African sauropod Rebbachisaurus, in the family Diplodocidae, subfamily Dicraeosaurinae, on the basis of skeletal details. With the discovery in subsequent years of a number of additional genera, it was realised that Rebbachisaurus and its relatives constituted a distinct group of dinosaurs. In 1999, the Argentine paleontologist José Bonaparte described the family Rebbachisauridae; in 2011, Whitlock defined two new subfamilies within the group: Nigersaurinae and Limaysaurinae.

Khebbashia is a clade within Rebbachisauridae. Members of Khebbashia were medium-sized sauropods from the early Cretaceous period of South America, Africa and Europe.

The name "Khebbashia" is derived from "Khebbash" or "Khebbache", a Moroccan tribe that inhabited the region where the first rebbachisaurid specimen was found in North Africa. Khebbashia is defined as the least inclusive clade including Limaysaurus tessonei, Nigersaurus taqueti, and Rebbachisaurus garasbae. It therefore includes the rebbachisaurid subfamilies Rebbachisaurinae and Limaysaurinae, to the exclusion of more basal forms.

Rebbachisaurinae is a subfamily which is within both Rebbachisauridae and Khebbashia, defined to include Rebbachisaurus garasbae and exclude Limaysaurus tessonei, which belongs to its own subfamily, Limaysaurinae. Some phylogenies however, include Rebbachisaurus in a clade with Limaysaurus, and thus the subfamily name was not used. In 2015, a phylogenetic analysis was conducted, and it found Rebbachisaurus instead to be closer to Nigersaurus and related genera than Limaysaurus, and thus was used to replace Nigersaurinae as Rebbachisaurinae is the older term and is named after the genus used for the formation of the family Rebbachisauridae. The 2015 cladogram of Fanti et al. is shown below.

- Rebbachisauridae
  - Amazonsaurus
  - - Zapalasaurus
    - Histriasaurus
    - Comahuesaurus
    - Khebbashia
      - Limaysaurinae
        - Cathartesaura
        - Limaysaurus
      - Rebbachisaurinae
        - Katepensaurus
        - - Nigersaurus
          - - Rebbachisaurus
            - Demandasaurus
            - Tataouinea

== Evolutionary relationships and characteristics ==
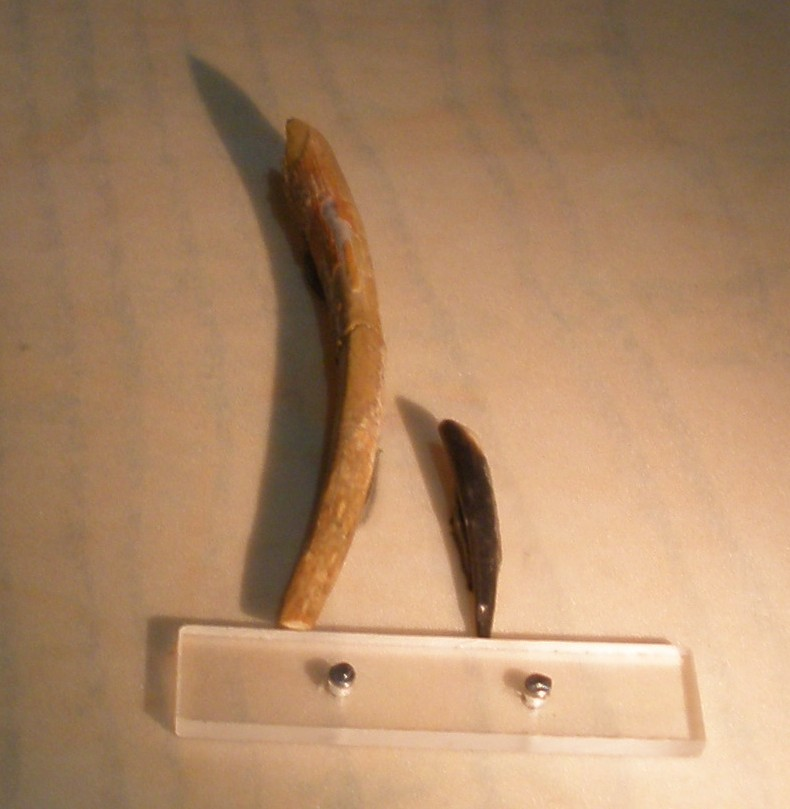
Nigersaurus taqueti teeth

Although all authorities agree that the rebbachisaurids are members of the superfamily Diplodocoidea, they lack the bifid (divided) cervical neural spines that characterise the diplodocids and dicraeosaurids, and for this reason are considered more primitive than the latter two groups. It is not yet known whether they share the distinctive whip-tail of the latter two taxa.

Rebbachisaurids are distinguished from other sauropods by their distinctive teeth, which have low angle, internal wear facets and asymmetrical enamel.

Unique among sauropods, at least some rebbachisaurids (such as Nigersaurus) are characterised by the presence of tooth batteries, similar to those of hadrosaur and ceratopsian dinosaurs. Such a feeding adaptation has thus developed independently three times among the dinosaurs.

So far, rebbachisaurids are known only from the middle and early part of the Late Cretaceous. They constitute the last known representatives of the diplodocoids, and lived alongside the titanosaurs until fairly late in the Cretaceous.
