= Itapeuasaurus =

Itapeuasaurus Temporal range: Late Cretaceous, Cenomanian
- Skeletal reconstruction of the holotype specimen (UFMA. 1.10.1960a), with unknown elements based on Demandasaurus

Scientific classification
- Domain: Eukaryota
- Kingdom: Animalia
- Phylum: Chordata
- Clade: Dinosauria
- Clade: Saurischia
- Clade: †Sauropodomorpha
- Clade: †Sauropoda
- Superfamily: †Diplodocoidea
- Family: †Rebbachisauridae
- Subfamily: †Rebbachisaurinae
- Genus: †Itapeuasaurus; Lindoso et al. 2019

Type species
- †Itapeuasaurus cajapioensis Lindoso et al. 2019

Extinct genus of dinosaurs

Itapeuasaurus (meaning "Itapeua lizard") is a genus of rebbachisaurid sauropod dinosaur from the Alcântara Formation (Itapecuru Group) of Maranhão in Brazil. The type and only species is Itapeuasaurus cajapioensis. It is the most complete Cenomanian-aged diplodocoid known from South America and it is also the first reported Cenomanian-aged rebbachisaurid discovered in South America.

== Discovery and naming ==
In November 2014, fisherman Carlos Wagner Silva discovered a fossilised humerus on the beach at Itapeua. In May 2015, paleontologist Manuel Alfredo Medeiros and his students were sent in and they secured several bones, including the holotype, UFMA. 1.10.1960a, which consists of six vertebrae, and a paratype containing around six to seven vertebrae, a humerus and a partial ischium - the largest preserved vertebra reached up to 40 centimetres (16 in). Because the location where the holotype was found is an intertidal area, excavating the holotype was very hard and could only be excavated around four hours a day during each daily tidal cycle. In 2019, the species Itapeuasaurus cajapioensis was named and described.

== Phylogeny ==
Lindoso et al., (2019) placed Itapeuasaurus in the Nigersaurinae, as the sister taxon to Demandasaurus.
