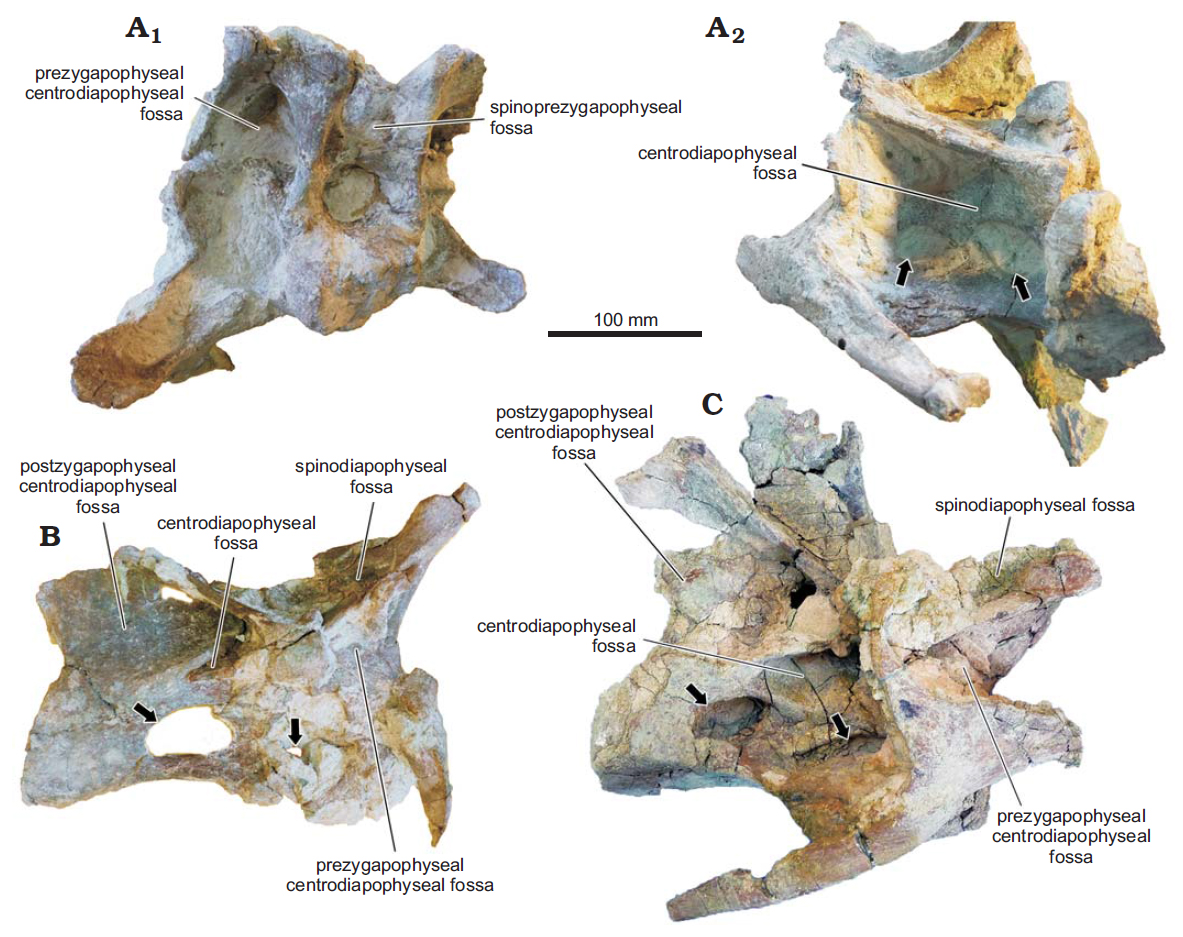
- Cervical vertebrae

Scientific classification
- Kingdom: Animalia
- Phylum: Chordata
- Class: Reptilia
- Clade: Dinosauria
- Clade: Saurischia
- Clade: †Sauropodomorpha
- Clade: †Sauropoda
- Superfamily: †Diplodocoidea
- Family: †Rebbachisauridae
- Subfamily: †Limaysaurinae
- Genus: †Katepensaurus; Ibiricu et al., 2013

Type species
- †Katepensaurus goicoecheai Ibiricu et al., 2013

= Katepensaurus =

Katepensaurus Temporal range: Late Cretaceous, Cenomanian–Turonian

Extinct genus of rebbachisaurid dinosaurs

Katepensaurus ("hole lizard") is an extinct genus of rebbachisaurid sauropod dinosaur known from the Late Cretaceous of south-central Chubut Province of central Patagonia, Argentina. It contains a single species, Katepensaurus goicoecheai.

== Fossil record ==
Skeletal restoration of the holotype

The holotype and only known specimen of Katepensaurus goicoecheai is UNPSJB-PV 1007, a partial skeleton from the Lower Member of the Bajo Barreal Formation of Chubut Province, Argentina. The specimen preserves one skull bone (a frontal), three cervical vertebrae, six dorsal vertebrae, five caudal vertebrae, and several difficult-to-identify fragments, which probably include portions of additional vertebrae as well as possible fragments of some limb bones (a metacarpal or metatarsal and an astragalus). It represents an individual that was at least seven years old and had not finished growing when it died. The Lower Member of the Bajo Barreal Formation is considered to date to the Cenomanian or Turonian age of the early Late Cretaceous. Additional rebbachisaurid specimens from the Bajo Barreal Formation have been described, including a cervical vertebra (UNPSJB-PV 1005), an isolated caudal vertebra (UNPSJB-PV 580), and a partial tail consisting of four incomplete caudal vertebrae and two chevrons (UNPSJB-PV 1004). It is possible that these specimens also belong to Katepensaurus, although the available evidence is insufficient to determine their affinities more precisely than Rebbachisauridae. Remains of a rebbachisaurid taxon distinct from Katepensaurus have been found in the Bajo Barreal Formation, and it is possible that these specimens belong to this other unnamed species.

== Discovery and naming ==
The only known specimen of Katepensaurus goicoecheai was collected from the "2005 Quarry" at Estancia Laguna Palacios, a ranch owner at which the National University of the Patagonia San Juan Bosco regularly conducted field work. In 2013, Lucio M. Ibiricu, Gabriel A. Casal, Rubén Dario Martínez, Matthew C. Lamanna, Marcelo Luna and Leonardo Salgado described this specimen as representing a new genus and species, which they named Katepensaurus goicoecheai. The generic name is derived from Tehuelche katepenk, "hole", referring to a distinctive opening in the transverse processes of the dorsal vertebrae. The specific name honours Alejandro Goicoechea, the owner of the Estancia Laguna Palacios. At the time the species was named, only three cervical vertebrae, three dorsal vertebrae, and two caudal vertebrae had been excavated and identified, but subsequent excavations conducted at the quarry uncovered additional bones from the same skeleton.

== Description ==
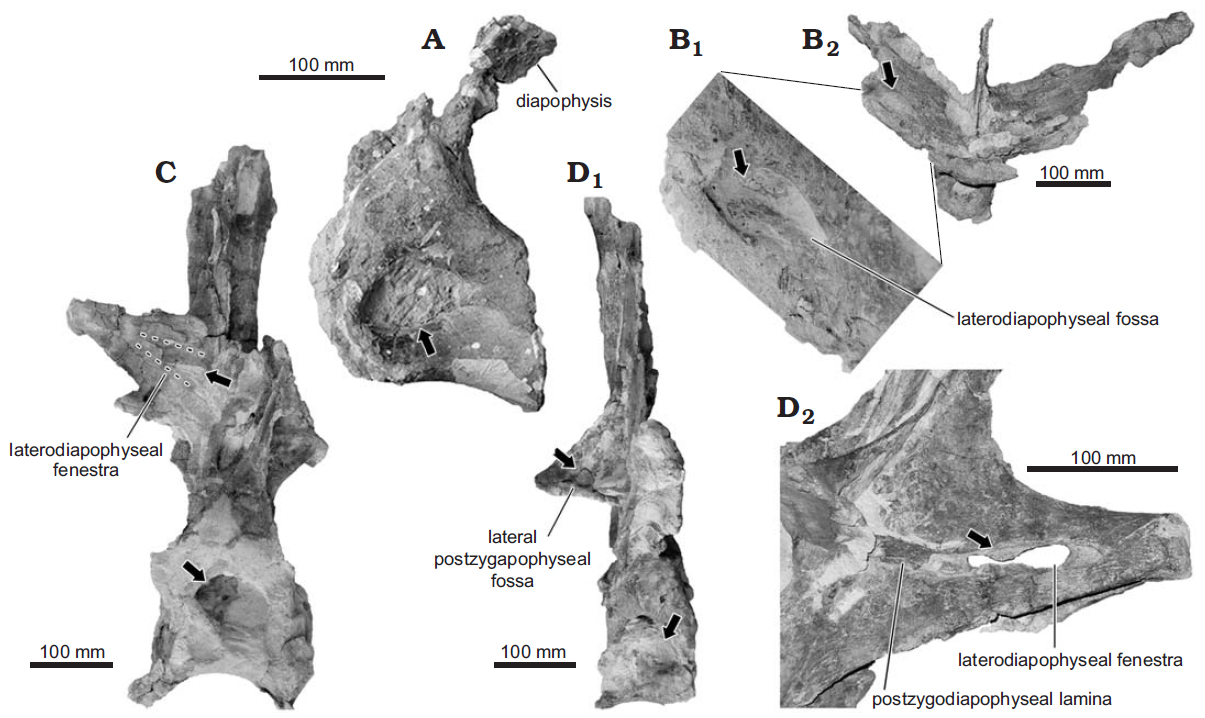
Dorsal vertebrae

Katepensaurus is distinguished from other rebbachisaurids primarily by various details of its dorsal vertebrae. As in other sauropods, the vertebrae of Katepensaurus were highly pneumatized, with openings in the bone, such as the lateral pneumatic fossae, that would have been filled by air sacs in life. In Katepensaurus, the lateral pneumatic fossae of the dorsal vertebrae were divided in two by a ridge of bone, which is an uncommon trait among sauropods not known in other rebbachisaurids but present in the more distantly related Supersaurus. Katepensaurus is unique among sauropods in exhibiting an additional set of pneumatic openings, termed laterodiapophyseal fenestrae, through which air sacs would have filled the transverse processes of the dorsal vertebrae. It is these openings that give Katepensaurus its name. The arrangement of the vertebral laminae, a complex arrangement of bony ridges that are characteristic of sauropod vertebrae, is generally similar between Katepensaurus and other rebbachisaurids. However, Katepensaurus shows a unique pair of laminae, termed the dorsal parapophyseal centrodiapophyseal fossa lamina and the ventral parapophyseal centrodiapophyseal fossa lamina, that have not been seen in any other rebbachisaurid. Other unique traits that have been documented in the dorsal vertebrae of Katepensaurus include vertical ridges on the junction between the neural arch and centrum, well-defined, rounded fossae on the lateral aspect of the postzygapophyses, and a teardrop-shaped profile of the posterior articular surface of the centrum.

== Classification ==
Katepensaurus exhibits a combination of traits characteristic of nigersaurines/rebbachisaurines (Note: Nigersaurinae may be a junior synonym of Rebbachisaurinae) and traits characteristic of limaysaurines, and its phylogenetic affinities are not certain. An analysis by Ibiricu and colleagues in 2015 recovered Katepensaurus as a limaysaurine; in contrast, analyses by Fanti and colleagues in 2015 and Canudo and colleagues in 2018 recovered Katepensaurus as the basalmost rebbachisaurine. Analyses by Mannion and colleagues in 2019 could not resolve the affinities of Katepensaurus precisely, and found differing results depending on their analysis protocol. In one of their analyses, Katepensaurus was recovered as a limaysaurine, but in the other, it was recovered outside Khebbashia, as a basal rebbachisaurid.
