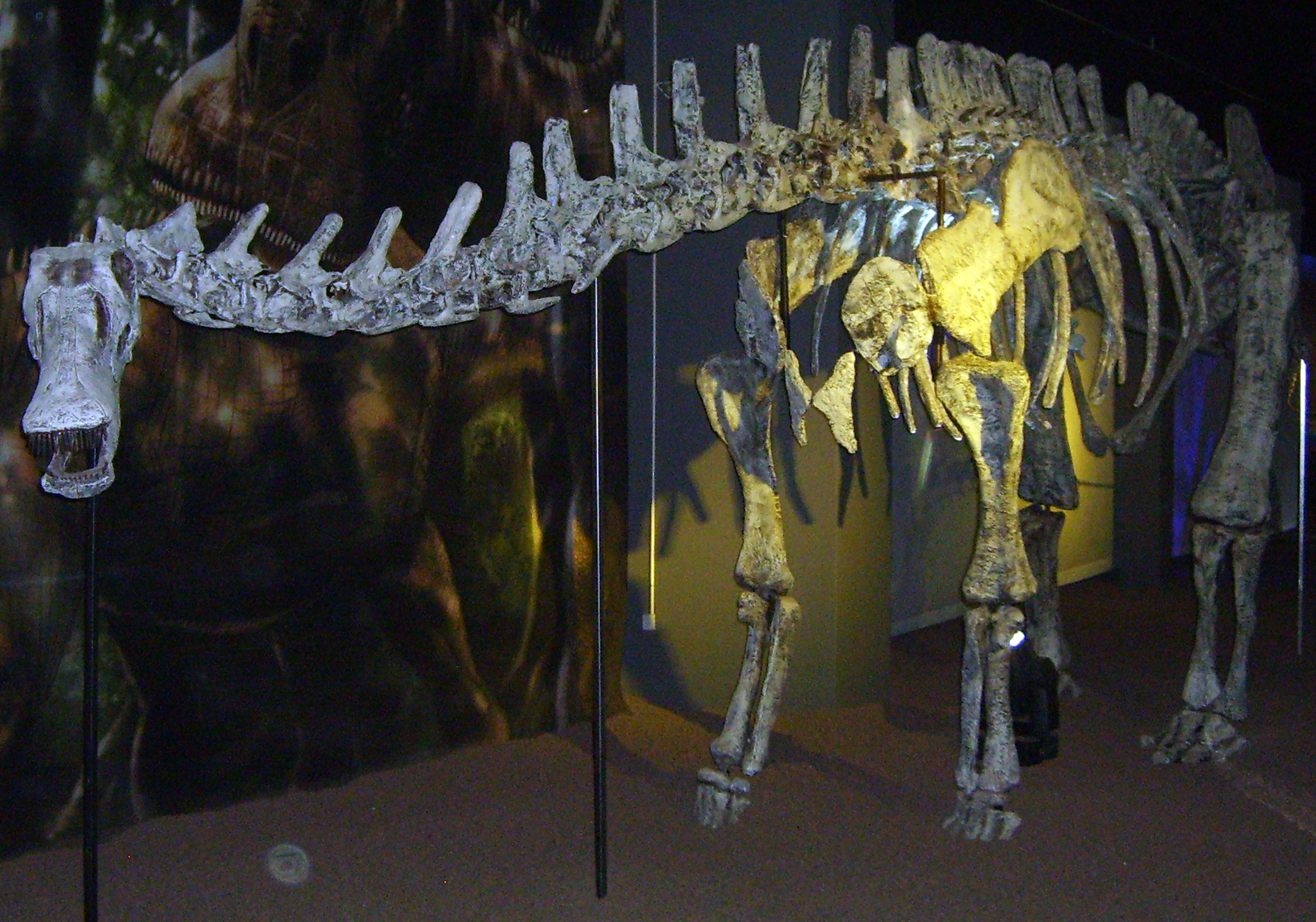
- Skeleton restoration

Scientific classification
- Kingdom: Animalia
- Phylum: Chordata
- Class: Reptilia
- Clade: Dinosauria
- Clade: Saurischia
- Clade: †Sauropodomorpha
- Clade: †Sauropoda
- Superfamily: †Diplodocoidea
- Family: †Rebbachisauridae
- Subfamily: †Limaysaurinae
- Genus: †Limaysaurus; Salgado et al., 2004

Type species
- †Limaysaurus tessonei Salgado et al., 2004 (Calvo & Salgado, 1995)

Synonyms
- Rebbachisaurus tessonei Calvo & Salgado, 1995

= Limaysaurus =

Limaysaurus Temporal range: Albian, ~111–106 Ma

Extinct genus of dinosaurs

Limaysaurus ("Limay lizard") is a genus of rebbachisaurid sauropod dinosaurs which lived during the Early Cretaceous (Albian) in what is now South America (northwestern Patagonia). It is represented by a single species, L. tessonei.

== Discovery ==
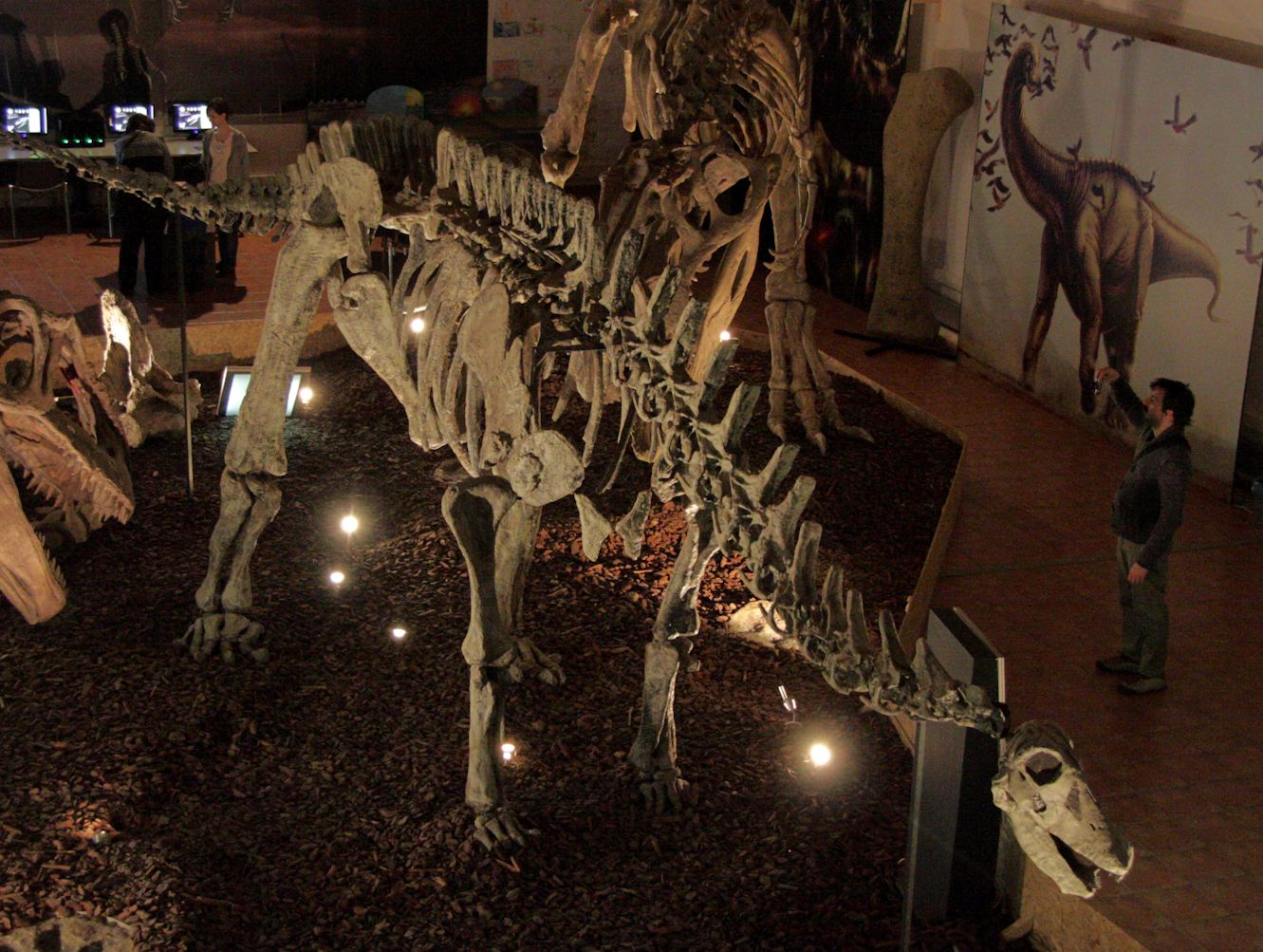
Skeleton viewed from above, National Technical University of Athens, Greece

Limaysaurus includes a single type species, Limaysaurus tessonei, which was originally referred to the genus Rebbachisaurus as Rebbachisaurus tessonei, an African species, by Jorge Calvo and Leonardo Salgado in 1995. However, a generic separation was proposed by Salgado, Alberto Garrido, Sergio Cocca and Juan Cocca, and the genus Limaysaurus was named in 2004. The generic name is derived from Río Limay which borders the region and from the specific name, tessonei, in honor of Lieto Tessone, who found the first and most complete holotype. Their discovery shed some light on the distribution of Gondwanan dinosaurs in the mid-Cretaceous period. Several specimens of Limaysaurus are known, one of which (the holotype) is 80% complete, being one of the most complete Cretaceous sauropods ever found in South America.

The holotype specimen, MUCPv-205, a partial skeleton including the back of the skull, was found in 1988 by Lieto Francisco Tessone, who is honoured in the specific name. It was afterwards collected, together with MUCPv-206, a second fragmentary skeleton, by José Bonaparte. These two adult specimens likely hailed from the top of the Candeleros Formation. An additional smaller specimen, MUCPv-153, was found nearby, although it belonged to the base of the Huincul Formation. Originally suggested to be the Cenomanian age of the Late Cretaceous, the maximum depositional age of both the Candeleros Formation and the overlying Huincul Formation is re-dated to the early Albian by Maniel et al. (2026), approximately 111.4 ± 1.1 Ma and 106.2 ± 1.0 Ma respectively.

Limaysaurus was found 15 km (9.3 mi) southwest of Villa El Chocón, Picún Leufú Department, Neuquén Province, Patagonia, Argentina. The sediments belong to the Río Limay Subgroup, in Lohan Cura Formation, at Cerro Aguada del León. These beds appear to date from the Aptian-Albian interval, although these fossils were later named Comahuesaurus.

== Description ==
Skeletal reconstructions of the three known specimens

Limaysaurus was a medium-sized sauropod. Gregory S. Paul in 2010 estimated its length at fifteen meters (49 feet) and its weight at seven tonnes. The neural spines on its back were very tall. The neural spines of the cervical and dorsal vertebrae are not V-shaped but they have a simple and straight form like an I. Its teeth were curved, unlike those of Diplodocus which were pencil-shaped. Another distinct characteristic of this sauropod is its phylogenetic relationship to Rebbachisaurus from Morocco. This discovery supports the theory that there was a land bridge connecting South America to Africa 100 million years ago. It shared its habitat with Andesaurus and Giganotosaurus, characterized by plains with large and shallow lagoons. The climate was mild and humid. In fossil remains of Limaysaurus, gastroliths have been found, which were used to help the stomach to grind food.

== Classification ==
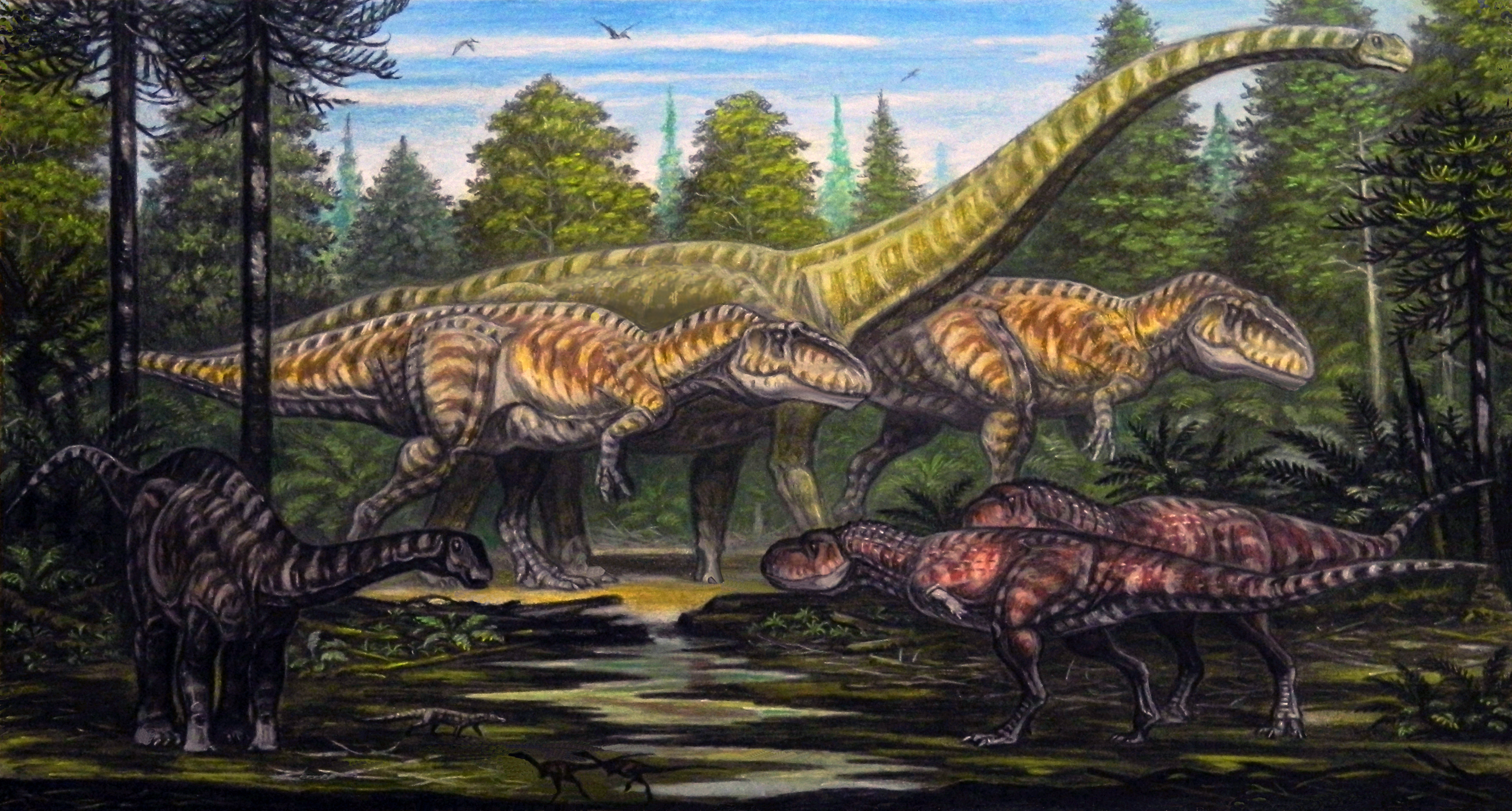
Restoration of Limaysaurus (front left) with contemporary dinosaurs

The describing authors in 2004 assigned Limaysaurus to the family Rebbachisauridae. The rebbachisaurids are a basal clade within the Diplodocimorpha, and their remains have been found in Cretaceous-age rocks in Europe, South America, and Africa. A cladistic analysis of macronarian sauropods (Salgado et al., 2004) demonstrated close affinities between Limaysaurus, the African genera Rebbachisaurus and Nigersaurus, and the South American genera Rayososaurus and Cathartesaura.
