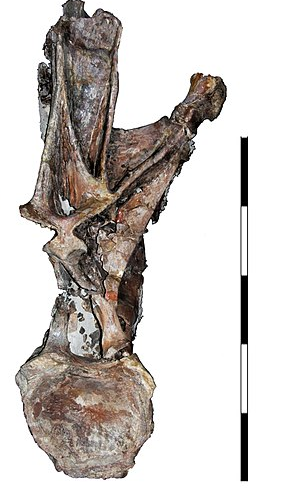
- Vertebra from the holotype

Scientific classification
- Kingdom: Animalia
- Phylum: Chordata
- Class: Reptilia
- Clade: Dinosauria
- Clade: Saurischia
- Clade: †Sauropodomorpha
- Clade: †Sauropoda
- Superfamily: †Diplodocoidea
- Family: †Rebbachisauridae
- Genus: †Histriasaurus; Dalla Vecchia, 1998

Type species
- †Histriasaurus boscarollii Dalla Vecchia, 1998

= Histriasaurus =

Histriasaurus Temporal range: Early Cretaceous, 135–125 Ma

Extinct genus of dinosaurs

Histriasaurus (HIS-tree-ah-SAWR-us) (meaning "Istria lizard") is a genus of sauropod dinosaur from the Early Cretaceous (Hauterivian to Barremian stages, around 135-125 million years ago) of Croatia. It has been suggested to be a rebbachisaurid, and if so one of the oldest known members of the group.

== Discovery and naming ==
The holotype, specimen WN V-6, was found in a bonebed in lacustrine limestone exposed on the seafloor off the coast of the town of Bale on the Istrian peninsula in Croatia by Dario Boscarolli during the 1980s, and described in 1998 by Dalla Vecchia.

The type species, H. boscarollii, was described by Dalla Vecchia in 1998. The specific name honours the discoverer of the site, Darío Boscarolli. Although some authors consider Histriasaurus a dubious taxon, more recent papers support the original classification.

== Classification ==
It was a diplodocoid sauropod, related to, but more primitive than, Rebbachisaurus. Phylogenetic analyses published in 2007 and 2011 placed Histriasaurus as the most basal member of Rebbachisauridae.

== Paleoenvironment ==
Histriasaurus would have coexisted with an indeterminate camarasaurid, an indeterminate titanosauriform, an indeterminate somphospondylian, an indeterminate theropod, an indeterminate dinosaur of unknown classification and the foraminiferan Campanellula capuensis.
