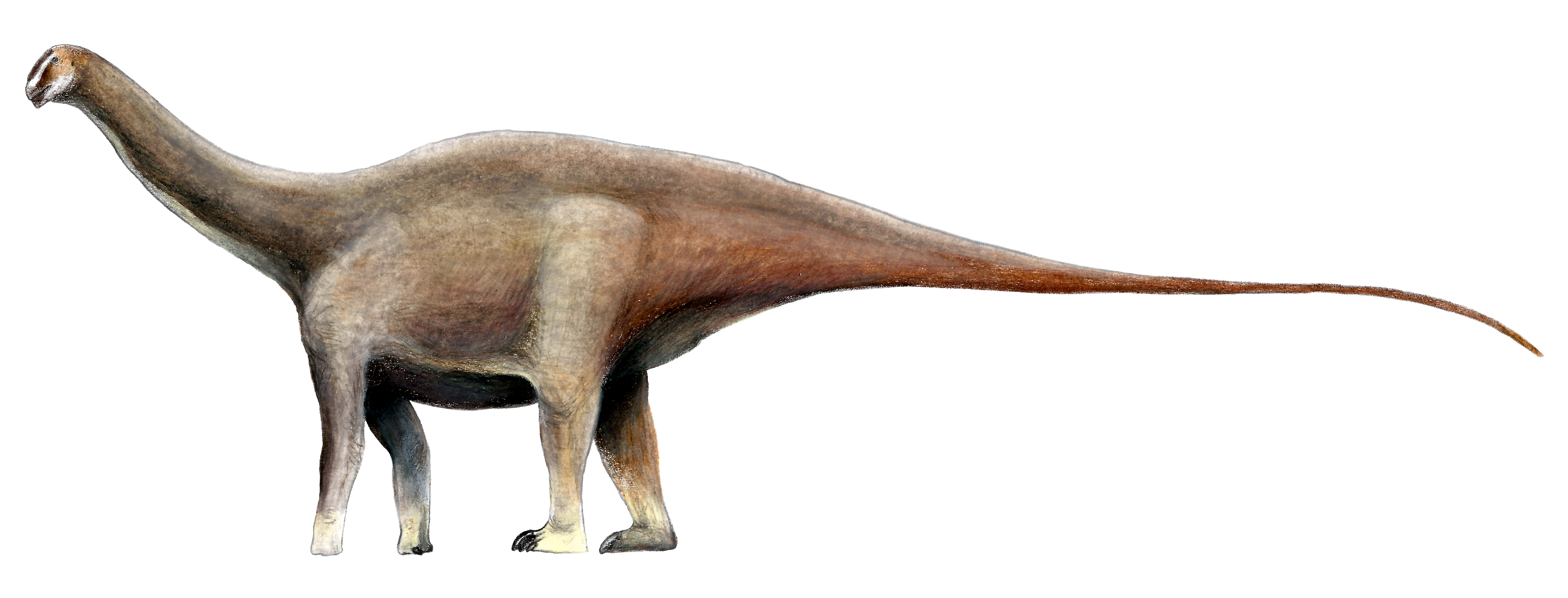
- Life reconstruction

Scientific classification
- Kingdom: Animalia
- Phylum: Chordata
- Class: Reptilia
- Clade: Dinosauria
- Clade: Saurischia
- Clade: †Sauropodomorpha
- Clade: †Sauropoda
- Superfamily: †Diplodocoidea
- Family: †Rebbachisauridae
- Genus: †Amazonsaurus; Carvalho et al., 2003
- Species: †A. maranhensis

Binomial name
- †Amazonsaurus maranhensis Carvalho et al., 2003

= Amazonsaurus =

Amazonsaurus Temporal range: Early Cretaceous, 125–100 Ma
- Skeletal reconstruction

Extinct genus of dinosaurs

Amazonsaurus (/ˌæməzənˈsɔːrəs/ AM-ə-zən-SOR-əs, 'Amazon lizard') is a genus of diplodocoid sauropod dinosaur from the Early Cretaceous Period of what is now South America. It would have been a large-bodied quadrupedal herbivore with a long neck and whiplash tail. Although more derived diplodocoids were some of the longest animals ever to exist, Amazonsaurus was probably not more than 12 meters (40 ft) long. Gregory S. Paul estimated in 2010 its weight at 5000 kg.

Fossils of Amazonsaurus, including some back and tail vertebrae, ribs, and fragments of the pelvis, are the only dinosaur remains identifiable at the generic level from the Itapecuru Formation of Maranhão. This geologic formation dates back to the Aptian through Albian epochs of the Early Cretaceous, or about 125 to 100 million years ago. Amazonsaurus was recovered in sediments which are interpreted by geologists as floodplain deposits near a river delta.

== Discovery and naming ==
Fossils of Amazonsaurus were first unearthed in the Mata locality in Itapecuru-Mirim County, Maranhão Province in the Brazilian Amazon. They were collected during a Brazilian expedition to the Lower Cretaceous-aged strata of the Itapecuru Formation of the Parnaíba Basin, a stretch of intracratonic rocks that covers much of northeastern Brazil. Over the course of its excavation, researchers collected a single, associated sauropod skeleton including two dorsal vertebral neural spines, two dorsal centra, a neural spine of an anterior caudal vertebra, four caudal vertebrae, eight chevrons, an ilium, an incomplete pubis, and three ribs. This skeleton came from the L2 lithofacies of the Itapecuru Formation, which is a layer of reddish siltsones interbedded with fine sandstones. Additionally, some invertebrate ichnofossils, turtle remains, and freshwater fish scales have been unearthed from L2 as well. The sauropod remains were later split and deposited at the Universidade Federal do Rio de Janeiro (UFRJ-DG) and the Universidade Federal do Rio de Janeiro of the Museu Nacional, however the latter institution has since been burned down by the 2018 Museu Nacional Fire. This was the first discovery of dinosaur fossils in the Amazon Basin and one of few known from northern Brazil and the first record of a sauropod from the Lower Cretaceous of Brazil.

In 2003, Brazilian paleontologists Ismar de Souza Carvalhoa and Leonardo dos Santos Avilla and Argentine paleontologist Leonardo Salgado scientifically described the remains and assigned them to a new genus and species of sauropod, which they named Amazonsaurus maranhensis. The generic name is a combination of Amazon, where the fossils were discovered, and the Greek word sauros meaning "lizard". As for the species name, maranhensis, it is in reference to Maranhão Province.

== Description ==
Amazonsaurus was a relatively small sauropod, with Brazilian professor Elver Luiz Mayer estimating it to be around 10 metres (33 ft) in length, while American paleontologist Gregory S. Paul placed it at 12 metres (39 ft) long and 5,000 kilograms (11,000 lb) in mass. This makes it relatively small for a rebbachisaurid, as some genera like Rebbachisaurus as large as 14 meters (46 ft) in length. Caudal vertebrae from both the anterior (front) and distal (away from body) sections of the tail were unearthed. Unlike other rebbachisaurids, the neural spines (large extensions from the tops of vertebrae) on the caudal vertebrae are straight and posteriorly (towards the back) inclined. This spine is oriented at a 45 degree angle and is set up at around the middle of the centrum (the body of the vertebra). Additionally, the lateral (side) laminae composed of the spinoprezygapophyseal (connecting the neural spine and prezygapophysis) and postzygodiapophyseal (between the postzygapophysis and diapophysis) laminae (bony ridges that divide pneumatic chambers) create an anteriorly-oriented bend that makes the anterior surface of the lamina concave whereas the posterior surface is convex, another trait unique to Amazonsaurus. In contrast to the laminae of Limaysaurus, Amazonsaurus' laminae have a consistent thickness from the base of the neural spines to their apexes. At the posterior ends of the vertebrae are the prezygapophyses, which run almost parallel to the axial plane of the vertebrae while the neural canal opens below the prezygapophyses. The caudal neural arches are extremely tall, typical of diplodocoids.

Its dorsal vertebrae bear slightly opisthocoelus (convex front and concave back ends), wide, and low centra. These centra have flat ventral (bottom) sides, creating a squared shape. On the lateral (side) faces are deep pleurocoels (large fossae that bore air sacs) which take up most of the internal space of the sides of the centra. As for the dorsal neural spines, they bear axially developed prespinal (before neural spine) laminae. The chevrons are distinct in their open haemal canals and relatively elongated, laterally thin shafts. They are L-shaped overall with a posterior distal process, unlike those of Limaysaurus. The pelvis is only represented by fragments from the proximal (towards body) and mid-sections of the pubis as well as the left ilium. Although lacking the aceptabular surface (the area where the femur articulates with the pelvis), an enlarged obturator foramen and broad, oar-shaped iliac peduncle were recovered. Overall, the ilium is transversely (left-to-right) wide, high, and bears pneumatic (air-bearing) adaptations.

== Biogeography ==
Basal diplodocoids are found in several parts of South America, as well as northern Africa, during the Early Cretaceous, as are titanosaurian sauropods, and the carcharodontosaurid and spinosaurid theropods. By the Late Cretaceous Period, the diplodocoids had gone extinct, while Angolatitan remained and titanosaurs proliferated. The predatory theropod families of the Early Cretaceous were also replaced by abelisaurid theropods throughout the southern continents during the Late Cretaceous (Carvalho et al., 2003; Novas et al., 2005).
