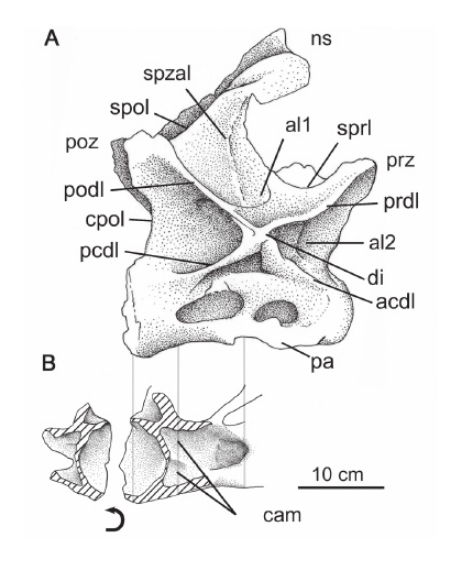
- A posterior cervical vertebra from the holotype of Cathartesaura

Scientific classification
- Kingdom: Animalia
- Phylum: Chordata
- Clade: Dinosauria
- Clade: Saurischia
- Clade: †Sauropodomorpha
- Clade: †Sauropoda
- Superfamily: †Diplodocoidea
- Family: †Rebbachisauridae
- Genus: †Cathartesaura; Gallina & Apesteguía 2005
- Species: †C. anaerobica

Binomial name
- †Cathartesaura anaerobica Gallina & Apesteguía 2005

= Cathartesaura =

Cathartesaura Temporal range: Early Cretaceous (Albian), 106.2 Ma

Extinct genus of dinosaurs

Cathartesaura is a genus of rebbachisaurid sauropod dinosaur from Early Cretaceous strata of the Huincul Formation, at the "La Buitrera" locality, in the Neuquén Basin of Río Negro Province, Argentina. The fossil remains, described by Gallina and Apesteguía in 2005, consist of a partial skeleton including vertebrae and limb bones. These were found at the base of the formation, which dates back to the Albian stage, in mudstone and sandstone levels.

== Etymology ==
The generic name is composed of Cathartes, the New World vulture genus and -saura, feminine declination of the Greek term sauros, "lizard". It also implies the juxtaposition of the components of the scientific name of the turkey vulture, Cathartes aura, whose Spanish name, "buitre", named the locality where the fossil was found due to the abundance of such birds there. The specific epithet honors the Argentinian adhesive company Anaeróbicos for providing field and laboratory support during the extraction and preparation of the fossils.

== Description ==
Cathartesaura is a medium-sized herbivorous dinosaur with a long, lightly built, well-muscled neck albeit with a somewhat limited range of dorso-ventral movement. C. anaerobica has distinguishing characteristics in the vertebrae that ally it with Rebbachisauridae, such as the bony laminae association and the pneumatic chambers in the cervical series. Being found in early Late Cretaceous sediments, along with other rebbachisaurids, the only diplodocoid group of the time, this find helps cement the notion that a subsequent extinction event wiped out these remaining diplodocoid dinosaurs leaving saltasaurine titanosaurs to occupy the vacant ecological niche.
