= Demandasaurus =

Demandasaurus Temporal range: Early Cretaceous, 125 Ma
- Skeletal reconstruction

Scientific classification
- Kingdom: Animalia
- Phylum: Chordata
- Class: Reptilia
- Clade: Dinosauria
- Clade: Saurischia
- Clade: †Sauropodomorpha
- Clade: †Sauropoda
- Superfamily: †Diplodocoidea
- Family: †Rebbachisauridae
- Genus: †Demandasaurus; Fernández-Baldor et al., 2011
- Species: †D. darwini

Binomial name
- †Demandasaurus darwini Fernández-Baldor et al., 2011

Extinct genus of dinosaurs

Demandasaurus (meaning "Demanda lizard") is a genus of rebbachisaurid sauropod dinosaur from early Cretaceous (late Barremian — early Aptian stage) deposits of Spain. Demandasaurus is known from an incomplete but associated skeleton that includes cranial and postcranial remains. It was collected from the Castrillo de la Reina Formation in Burgos Province. It was first named by Fidel Torcida Fernández-Baldor, José Ignacio Canudo, Pedro Huerta, Diego Montero, Xabier Pereda Suberbiola, and Leonardo Salgado in 2011, and the type species is Demandasaurus darwini.

== Description ==
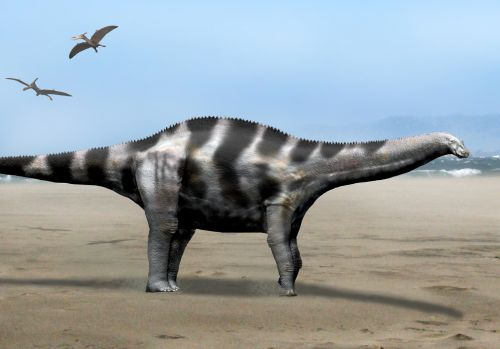
Life restoration

It has a series of singular characteristics that allow this differentiation as a new genus and species. For example, teeth with a special ornamentation of ridges in its enamel, cervical vertebrae with bone structures that are not present in other dinosaurs, neural arches of the dorsal vertebrae crossed entirely by two pneumatic fossae. The rounded shape of its snout also contrasts with the most square contour snouts of the rest of the diplodocoids and especially its close relative Nigersaurus.

== History and naming ==
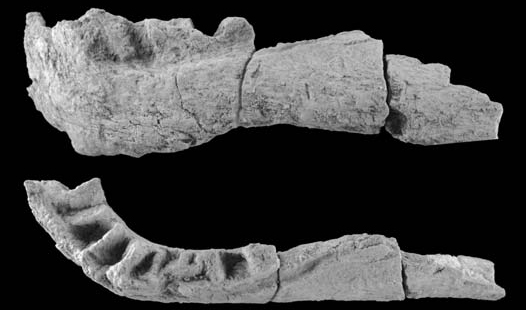
Left dentary

Demandasaurus was first collected between 2002 and 2004 by the Archaeological−Palaeontological Group of Salas de los Infantes at Tenadas de los Vallejos II, a fossil locality north of Salas de los Infantes in Burgos, Spain. The strata at the site comes from the Upper Barremian-Lower Aptian of the Castrillo de la Reina Formation, and the Demandasaurus fossils were found alongside fossils of spinosaurids, small ornithopods, and a crocodilian. About 810 fossils were collected at the site, most of them pertaining to the type skeleton of Demandasaurus. The skeleton (MDS−RVII assorted) consists of: premaxillae, left dentary, six isolated teeth, 3 cervical vertebrae, 5 cervical ribs, 2 dorsals, 9 dorsal ribs, 19 caudal vertebrae, 9 haemal arches of chevrons, ischia, and left femur. The skeleton was described as the holotype of a new taxon, Demandasaurus darwini, in 2011 by Fernández−Baldor and colleagues in the Acta Palaeontologica Polonica. The genus name comes from the Demanda mountain chain, which was where the type locality was located, and the specific name is after famous naturalist Charles Darwin. The taxon was later described in detail in the thesis of Torcida Fernández-Baldor in 2012.

== Classification and evolution ==
Demandasaurus is the only rebbachisaurid described from Spain. Demandasaurus is also one of the few known European rebbachisaurids, being the first recognized, as the group was formerly known only in Africa and South America. This taxon has a high paleobiogeographic interest due to its close kinship relationship with the African Nigersaurus it has been an argument contributed to develop the hypothesis of an African origin of Demandasaurus. Likewise, the appearance in Europe of Demandasaurus, is proof of the existence of a physical connection, an intercontinental bridge, between the two continents in that age, although it did not occur permanently.
