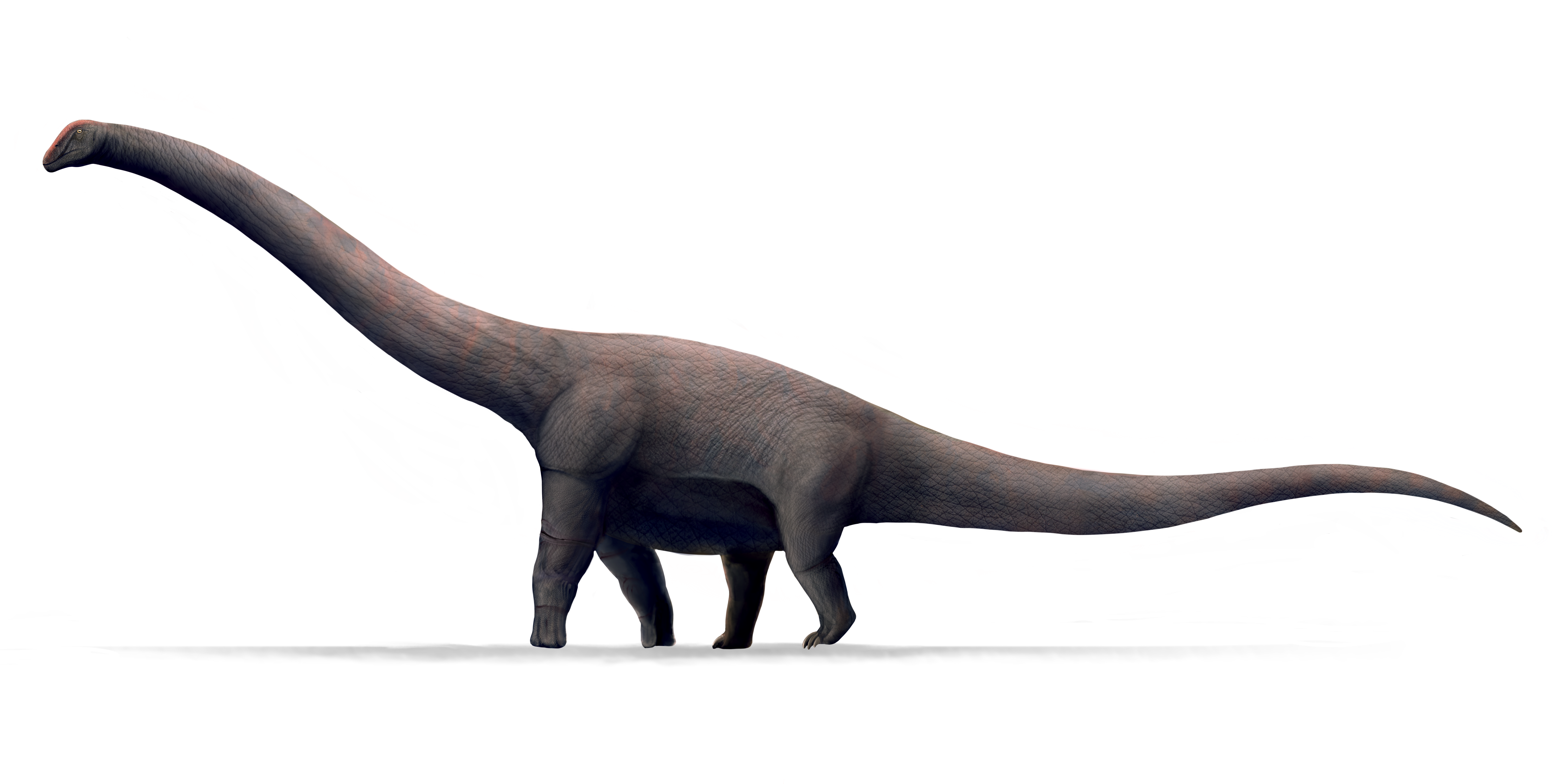
- Speculative life restoration of Bruhathkayosaurus

Scientific classification
- Kingdom: Animalia
- Phylum: Chordata
- Class: Reptilia
- Clade: Dinosauria
- Clade: Saurischia
- Clade: †Sauropodomorpha
- Clade: †Sauropoda
- Clade: †Eusauropoda
- Clade: †Macronaria
- Clade: †Titanosauria
- Genus: †Bruhathkayosaurus; Yadagiri & Ayyasami, 1987
- Species: †B. matleyi

Binomial name
- †Bruhathkayosaurus matleyi Yadagiri & Ayyasami, 1987

= Bruhathkayosaurus =

Bruhathkayosaurus Temporal range: Late Cretaceous, 70 Ma

Giant sauropod dinosaur genus from India

Bruhathkayosaurus (/bruːˌhæθkeɪoʊˈsɔːrəs/; meaning "huge-bodied lizard") is a genus of sauropod dinosaur found in the Kallamedu Formation of India. The fragmentary remains were originally described as a theropod, but it was later determined to be a titanosaur sauropod. Length estimates by researchers exceed those of the titanosaur Argentinosaurus, i.e., longer than 35 metres (115 ft) and weighing over 80 tonnes. A 2023 estimate placed Bruhathkayosaurus as potentially weighing 110–170 tonnes (110–170 long tons; 120–190 short tons), with paleontologist Michael Benton estimating a length of 45 metres (148 ft). If the upper estimates of the 2023 records are accurate, Bruhathkayosaurus may have rivaled the blue whale as one of the largest animals to ever exist. However, all of the estimates are based on the dimensions of the fossils described in 1987, but these fossils have since disintegrated and no longer exist, making it impossible to affirm these estimates.

== Discovery and naming ==
Bruhathkayosaurus type locality in Kallamedu village, Tiruchirappalli district, Tamil Nadu, India

The holotype of Bruhathkayosaurus, GSI PAL/SR/20, was discovered around 1978 near the southern tip of India, specifically in the Tiruchirappalli district of Tamil Nadu, northeast of Kallamedu village. It was recovered from rocks of the Kallamedu Formation, which are dated to the Maastrichtian stage of the Late Cretaceous, about 70 million years ago. The fossilized remains include hip bones (the ilium and ischium), partial leg bones (femur and tibia), a forearm (radius) and a tail bone (part of a vertebra, specifically a platycoelous caudal centrum). The remains were originally classified as belonging to a carnosaurian theropod by P. Yadagiri and K. Ayyasami in 1987 (not 1989, as some sources indicate). The generic name chosen, "Bruhathkayosaurus", is derived from a combination of the Sanskrit word Bruhathkaya (bṛhat बृहत्, 'huge, heavy' and kāya, काय 'body'), and the Greek sauros (lizard). The specific epithet, "matleyi", honours British palaeontologist Charles Alfred Matley, who discovered many fossils in India.

The monsoon season, combined with the sands and clays of the Kallamedu Formation, creates water-saturated fossils which are very friable. During the dry season, expansion during the day and contraction during the night can cause fossils to split apart. This results in poorly preserved bones that can be impossible to extract without damage. In 2017, Galton and Ayyasami reported that the Bruhathkayosaurus fossils started to disintegrate inside their field jackets before reaching the Geological Survey of India (GSI) and no longer exist.

== Classification ==
Bruhathkayosaurus was originally classified as a carnosaurian theropod (like Allosaurus), of an uncertain position (incertae sedis). However, Chatterjee (1995) re-examined the remains and demonstrated that Bruhathkayosaurus is actually a titanosaur sauropod. Some later studies listed Bruhathkayosaurus as an indeterminate sauropod or as a nomen dubium.

The original publication described little in the way of diagnostic characteristics and was only supported by a few line drawings and photographs of the fossils as they lay in the ground. This led to online speculation by researchers that the bones might actually have been petrified wood, akin to the way the original discoverers of Sauroposeidon initially believed their find to be fossilized tree trunks. A 2022 review by Pal and Ayyasami presented additional previously unseen photographs of the tibia bone at the excavation site and in a plaster jacket, and reinforced the taxon's position within Titanosauria. However, as Dhananjay M. Mohabey and colleagues noted in 2024, "this new information has not resolved the identity of the element nor the validity of the taxon."

== Size estimates ==
According to the published description, the shin bone (tibia) of Bruhathkayosaurus was 2 m (6.6 ft) long. This is 29 percent larger than the fibula of Argentinosaurus, which is only 1.55 m (5.1 ft) long. The fragmentary femur was similarly huge; across the distal end, it measured 75 cm (2.46 ft), 33% larger than the femur of Antarctosaurus giganteus, which measures 56 cm (1.84 ft). The ilium measured 1.2 m (3.9 ft) in length.

No total body size estimates for Bruhathkayosaurus have been published, but paleontologists and researchers have posted tentative estimates on the Internet. In a post from June 2001, Mickey Mortimer estimated that Bruhathkayosaurus could have reached 44.1 m (145 ft) in length and might have weighed 175–220 t (193–243 short tons), but in later posts retracted these estimates, reducing the estimated length to 28–47 m (92–154 ft) based on more complete titanosaurs (Saltasaurus, Opisthocoelicaudia and Rapetosaurus), and declined to provide a new weight estimate, describing the older weight estimates as inaccurate. In a May 2008 article for the blog Sauropod Vertebra Picture of the Week, paleontologist Matt Wedel used a comparison with Argentinosaurus and calculated the weight of Bruhathkayosaurus at up to 126 metric tons (139 short tons). In 2019, Gregory S. Paul suggested that the supposed tibia was probably a degraded femur, in which case its length was slightly greater than that of Dreadnoughtus (1.91 meters) and Futalognkosaurus (1.98 meters). Its ilium is similar in length to that of Dreadnoughtus whereas the width of the distal femur appears to slightly exceed that of Patagotitan. Paul estimated its mass at around 30–55 t (33–61 short tons), much lower than any previous estimation. In 2020, Molina-Perez and Larramendi suggested that the 2 m (6.6 ft) long tibia is probably a fibula, and estimated the size of the animal at 37 m (121 ft) and 95 metric tons (105 short tons).

By comparison, the titanosaur Argentinosaurus is estimated to have reached 35 m (115 ft) in length, and to have weighed 65–100 tonnes. These sauropods are known only from partial or fragmentary remains, so the size estimates are uncertain. Length is calculated by comparing existing bones to the bones of similar dinosaurs, which are known from more complete skeletons and scaling them up isometrically. However, such extrapolation can never be more than an educated guess and the length of the tail, in particular, is often hard to judge. Determining mass is even more difficult because little evidence of soft tissues survives in the fossil record. In addition, isometric scaling is based on the assumption that body proportions remain the same, which is not necessarily the case. In particular, the proportions of the titanosaurs are not well known, due to a limited number of relatively complete specimens.

If the upper size estimates for Bruhathkayosaurus are accurate, it would even rival the size of the largest recorded blue whale. Mature blue whales can reach 30 m (98 ft) in length, and the record-holder blue whale was recorded at 173 tonnes (190 short tons), with estimates of up to 199 tonnes (220 short tons).

Another poorly known sauropod that shares similar size estimates to Bruhathkayosaurus is Maraapunisaurus fragillimus, which is based on a now-missing dorsal vertebra. In 2006, Kenneth Carpenter used Diplodocus as a guide and estimated Maraapunisaurus to be 58 m (190 ft) in length and weigh only about 122.4 metric tons (130 short tons). In 2018, however, Carpenter estimated Maraapunisaurus to be 30–32 m (98–105 ft) in length based upon comparisons with rebbachisaurids. In 2019, Paul gave a higher estimation of 35 to 40 metres (115 to 131 ft) and a weight of 80 to 120 tonnes (88 to 132 short tons).

Paul and Larramendi (2023) suggested that Bruhathkayosaurus may have weighed within the range of 110–170 tonnes (120–190 short tons), though they stated that it would have likely weighed between 110 and 130 tonnes (120 and 140 short tons). Whilst its most liberal estimate was 240 tons when scaled with Patagotitan, they considered any estimate over 170 tonnes (190 short tons) to be unlikely. Nevertheless, Paul stressed that the idea of these 'super-sauropods' or 'land-whales' aren't as far-fetched as one would think given the long period of sauropod existence as well as their very efficient body-plan (i.e. small heads, large body, efficient ventilated air-sacs, strong and flexible muscle and bone structure, and large source of static food), indicating that the existence of 150+ ton sauropods such as Bruhathkayosaurus and Maraapunisaurus are in the realm of possibility.

== See also ==
- Largest prehistoric animals
- Largest and heaviest animals
- Dinosaur size
- Breviparopus
- Patagotitan
