= Tallest extant birds =

This is a list of the tallest extant birds according to maximum height. Birds range from a tiny bee hummingbird (Mellisuga helenae), which is only 5–6 cm (2.0–2.4 in), to the giant common ostrich (Struthio camelus), almost 280 cm (9.2 ft) in height.

Rank	Image	Common name	Binomial name	Maximum height
1		Common ostrich	Struthio camelus	2.8 m (9.2 ft)
2		Somali ostrich	Struthio molybdophanes	2.75 m (9.0 ft)
3		Southern cassowary	Casuarius casuarius	2 m (6.6 ft)
4		Emu	Dromaius novaehollandiae	1.9 m (6.2 ft)
5		Greater rhea	Rhea americana	1.83 m (6.0 ft)
6		Sarus crane	Antigone antigone	1.8 m (5.9 ft)
7		Northern cassowary	Casuarius unappendiculatus	1.8 m (5.9 ft)
8		Saddle-billed stork	Ephippiorhynchus senegalensis	1.8 m (5.9 ft)
9		Wattled crane	Grus carunculata	1.75 m (5.7 ft)
10		Japanese crane	Grus japonensis	1.6 m (5.2 ft)
11		Whooping crane	Grus americana	1.6 m (5.2 ft)
12		Jabiru	Jabiru mycteria	1.53 m (5.0 ft)
13		Goliath heron	Ardea goliath	1.52 m (5 ft)
14		Marabou stork	Leptoptilos crumenifer	1.52 m (5 ft)
15		Black-necked stork	Ephippiorhynchus asiaticus	1.50 m (5 ft)
16		Greater adjutant	Leptoptilos dubius	1.50 m (5 ft)
17		Dwarf cassowary	Casuarius bennetti	1.50 m (5 ft)

== See also ==
- Dinosaur size
