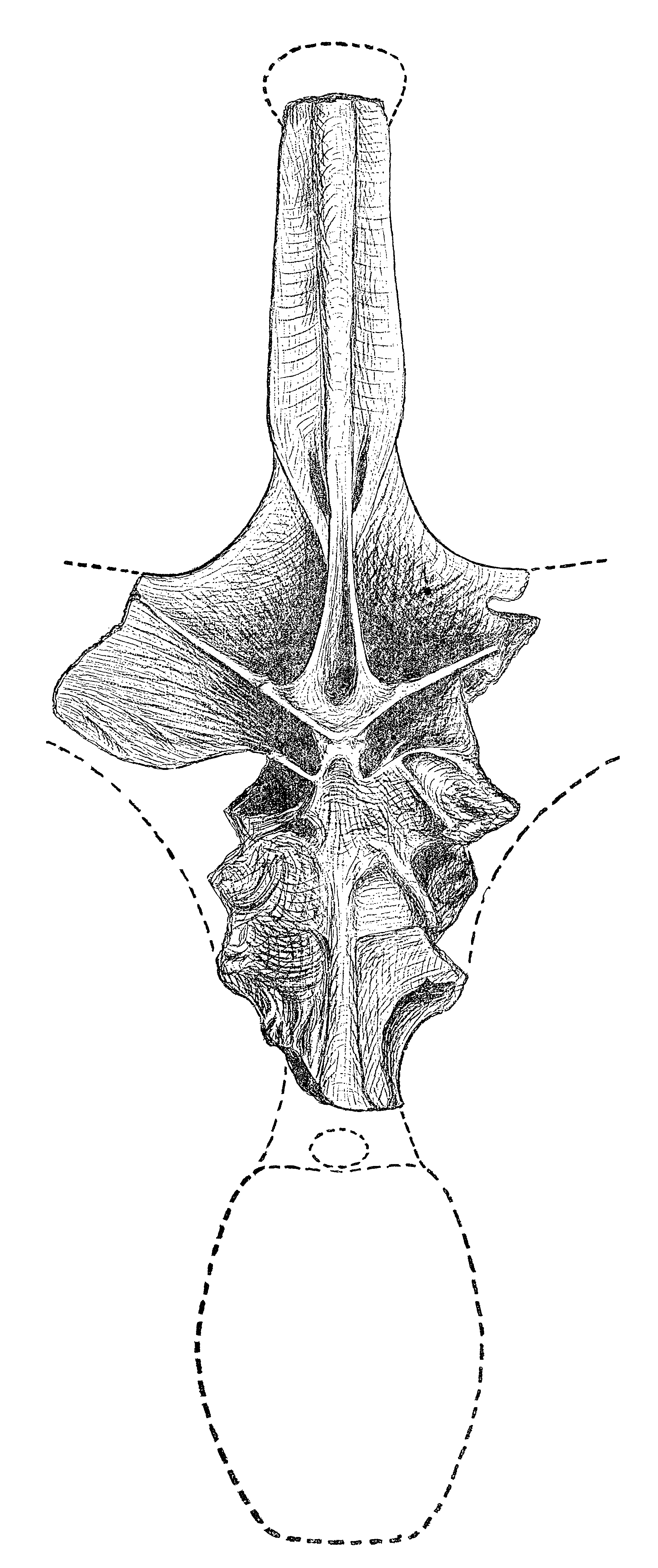
- Original illustration, dating to c. 1878, of E. D. Cope's M. fragillimus specimen

Scientific classification
- Kingdom: Animalia
- Phylum: Chordata
- Class: Reptilia
- Clade: Dinosauria
- Clade: Saurischia
- Clade: †Sauropodomorpha
- Clade: †Sauropoda
- Clade: †Eusauropoda
- Superfamily: †Diplodocoidea
- Family: †Rebbachisauridae
- Genus: †Maraapunisaurus; Carpenter, 2018
- Species: †M. fragillimus

Binomial name
- †Maraapunisaurus fragillimus (Cope, 1878)

Synonyms
- Amphicoelias fragillimus Cope, 1878

= Maraapunisaurus =

Maraapunisaurus Temporal range: Late Jurassic, 150 Ma

Lost specimen of giant sauropod dinosaur from Colorado

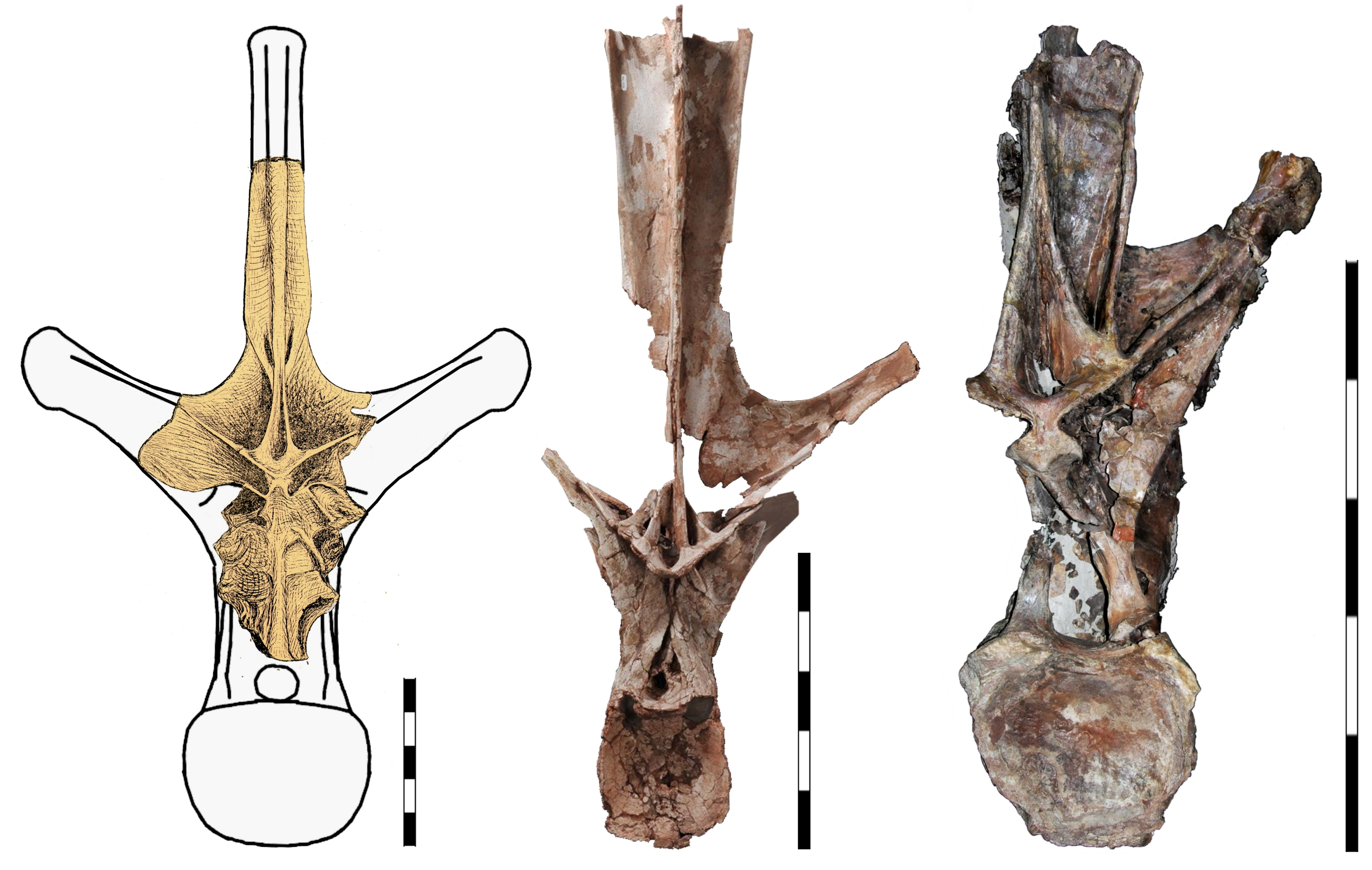
Comparison of Maraapunisaurus (left) with the rebbachisaurids Rebbachisaurus (center) and Histriasaurus (right).

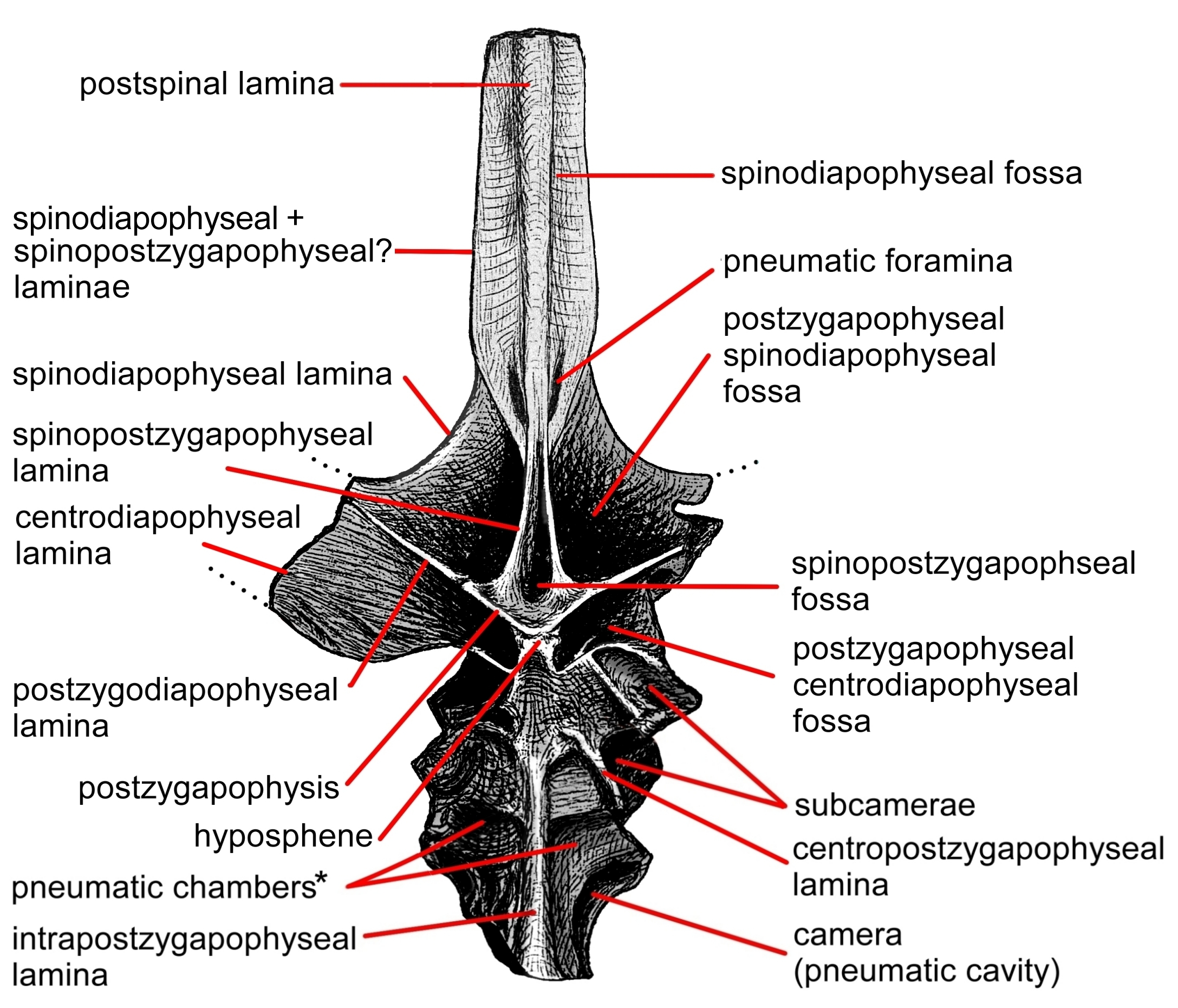
Neural spine of Maraapunisaurus as drawn by E.D. Cope with parts labeled. The key rebbachisaurid features are the spinopostzygapophyseal laminae that extends dorsomedially from the postzygapophyses to join and form the postspinal lamina, and the pneumatic neural spine and arch. Other rebbachisaurid features include the rather simple ("attenuated") structure of the neural spine and the respective inclinations of the centrodiapophyseal lamina and the postzygodiapophyseal laminae.

Maraapunisaurus is a genus of sauropod dinosaur from the Late Jurassic Morrison Formation of western North America. It contains one species, Maraapunisaurus fragillimus, which was originally named Amphicoelias fragillimus. It has sometimes been estimated to be the largest dinosaur specimen ever discovered. Based on surviving descriptions of a single fossil bone, scientists have produced numerous size estimates over the years; the largest estimate M. fragillimus to have been the longest known animal at 58 metres (190 ft) in length with a mass of 150 tonnes (150 long tons; 170 short tons). However, because the only fossil remains were lost at some point after being studied and described in the 1870s, evidence survived only in contemporary drawings and field notes.

More recent studies have made a number of suggestions regarding the possibility of such an animal. One analysis of the surviving evidence, and the biological plausibility of such a large land animal, has suggested that the enormous size of this animal were over-estimates due partly to typographical errors in the original 1878 description. More recently, it was suggested by paleontologist Kenneth Carpenter that the species is a rebbachisaurid, rather than a diplodocid sauropod. He therefore used Limaysaurus instead of Diplodocus as a basis for size estimates. This resulted in a smaller, 31-metre (102 ft) animal, and he dismissed the idea that there must have been typographical errors. Since then, somewhat larger size estimates have been made, placing Maraapunisaurus at 70 ―120 tons in mass and 35–40 metres (115–131 ft) long, which still makes Maraapunisaurus the third-longest known vertebrate to have ever lived, behind Bruhathkayosaurus and Supersaurus specimen BYU 9024. Maraapunisaurus also has the tallest and largest neural spine out of any animal (2.7-metre (8.9 ft)).

== History of study ==
=== Original description ===
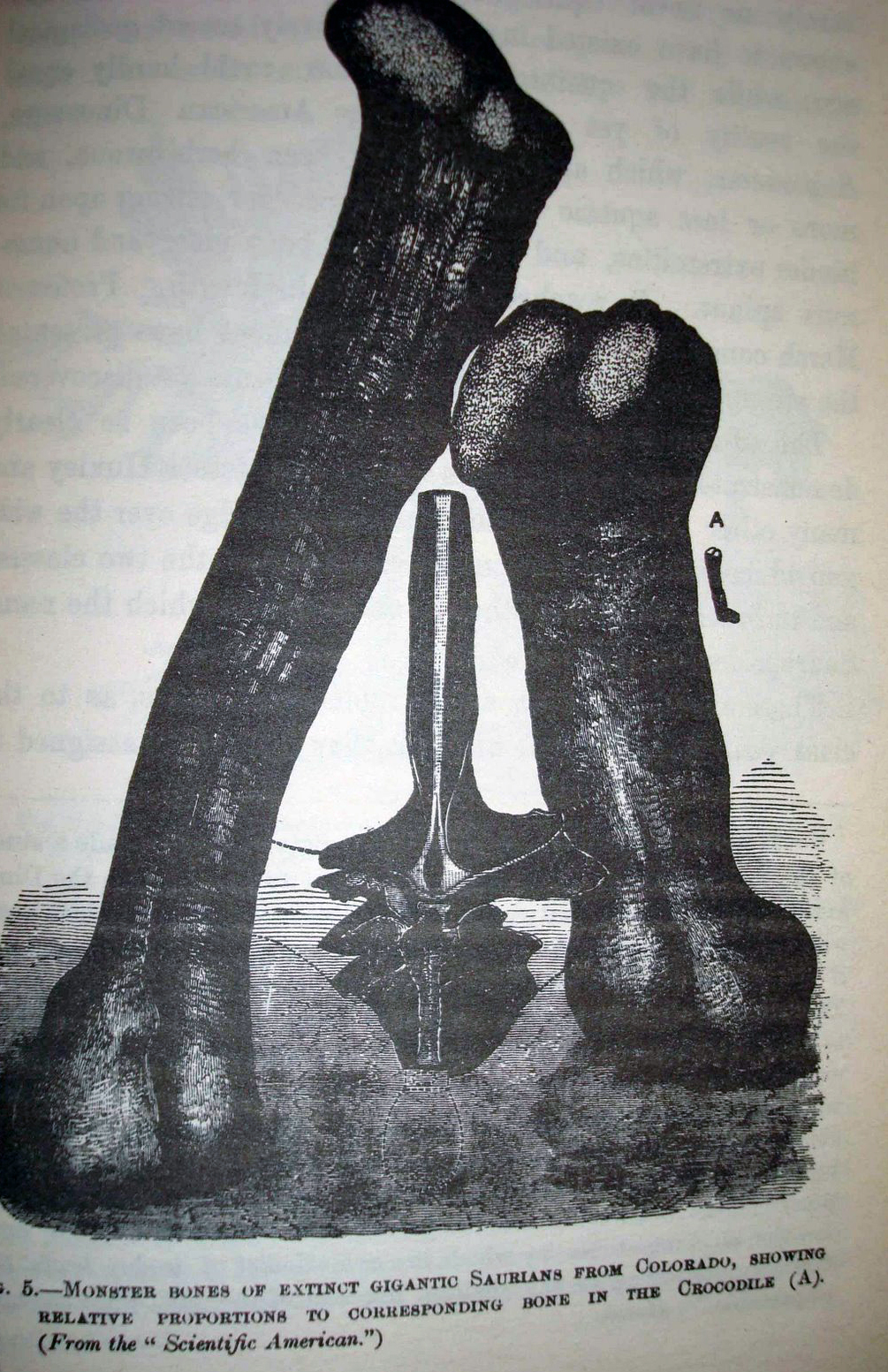
Illustration of M. fragillimus fossils, with an alligator femur (A) for scale, drawn in 1884

The holotype and only known specimen of Maraapunisaurus fragillimus was collected by Oramel William Lucas, shortly after he had been hired as a fossil collector by the renowned paleontologist Edward Drinker Cope, in 1877. Lucas discovered a partial vertebra (the neural arch including the spine) of a new sauropod species in Garden Park, north of Cañon City, Colorado, close to the quarry that yielded the first specimens of Camarasaurus. The vertebra was in poor condition, but astonishingly large. It was probably colored a very pale tan, tinted with maroon, like most fossils from the same area. The preserved parts perhaps measured 1.5 meters (4.9 ft) in height; its original height might have been as tall as 2.7 meters (8.9 ft). Lucas sent the specimen to Cope's house in Philadelphia in the spring or early summer of 1878, and Cope published it as the holotype specimen of a new species in the genus Amphicoelias as A. fragillimus, that August. In addition to this vertebra, Cope's 1879 field notes contain an entry for an "[i]mmense distal end of femur”, located only a few tens of meters away from the giant vertebra. This specimen was never formally referred to the species. Maraapunisaurus means 'huge reptile' based on maraapuni, the Southern Ute for 'huge'.

The specific name was chosen to express that the fossil was "very fragile", referring to the delicateness of the bone produced by very thin laminae (vertebral ridges). In 1902, Oliver Perry Hay hypercorrected the name to the Latin fragilissimus, but such emendations are not allowed by the ICZN (International Code of Zoological Nomenclature). In any case, fragillimus is the correct superlative of fragilis in Latin. As revealed in Cope's notebooks, which he recorded based on Lucas' report on excavation site locations in 1879, the specimen came from a hill south of the Camarasaurus quarry now known as "Cope's Nipple", also sometimes known simply as "the Nipple" or "Saurian Hill".

=== Disappearance of the specimen and quarry ===
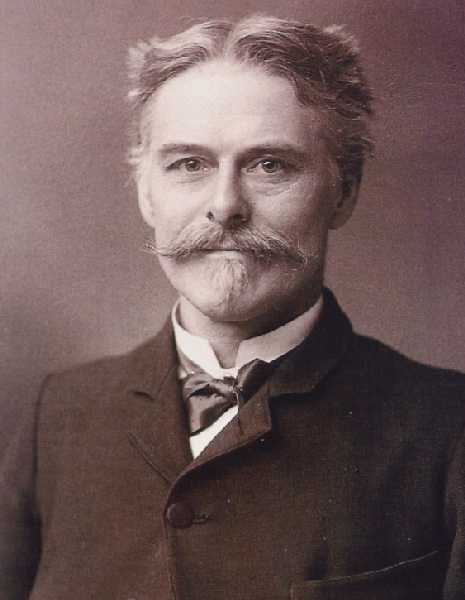
Edward Drinker Cope was the only paleontologist to study M. fragillimus before its only known specimen disappeared

The gigantic vertebra has often been ignored in summaries of the largest dinosaurs partly because, according to subsequent reports, the whereabouts of both the vertebra and the femur are unknown, and all attempts to locate them have failed. Kenneth Carpenter, in 2006, presented a possible scenario for the disappearance of the specimen. As Cope noted in his description, the neural arch bone material was very fragile, and techniques to harden and preserve fossil bone had not yet been invented (Cope's rival, paleontologist Othniel Charles Marsh, was the first to use such resins, in the early 1880s). Carpenter observed that the fossil bones known from the quarry would have been preserved in deeply weathered mudstone, which tends to crumble easily and fragment into small, irregular cubes. Therefore, the bone may have crumbled badly and been discarded by Cope soon after he illustrated it in rear view for his paper. Carpenter suggested that this may explain why Cope drew the vertebra in only one view, rather than from multiple angles as he did for his other discoveries.

In 2018, Carpenter recounted how Cope's collections were after his death sold to the American Museum of Natural History in 1897. While cataloging them, William Diller Matthew was unable to locate many important pieces, among them the holotype of A. fragillimus. Because of the possibility that it would turn up eventually, it was given the catalog number AMNH 5777.

In 1994, an attempt was made to relocate the original quarry where the species and others had been found, using ground-penetrating radar to image bones still buried in the ground. The attempt failed because the fossilized mudstone bones were the same density as the surrounding rock, making it impossible to differentiate between the two. A study of the local topography also showed that the fossil-bearing rock strata were severely eroded, and probably were so when Lucas discovered M. fragillimus, suggesting that a majority of the skeleton had already disappeared when the vertebra was recovered.

=== Modern interpretations ===
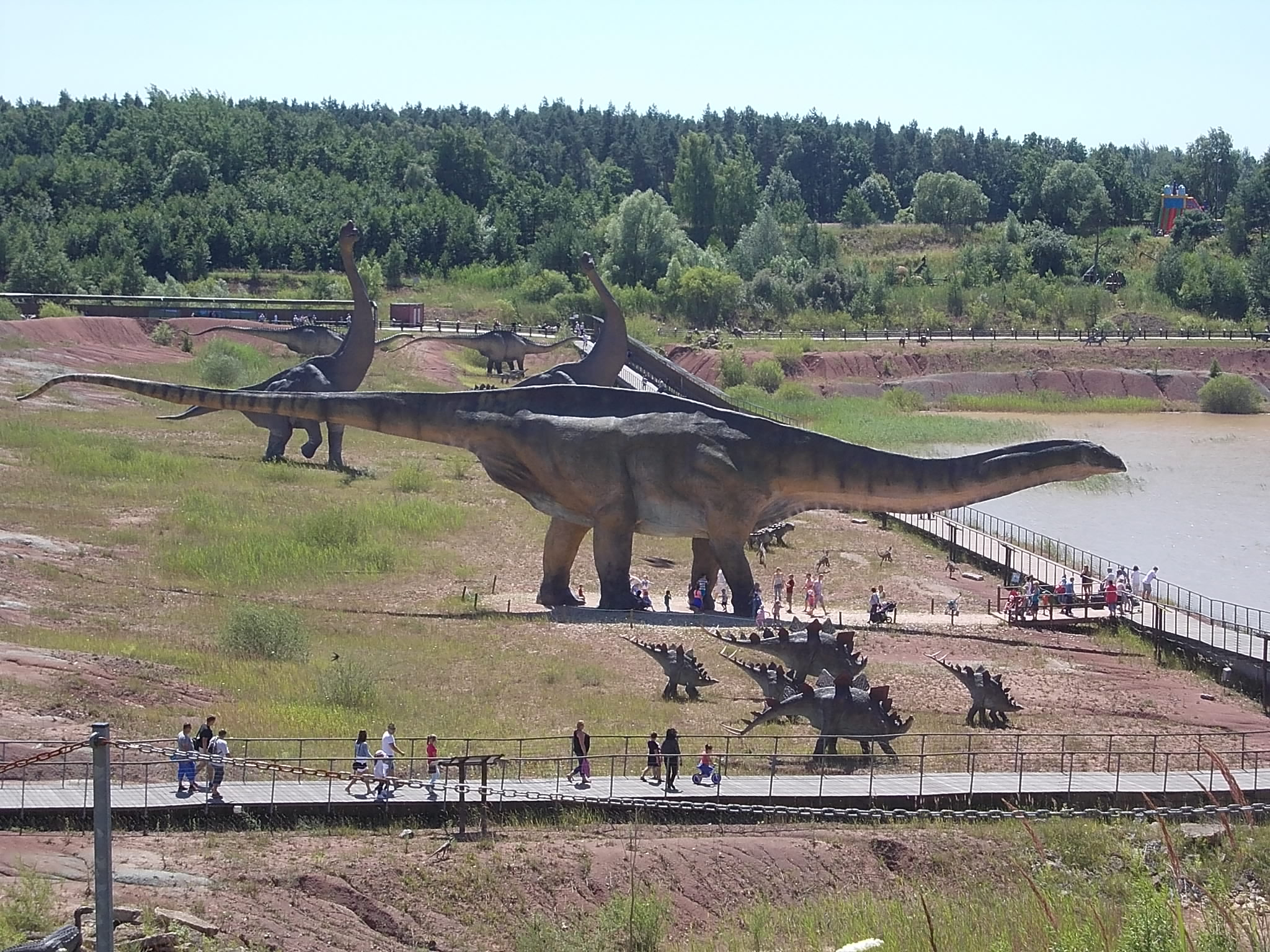
Sculpture in Poland showing Maraapunisaurus as a diplodocid

The giant proportions of the vertebra have been debated by paleontologists. Carpenter has argued that there is every reason to take Cope at his word, noting that the paleontologist's reputation was at stake. The discovery took place during the Bone Wars, and Cope's rival Marsh, who was "ever ready to humiliate" Cope, never called the claims into question. Marsh was known to have employed spies to monitor Cope's discoveries, and may have even had confirmation of the enormous size of the bones. Paleontologists Henry Fairfield Osborn and C.C. Mook in 1921, as well as John S. McIntosh in 1998, also accepted Cope's data without question in published reviews.

Other paleontologists have been more critical. In a 2015 analysis of the evidence and circumstances surrounding the publication and interpretation of the discovery, Cary Woodruff and John R. Foster concluded that the vertebra's size has been overestimated and that modern paleontologists were accepting Cope's interpretation without due skepticism. They point out that no comparably gigantic sauropod fossils have been discovered in the Morrison Formation, that 19th century paleontologists – including Cope himself – paid no attention to the size of the fossil (even when it may have substantiated Cope's rule of size increase in animal lineages over time), and the general implausibility of any terrestrial animal achieving such sizes, all facts which should impact the scientific reception of the reported measurement. Woodruff and Foster offer the hypothesis that the reported measurement of 1,500 millimeters (59 in) is likely a typographical error for 1,050 millimeters (41 in). Supporting this, the proportions of Cope's illustration and reported measurements for the zygapophyses and diaphysis are more consistent with the smaller number. The proposed downsizing still represents a very large vertebra (the largest known from the Morrison Formation, and one of the largest in the world), consistent with Cope's reconstruction of the vertebra as 6 feet (1.8 m) when complete. Also, they point out other examples of typos in Cope's work, including reporting this measurement as "m." instead of "mm." They concluded that the super-gigantic M. fragillimus is a "highly unlikely" creature based on unquestioning interpretation of Cope's report.

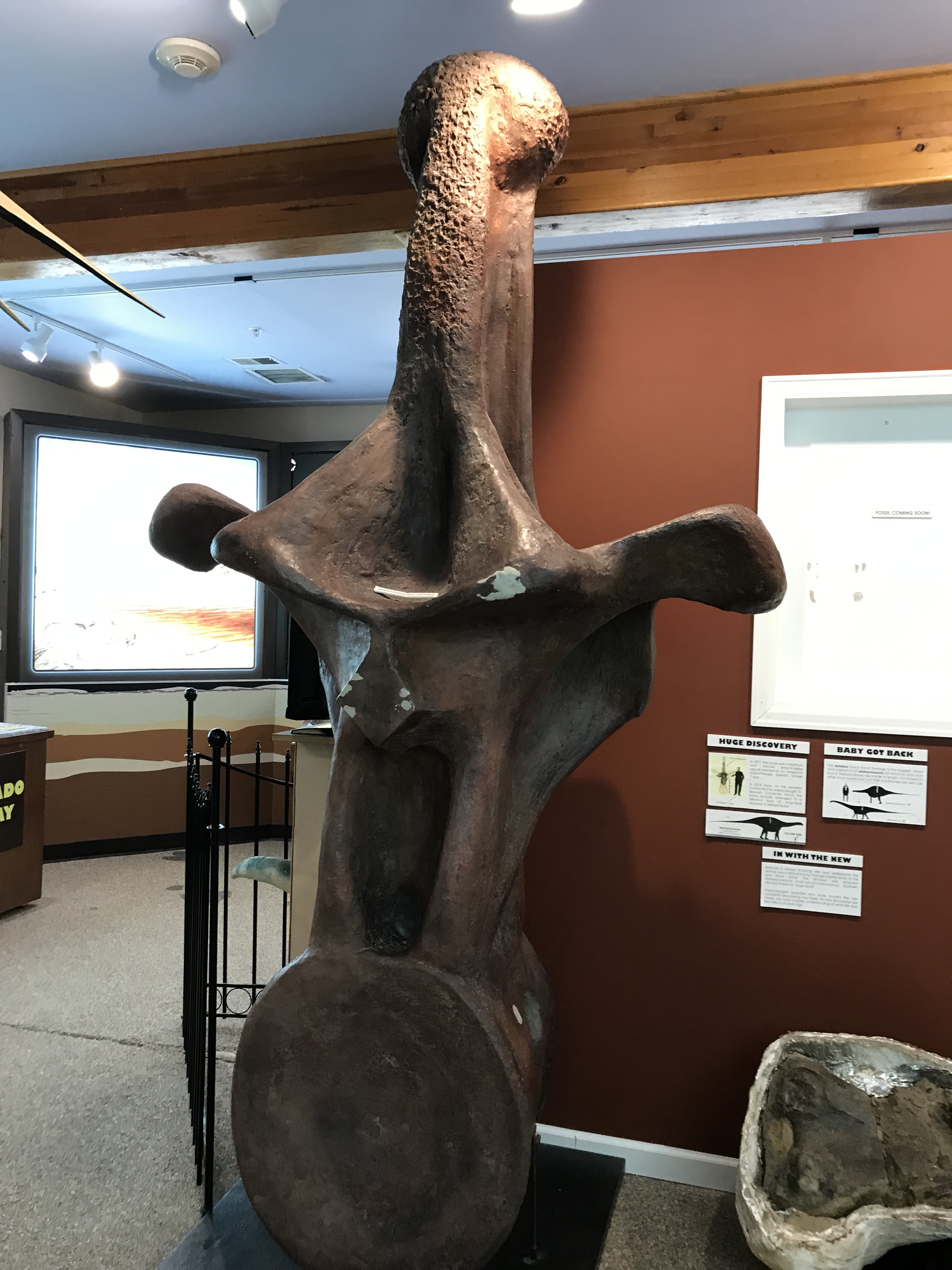
Reconstruction of the holotype vertebra

In 2018, Carpenter once again defended the original measurements given by Cope in a paper re-describing the species based on Cope's illustration and description. The argument of a typographical error pointed to Cope's use of the abbreviation "m" rather than "mm" for millimeters, the same as used for meters, but Carpenter points out a capital "M" is used for meters, and that this was a standard method of abbreviation in the time period. In addition to this, he pointed to a letter from Lucas to Ferdinand Vandeveer Hayden, a survey geologist, wherein Lucas corroborated Cope's estimate of 6 feet (1.8 m) when complete, a measurement Lucas called "almost fabulous" for its size but did not question its veracity. Lucas often made his own specific measurements and annotated drawings of his fossils, so Carpenter considers it unlikely he would have been merely re-stating what Cope had said. Later, in 1880, Lucas included specific mention of the specimen in his autobiography, noting "[w]hat a monster the animal must have been," contradicting the idea that no attention was given to the importance of the vertebra. Carpenter was critical of the typographical theory, saying: "It is unfortunate that they seek to disprove Cope’s claim by casting aspersions about the quality of his work and go so far as to alter Cope’s measurements."

Upon studying the drawing of the specimen again, Carpenter found that it bore a strong resemblance to the vertebrae of rebbachisaurid diplodocoids; previously it had been allied with the type species of Amphicoelias, A. altus, as a diplodocid or primitive diplodocoid. Considering it to be a rebbachisaurid upon his re-examination, the species could not be referred to the genus Amphicoelias, and so he gave it a new generic name, Maraapunisaurus. Apparently, Carpenter was inspired by work of paleontology enthusiasts posted on the website DeviantArt; one user, Zachary Armstrong, known as "palaeozoologist" on the website, conjectured the same classification in 2014, four years before Carpenter's publication. He is credited in the acknowledgements of the paper. Naming a genus based on a lost specimen is rare, but he pointed out that the ICZN explicitly allows it, and the genus Nopcsaspondylus had been named in a similar fashion. The generic name is derived from the Southern Ute word "Ma-ra-pu-ni", meaning "huge", and the Latinised Greek saurus, meaning reptile. The name was suggested to Carpenter by the Southern Ute Cultural Department, based in Ignacio, Colorado.

== Description ==
=== Size ===
Skeletal reconstruction of Maraapunisaurus as a rebbachisaurid

Any size estimate of M. fragillimus must be regarded with caution because of the lack of specimens and detailed, accurate documentation of its fossils. All size estimates are based on Cope's original description, which has somewhat vague measurements. It has also been suggested that it contains potentially critical typographical errors, but this idea has been disputed.

Producing an estimate of the complete size of M. fragillimus requires scaling the bones of better-described, closely related species based on the assumption that their relative proportions were similar. In his original paper, Cope did this while speculating on the size of a hypothetical M. fragillimus femur (upper leg bone). Cope stated that in other sauropod dinosaurs, specifically Amphicoelias altus and Camarasaurus supremus, the femora were always twice as tall as the tallest dorsal (back) vertebra, and estimated the size of an M. fragillimus femur to be 12 ft (3.6 m) tall.

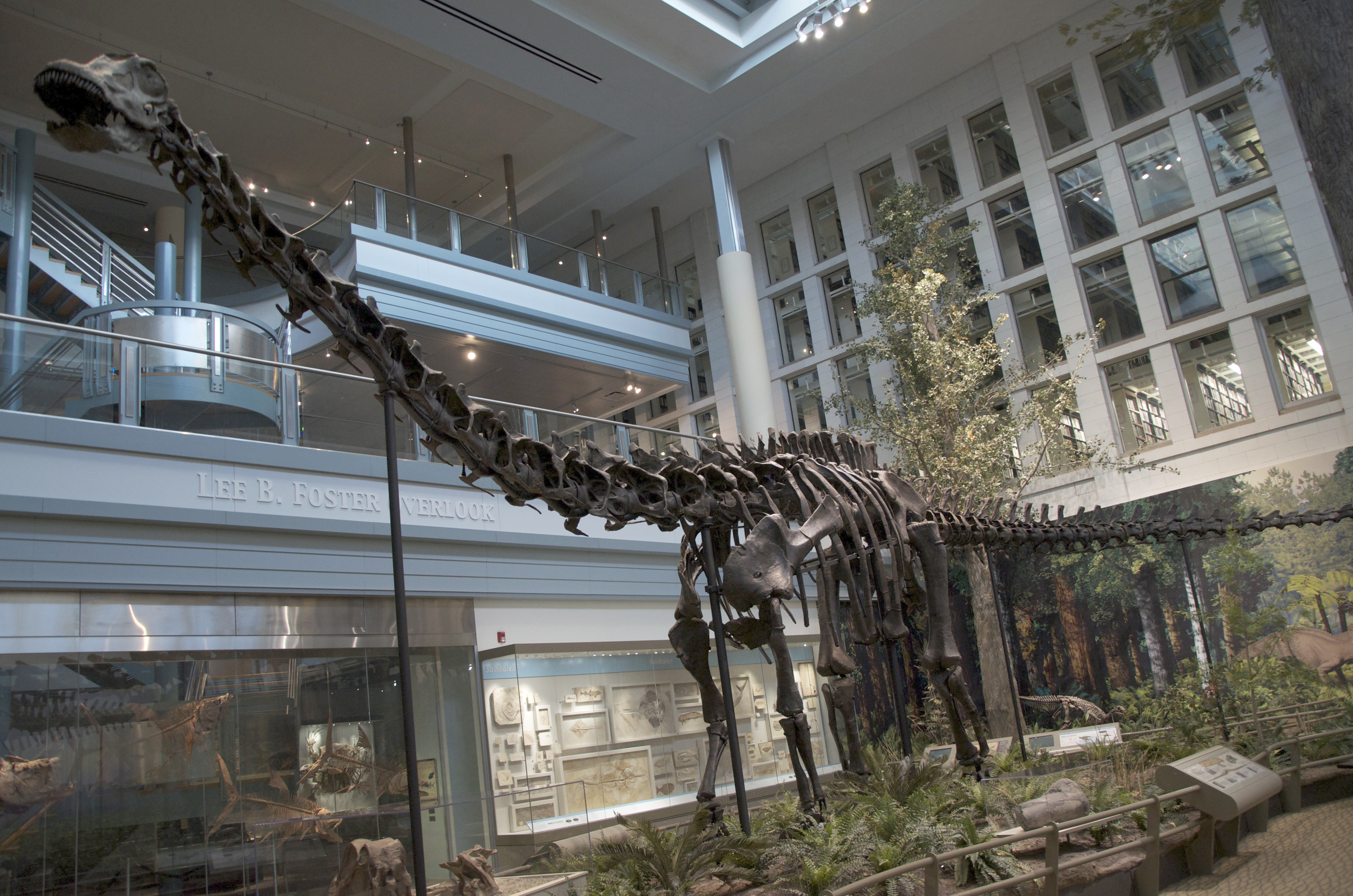
Diplodocus was used by several studies to estimate the size of Maraapunisaurus, assumed to be a diplodocid

In 1994, using the related Diplodocus as a reference, Gregory S. Paul estimated a femur length of 3.1 to 4 meters (10 to 13 ft) for M. fragillimus. The 2006 re-evaluation of M. fragillimus by Carpenter also used Diplodocus as a scale guide, finding a femur height of 4.3 to 4.6 meters (14 to 15 ft). Carpenter went on to estimate the complete size of M. fragillimus, though he cautioned that relative proportions in diplodocids could vary from species to species. Assuming the same proportions as the well-known Diplodocus, Carpenter presented an estimated total length of 58 m (190 ft), which he noted fell within the range presented by Paul in 1994 (40 to 60 meters (130 to 200 ft)). Carpenter pointed out that even the lowest length estimates for A. fragillimus were higher than those for other giant sauropods, such as the diplodocid Supersaurus (32.5 meters (107 ft)), the brachiosaurid Sauroposeidon (34 meters (112 ft)), and the titanosaur Argentinosaurus (30 meters (98 ft)). Carpenter presented more speculative, specific proportions for M. fragillimus (again, based on a scaled-up Diplodocus), including a neck length of 16.75 meters (55.0 ft), a body length of 9.25 meters (30.3 ft), and a tail length of 32 meters (105 ft). He estimated the total forelimb height at 5.75 meters (18.9 ft) and hind limb height at 7.5 meters (25 ft), and the overall height (at the highest point on the back) at 9.25 meters (30.3 ft). By comparison, the blue whale reaches 29.9 meters (98 ft) in length.

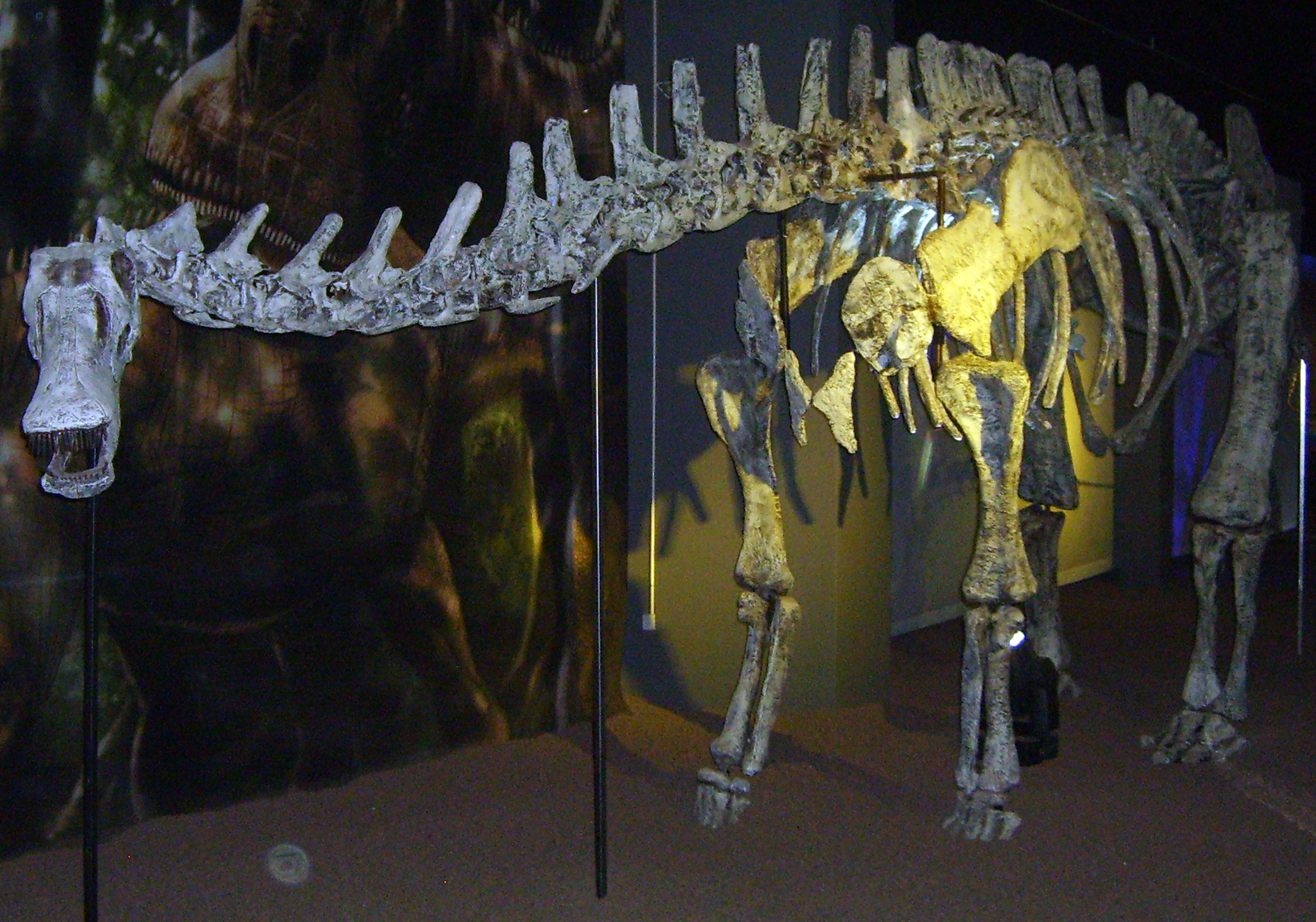
Limaysaurus was used by Carpenter in 2018 to estimate the size of Maraapunisaurus as a rebbachisaurid

When Carpenter redescribed the taxon as a rebbachisaurid instead of a diplodocid in 2018, he made new, very different, size estimates. As his classification scheme put it much farther away from Diplodocus taxonomically, he decided to use Limaysaurus as a model instead; among rebbachisaurids, it was chosen for its completeness because fossils of most other species (including other rebbachisaurids) are mostly fragmentary. Scaling up Limaysaurus directly, he estimated the length of Maraapunisaurus to be 30.3 metres (99 ft); additionally, he found it to be 7.95 metres (26.1 ft) tall at the hips and the vertebra to be 2.4 metres (7.9 ft). However, he noted that a study from a 2006 book calculated that the neck length of a sauropod scales with the length of the torso by a power of 1.35. With this in mind, he estimated Maraapunisaurus at a slightly longer 32 metres (105 ft). The neck of the animal in the smaller estimate was about 6 metres (20 ft) in length, whereas the larger scaled estimate found a neck of 7.6 metres (25 ft) in length. Overall, the revised length of the animal was around half of his earlier estimate, but still comparable to the other largest diplodocoids such as Supersaurus vivianae and Diplodocus hallorum. Also based on Limaysaurus, the complete femur was estimated to have been roughly 2.9 metres (9.5 ft) tall, significantly smaller than older estimates by Cope, Carpenter, and other subsequent authors. Finally, he estimated the length of the toes of the hindfoot, and thus the imprint surface, at 1.36 metres (4.5 ft), resulting in a foot similar in size to the animal that must have made the giant sauropods tracks in Broome, Australia.

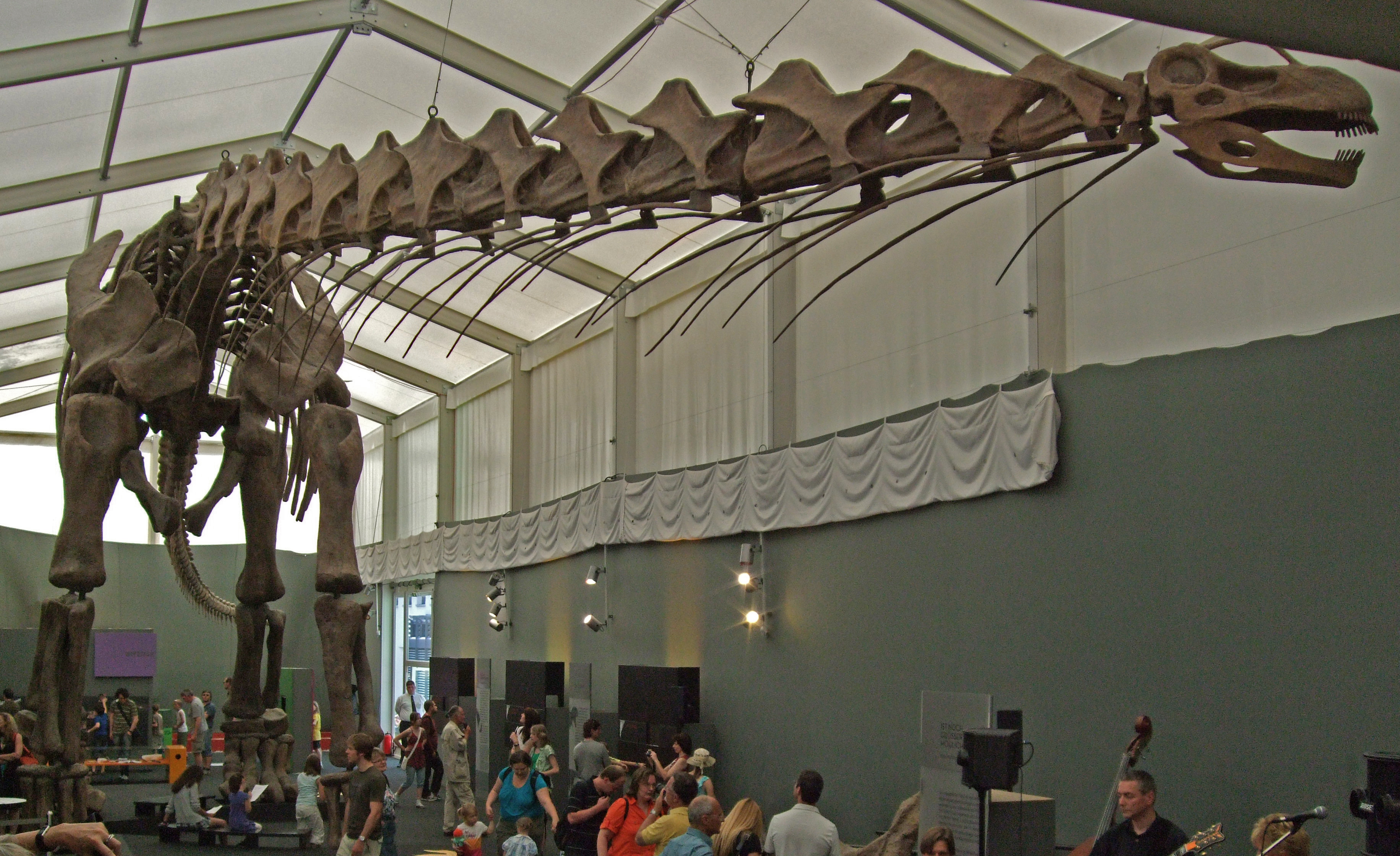
Reconstructed skeleton of the titanosaur Argentinosaurus huinculensis, often considered the heaviest dinosaur known from reasonably well-known material

While M. fragillimus as a sauropod would be relatively elongated, its enormous size still made it very massive. Weight is much more difficult to determine than length in sauropods, as the more complex equations needed are prone to greater margins of error based on smaller variations in the overall proportions of the animal. Carpenter in 2006 used Paul's 1994 estimate of the mass of Diplodocus carnegii (11.5 metric tons (11.3 long tons; 12.7 short tons)) to speculate that M. fragillimus could have weighed up to 122.4 metric tons (120.5 long tons; 134.9 short tons). The heaviest blue whale on record weighed 190 metric tons (190 long tons; 210 short tons), and the heaviest dinosaur known from reasonably good remains, Argentinosaurus, weighed 80 to 100 metric tons (79 to 98 long tons; 88 to 110 short tons), although if the size estimates can be validated, it could still be lighter than Bruhathkayosaurus, which has been estimated to have weighed 126 metric tons (124 long tons; 139 short tons), but is also known from highly fragmentary remains.

In 2019, Gregory S. Paul discovered that Calvo and Salgado's (1995) measurements of Limaysaurus tessonei were inconsistent with those of the measurements using scale bars, and ratios of bones like the humerus to the femur were higher or lower than stated. This later contributed to Carpenter 2018's estimate being smaller than expected. Thus, he estimated Maraapunisaurus at 35–40 m (115–131 ft) in length and 80–120 t (88–132 short tons) in weight. He estimates a femoral length of 3–3.5 m (9.8–11.5 ft) and a dorsal-sacral length of 7.7–9 m (25–30 ft), much longer than those of the largest titanosaurs. This is larger than Carpenter's estimation, and he stated that the known vertebra could not be plausibly accommodated within a sauropod smaller than 35 m (115 ft). He even states that Maraapunisaurus is possibly one of the largest land animal known. He also said that there was the possibility that Maraapunisaurus had more typical body proportions for a sauropod. In this case, it would be even larger than estimated, but he also says that this possibility is less likely. On the other hand, Molina-Pérez and Larramendi in 2020 estimated Maraapunisaurus at 35 m (115 ft) and 70 t (77 short tons) with a hip height of 7.7 m (25 ft), much smaller and lighter than Paul's estimation.

Nevertheless, if the recent estimations of Bruhathkayosaurus were any indication, Maraapunisaurus would have been the second largest animal to walk the earth and the fourth largest animal overall.

== Classification ==
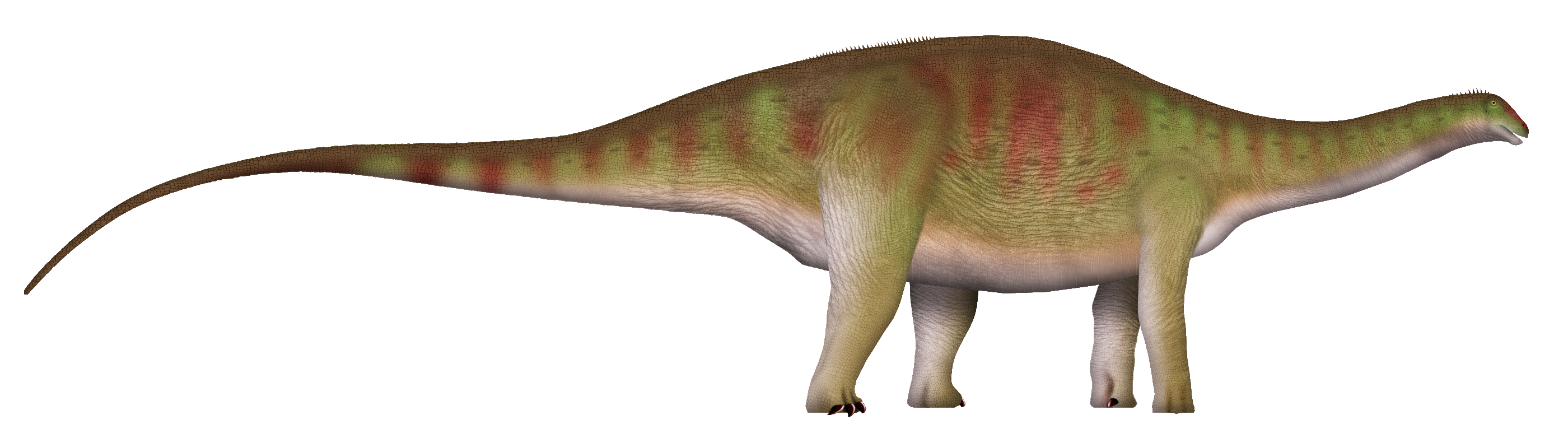
Life restoration as a rebbachisaur

In 1921, Osborn and Mook placed A. fragillimus in the family Diplodocidae. This was generally accepted until well into the twenty-first century. In 2018, Carpenter concluded from a qualitative anatomical comparison that the species was a basal member of the Rebbachisauridae, and assigned it the new name Maraapunisaurus, after a Southern Ute word maraapuni meaning "huge". The basal position would be indicated by the presence of a hyposphene, a secondary rear articulation process, which is a trait shared with the basal rebbachisaurids Histriasaurus, Comahuesaurus and Demandasaurus. Although Maraapunisaurus is older than Histriasaurus, in some ways, it is more derived than Histriasaurus as shown by the extensive pneumatisation and the tall neural arch base.

If Maraapunisaurus belongs to Rebbachisauridae, it would be the oldest member of its group known and the only one discovered from the Jurassic. The previous oldest one was Xenoposeidon. It would also be the only one from North America. Carpenter concluded that the Rebbachisauridae might have originated from that continent and only later spread to Europe; from there they would have invaded Africa and South America. The usual interpretation had been that rebbachisaurids were South American in origin, thus if Maraapunisaurus was a rebbachisaurid, the migration of the rebbachisaurids over time would be the reverse of the original interpretation.

== Paleobiology ==
In his 2006 re-evaluation, Carpenter examined the paleobiology of giant sauropods, including Maraapunisaurus, and addressed the question of why the group attained such a large size. He pointed out that gigantic sizes were reached early in sauropod evolution, with very large-sized species present as early as the late Triassic Period, and concluded that whatever evolutionary pressure caused large size was present from the early origins of the group. Carpenter cited several studies of giant mammalian herbivores, such as elephants and rhinoceros, which showed that larger size in plant-eating animals leads to greater efficiency in digesting food. Since larger animals have longer digestive systems, food is kept in digestion for significantly longer periods of time, allowing large animals to survive on lower-quality food sources. This is especially true of animals with a large number of 'fermentation chambers' along the intestine, which allow microbes to accumulate and ferment plant material, aiding digestion.

== Paleoecology ==
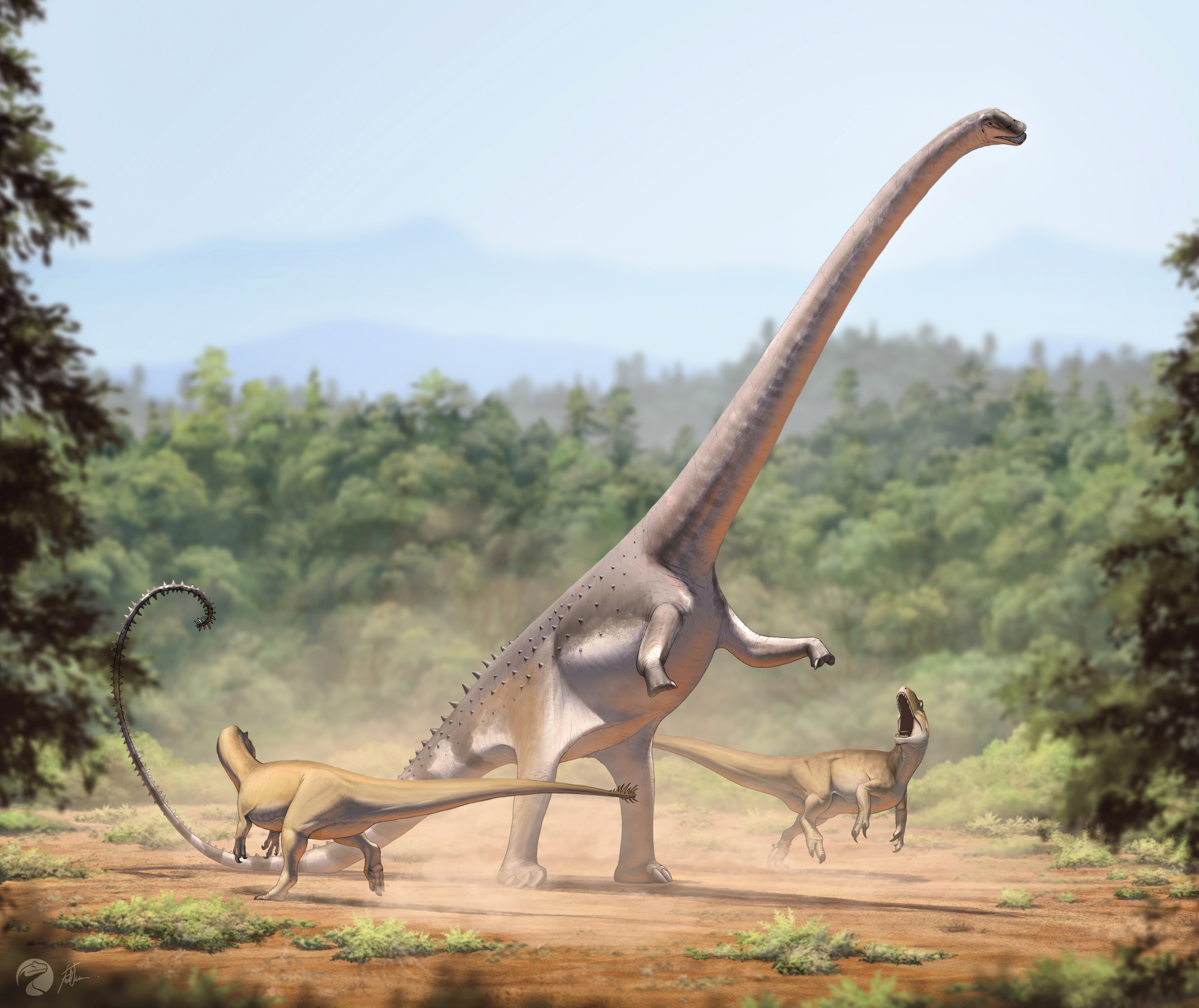
Restoration of an Allosaurus pair attacking Barosaurus in the Morrison Formation environment

Throughout their evolutionary history, sauropod dinosaurs were found primarily in semi-arid, seasonally dry environments, with a corresponding seasonal drop in the quality of food during the dry season. The environment of Maraapunisaurus was essentially a savanna, similar to the arid environments in which modern giant herbivores are found, supporting the idea that poor-quality food in an arid environment promotes the evolution of giant herbivores. Carpenter argued that other benefits of large size, such as relative immunity from predators, lower energy expenditure, and longer life span, are probably secondary advantages.

The Morrison Formation environment in which Maraapunisaurus lived would have resembled a modern savanna, though since grasses did not appear until the Late Cretaceous, ferns were probably the dominant plant and main food source for Maraapunisaurus. Though Engelmann et al. (2004) dismissed ferns as a sauropod food source due to their relatively low caloric content, Carpenter argued that the sauropod digestive system, well adapted to handle low-quality food, allows for the consumption of ferns as a large part of the sauropod diet. Carpenter also noted that the occasional presence of large petrified logs indicate the presence of 20–30 m (66–98 ft) tall trees, which would seem to conflict with the savanna comparison. However, the trees are rare, and since tall trees require more water than the savanna environment could generally provide, they probably existed in narrow tracts or "gallery forests" along rivers and gulleys where water could accumulate. Carpenter speculated that giant herbivores like Maraapunisaurus may have used the shade of the gallery forests to stay cool during the day, and done most of their feeding on the open savanna at night.

== See also ==
- Largest organisms
- Largest prehistoric animals
- Dinosaur size
- Breviparopus
- Bruhathkayosaurus
- Patagotitan
- Antarctosaurus
