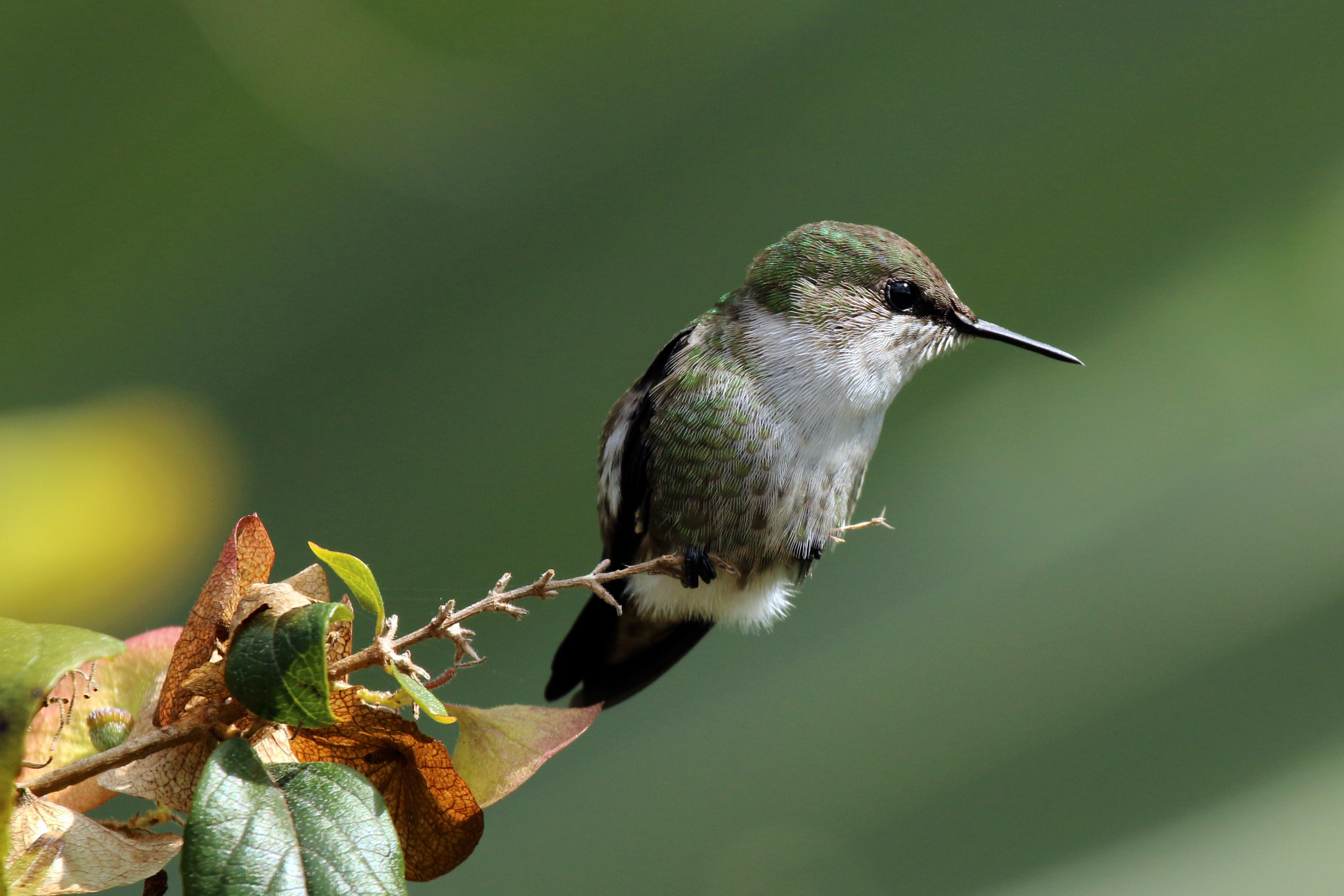
- In Jamaica

Conservation status
- Least Concern (IUCN 3.1)
- CITES Appendix II (CITES)

Scientific classification
- Kingdom: Animalia
- Phylum: Chordata
- Class: Aves
- Clade: Strisores
- Order: Apodiformes
- Family: Trochilidae
- Genus: Mellisuga
- Species: M. minima

Binomial name
- Mellisuga minima (Linnaeus, 1758)

Synonyms
- Trochilus minimus Linnaeus, 1758

= Vervain hummingbird =

Species of bird

The vervain hummingbird (Mellisuga minima) is a species of hummingbird in tribe Mellisugini of subfamily Trochilinae, the "bee hummingbirds". It is found on Hispaniola (split between the Dominican Republic and Haiti) and Jamaica.

== Taxonomy and systematics ==
The vervain hummingbird was formally described by the Swedish naturalist Carl Linnaeus in 1758 in the tenth edition of his Systema Naturae under the binomial name Trochilus minimus. Linnaeus based his description on a bird that had been described and illustrated in 1747 by the English naturalist George Edwards. The type locality is Jamaica. The vervain hummingbird is now placed together with the tiny Cuban bee hummingbird in the genus Mellisuga that was introduced by the French zoologist Mathurin Jacques Brisson in 1760.

Two subspecies of vervain hummingbird are recognised, the nominate M. m. minima (Linnaeus, 1758) and M. m. vielloti (Shaw, 1812).

== Description ==
The vervain hummingbird is perhaps the second-smallest bird in the world after the smallest, the bee hummingbird, though some other tiny ones are close to it in size. It is about 6 cm (2.4 in) long, including the 1 cm (0.39 in) bill, and weighs about 2 to 2.4 g (0.071 to 0.085 oz). The sexes are nearly alike but for their tails and the subspecies have only subtle plumage differences. All have a short, straight, dull black bill. Males are unique among hummingbirds by not having any iridescent feathering.

Males have dull metallic green uppersides that are almost black on the rump and uppertail coverts. The chin, throat, and chest are pale gray lightly spotted with darker gray; the belly and undertail coverts are dark metallic green. Its tail is entirely black and slightly forked. Females are dark metallic green to bluish green above and on the flanks. The throat is pale gray that darkens down the underparts to the vent area. The tail is rounded, not forked like the male's. The base of its central feathers are dark green and the rest of their length is black. The other tail feathers are black with varying amounts of white on their tips.

== Distribution and habitat ==
The nominate subspecies of vervain hummingbird is found on Jamaica. M. m. vielloti is found in both the Dominican Republic and Haiti on the island of Hispaniola and also smaller nearby islands. There is one sight report from Puerto Rico. The species inhabits almost every available landscape throughout its range except the interior of dense montane forest. It occurs in gallery forest, dry forest, desert scrub-shrub, gardens, and even urban areas. In elevation it ranges from sea level to at least 1,600 m (5,200 ft).

== Behavior ==
=== Movement ===
The vervain hummingbird does not migrate in the conventional sense but appears to make elevational movements in response to food availability.

=== Feeding ===
The vervain hummingbird forages for nectar at a very wide variety of flowering plants though it typically feeds at small, low-yield flowers. It does not defend feeding territories. It typically cocks its tail up when feeding. In addition to nectar, it captures small insects by hawking from a perch or by hovering in a patch of flying insects.

=== Breeding ===
Male vervain hummingbirds make what appears to be courtship display flights, a flat horizontal circle by itself or with dives between two circles. The species' breeding season spans from December to August. The female makes a tiny cup nest of soft material such as hair and plant down covered with lichen or moss; it is held together and anchored to a branch with spiderweb. Nests are typically somewhat hidden and are often within 1 m (3 ft) of the ground. The clutch is two eggs that are among the smallest of all birds', with an average length of 1 cm (0.39 in) and weighing about 0.38 g (0.013 oz). The female incubates them for 16 to 19 days and fledging occurs about 21 to 25 days after hatch.

=== Vocalization ===
Male vervain hummingbirds are highly vocal. The sing during most of the day from exposed perches in their territory and also during the courtship display and during encounters with other males. The song is complex, a mix of syllables some of which may be repeated during a song bout. The songs of the two subspecies are subtly different but the differences might be within the range of individual birds' repertoires. Both sexes make a "dry 'chittering' scolding sound" during agonistic encounters.

== Status ==
The IUCN has assessed the vervain hummingbird as being of Least Concern. It has large range, and though its population size is not known it is believed to be stable. It is widespread and uses many habitats including human-altered areas both for food and breeding. No specific threats have been identified.

== Gallery ==
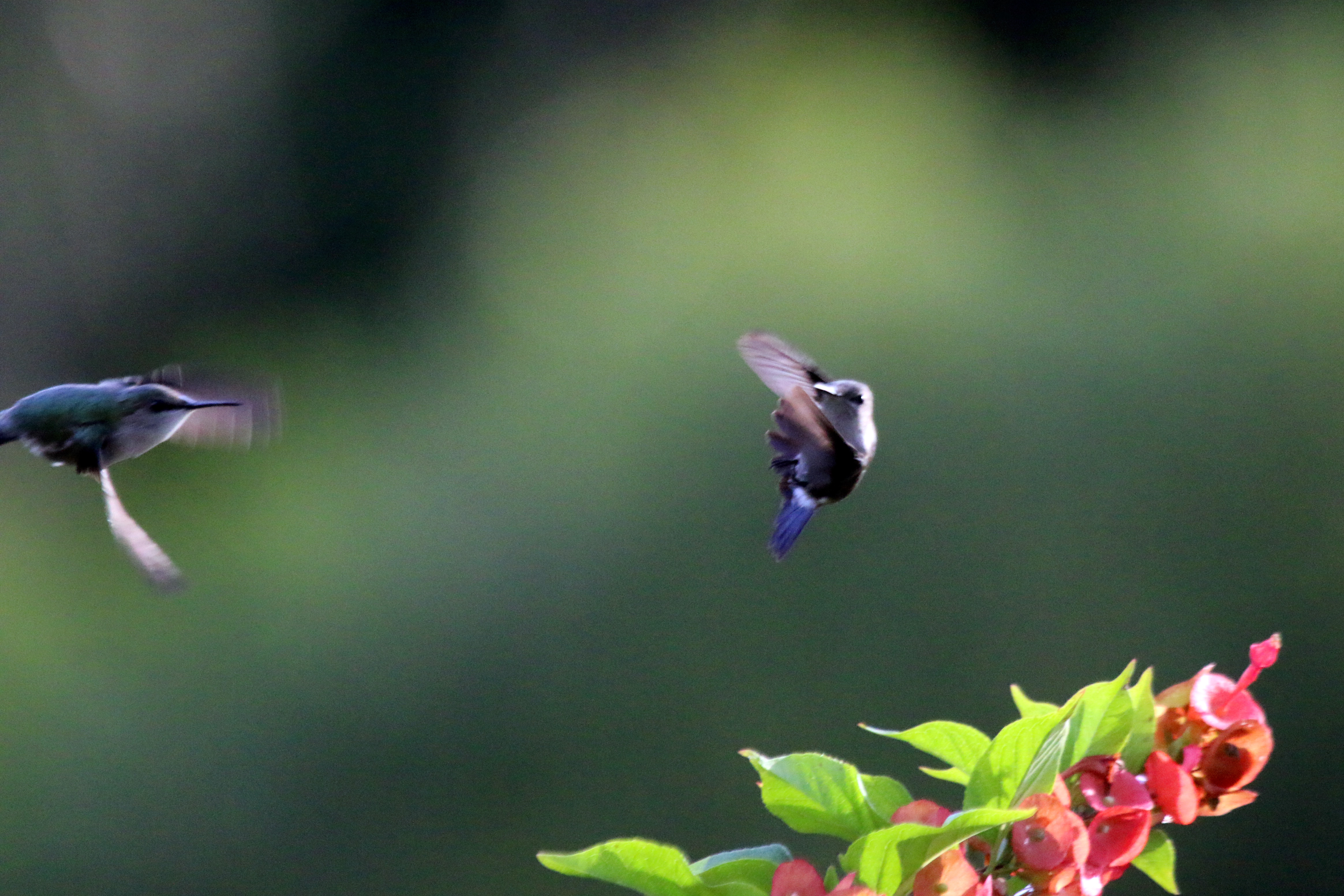
Courting, Jamaica

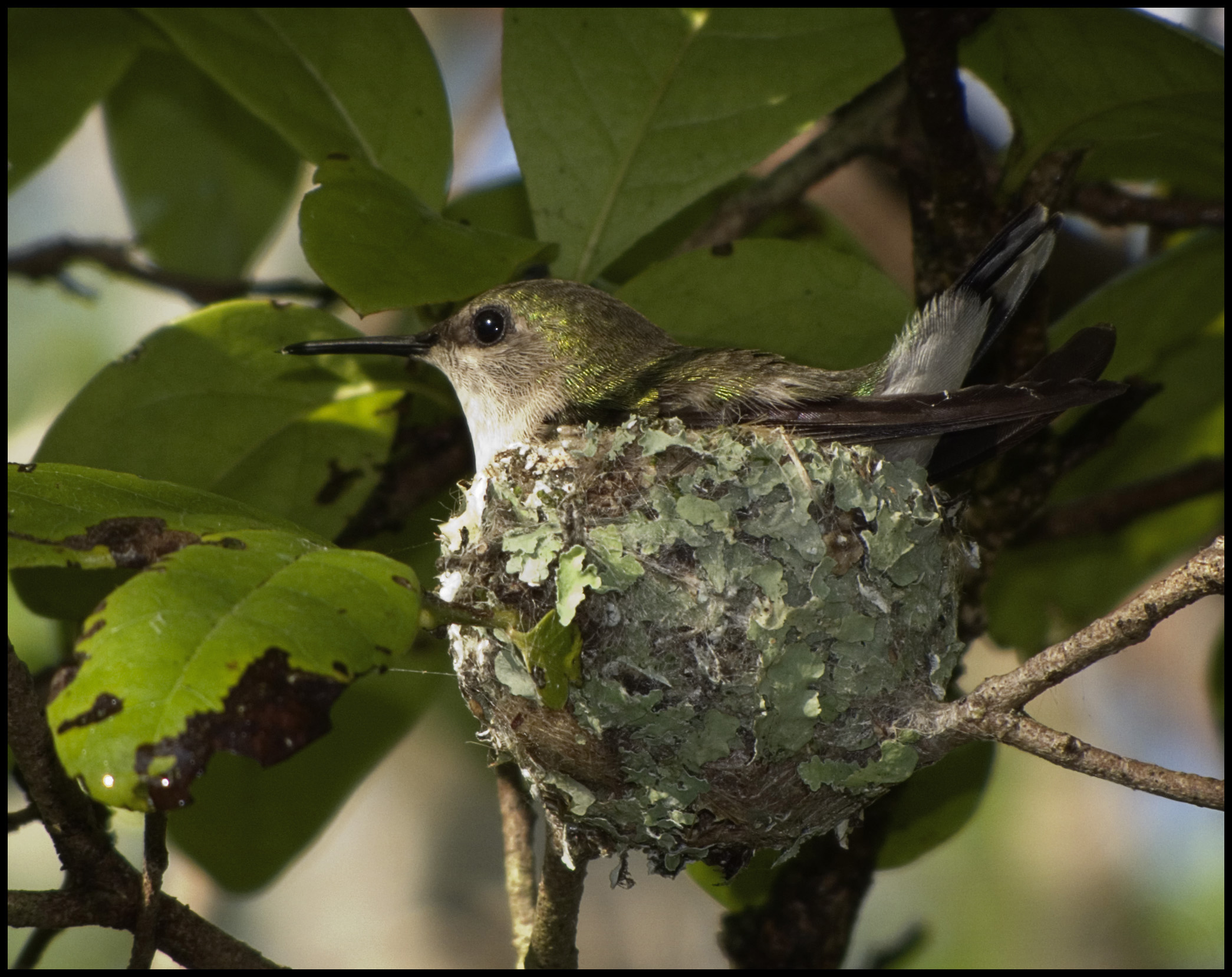
On nest

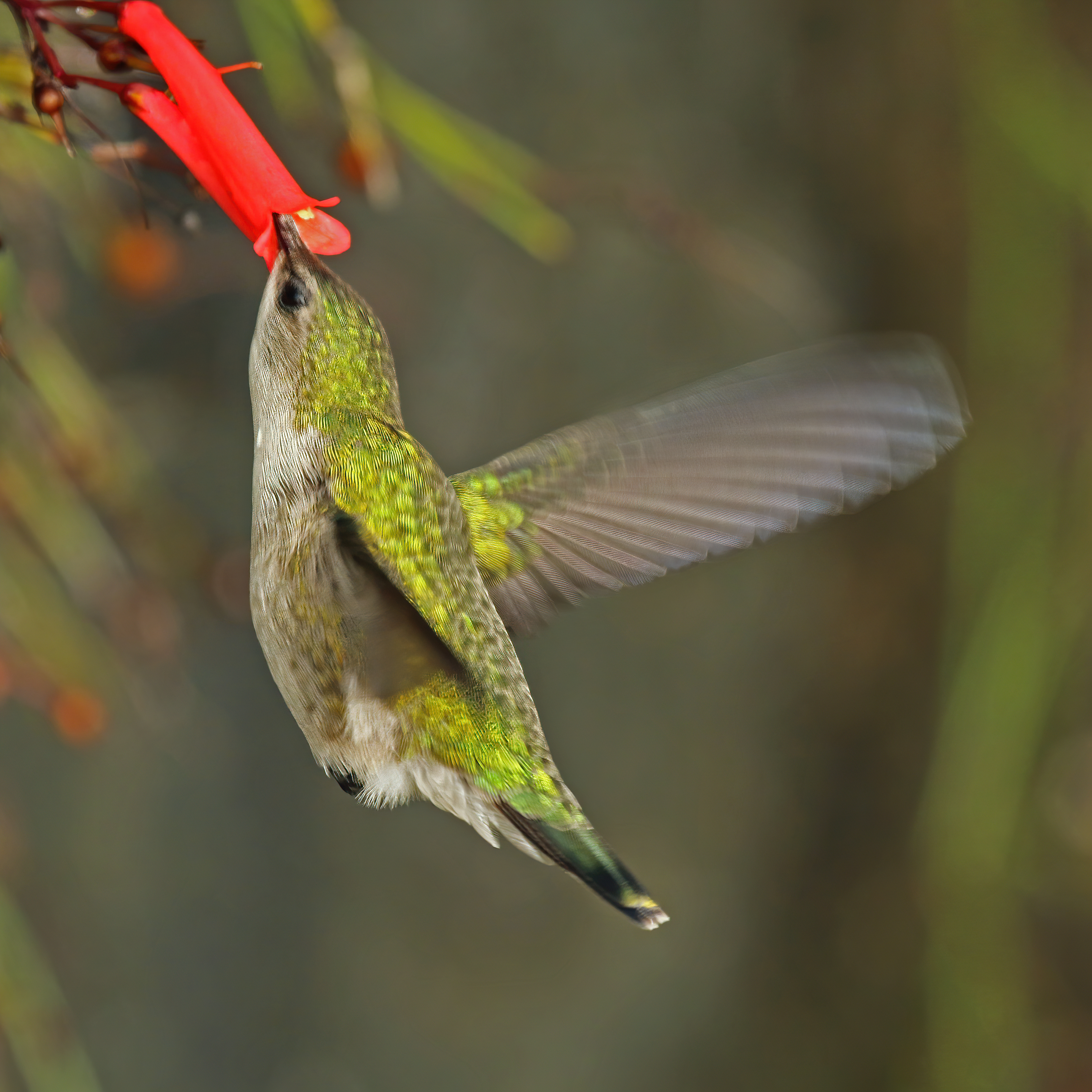
Feeding, Jamaica
