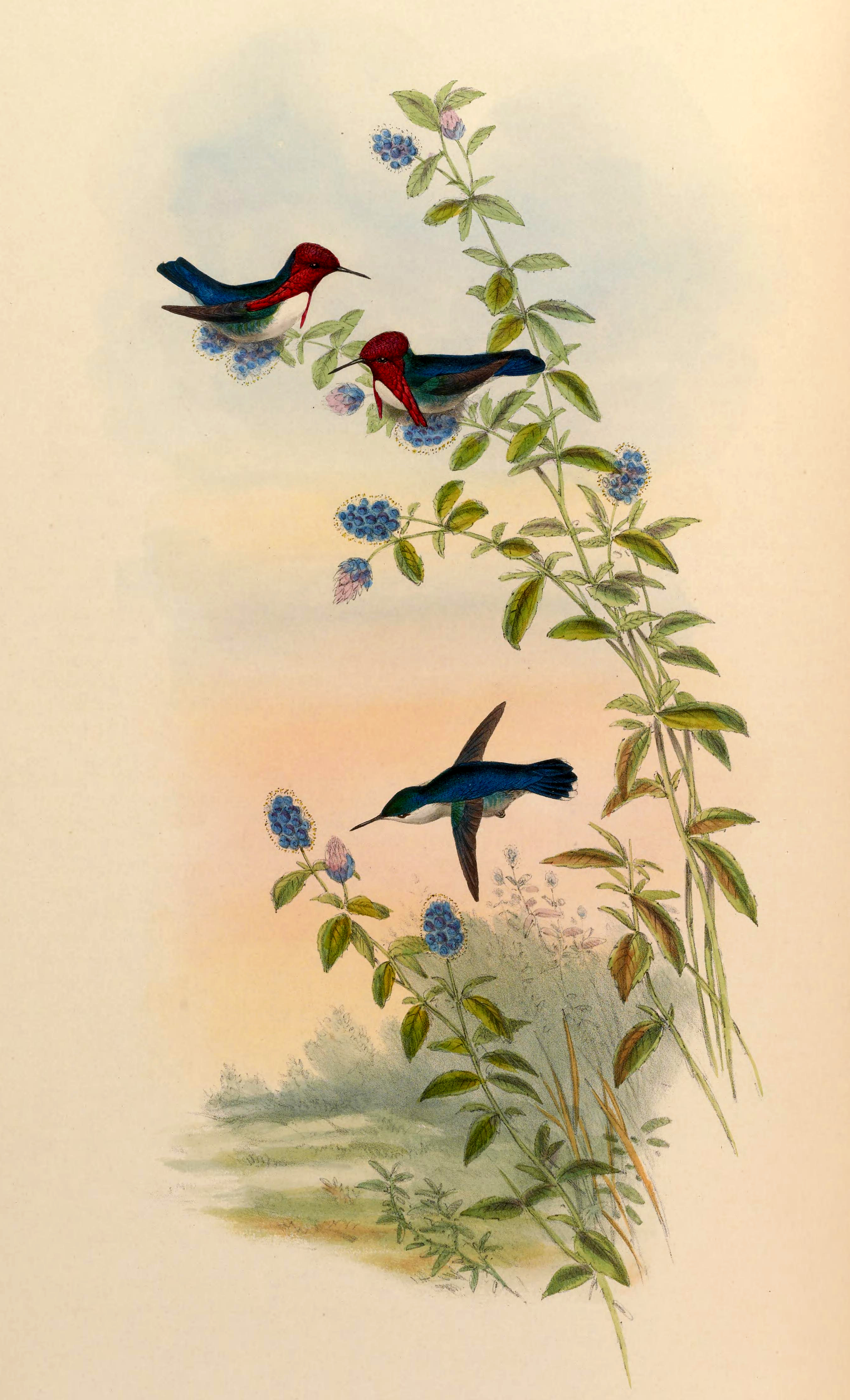
- Mellisuga helenae

Scientific classification
- Kingdom: Animalia
- Phylum: Chordata
- Class: Aves
- Order: Apodiformes
- Family: Trochilidae
- Tribe: Mellisugini
- Genus: Mellisuga; Brisson, 1760

Type species
- Trochilus minimus Linnaeus, 1758

= Mellisuga =

Genus of birds

Mellisuga is a genus of hummingbirds in the family Trochilidae. They are notable for being the first and second smallest bird species in the world.

The genus was introduced by the French zoologist Mathurin Jacques Brisson in 1760 with the vervain hummingbird as the type species. The name Mellisuga is a combination of the Latin words mel or mellis, meaning "honey" and sugere, meaning "to suck".

== Extant species ==
The genus contains two species:

Genus Mellisuga – Brisson, 1760 – two species
Common name	Scientific name and subspecies	Range	Size and ecology	IUCN status and estimated population
Bee hummingbird Male Female	Mellisuga helenae (Lembeye, 1850)	Cuba and Isla de la Juventud	Size: Habitat: Diet:	NT
Vervain hummingbird	Mellisuga minima (Linnaeus, 1758) Two subspecies: M. m. minima (Linnaeus, 1758); M. m. vielloti (Shaw, 1812)	Hispaniola (the Dominican Republic and Haiti) and Jamaica	Size: Habitat: Diet:	LC
