= Breviparopus =

Breviparopus Temporal range: See text

Trace fossil classification
- Kingdom: Animalia
- Phylum: Chordata
- Class: Reptilia
- Clade: Dinosauria
- Clade: Saurischia
- Clade: †Sauropodomorpha
- Clade: †Sauropoda
- Ichnogenus: †Breviparopus; Dutuit & Ouazzou, 1980

Type ichnospecies
- †Breviparopus taghbaloutensis Dutuit & Ouazzou, 1980

Genus of reptiles (fossil)

Breviparopus (ichnotype B. taghbaloutensis) is the name given to an ichnogenus of dinosaur, having been made by an unknown genus of sauropod. As an ichnogenus, the taxon is represented by (and named for) a 90-metre (295 ft) long series of fossil tracks, or ichnites, found in the spring of 1979 in the Atlas Mountains of present-day Morocco. At the time, this area would have been part of the splitting Gondwana supercontinent. The animal that produced the Breviparopus tracks is rumored to be one of the largest dinosaurs, though its exact size has been the subject of much debate.

== Fossil material and age ==
The combined length of the tracks of the foot and hand measured 115 centimetres (45 in), and they were 90 centimetres (35 in) in width. They are commonly dated to the Jurassic period (approximately 160–175 million years ago), though they are more likely from the early Cretaceous, roughly 130-120 million years ago. They were first described by Jean-Michel Dutuit and Achmed Ouazzou in 1980.

== Size of trackmaker ==
The size, weight, and even family tree of the animal that made Breviparopus tracks is unknown, but a great deal of speculation has arisen about this animal. Length estimates as great as 48 metres (157 ft) have been given in popular books such as Guinness World Records, though these were based on the misconception that the 115 centimetres (45 in) figure was based on a single footprint, not the combined length of the fore and hind feet.

In reality, the trackmakers of Breviparopus were likely somewhat smaller than this. The actual prints are 90 centimetres (35 in) wide and about as long. The feet were probably even larger than 90 centimetres (35 in) wide since the edges of the prints are collapsed. This would result in an animal roughly 34 to 48 metres (112 to 157 ft) long, assuming proportions similar to Giraffatitan. Earlier estimates that the prints were only 50 centimetres (20 in) wide, no larger than the feet of Diplodocus, have since been shown to be incorrect. In 2020 Molina-Pérez and Larramendi suggested that the narrow-gauge track, the position of the claws, and the era all indicate that it belonged to an enormous diplodocoid, and estimated its size at 33.5 m (110 ft) and 62 t (68 short tons).

== Taxonomy ==
Traditionally, Breviparopus has been regarded as a brachiosaur, which seemed to correspond with the fact that "Brachiosaurus" nougaredi, a brachiosaur known from a colossal sacrum, was discovered not too far from Morocco, in Early Cretaceous deposits in Wargla, Algeria. Since no actual bones of Breviparopus have been identified, it is difficult to say with certainty whether the tracks were made by a diplodocid, titanosaur or brachiosaur. All that can be said for certain, according to Michel Monbaron and colleagues, is that Breviparopus is quite distinct from the prints made by Atlasaurus. However, the presence of a small medially directed thumb-claw print makes it likely the animal was a brachiosaur, since they have small thumb claws at ground level (as opposed to diplodocids and camarasaurids, whose thumb metacarpals are short and hold their thumb claws off the ground), and the narrow-gauge stance also fits with a brachiosaur body shape - in the Early Cretaceous, the dominant sauropods were wide-bodied titanosaurs, and deep-bodied brachiosaurs which had more narrowly spaced legs - therefore the narrow gauge of the Breviparopus prints favors a brachiosaurid diagnosis (this seems to be corroborated by the sacrum of Brachiosaurus nougaredi, which is unusually narrow for its length even by brachiosaur standards). It is also worth noting that the bone fossil record from the Middle Jurassic, according to C.A. Meyer is rather more incomplete and fragmented than the fossil record of dinosaur tracks.

== See also ==
- List of dinosaur ichnogenera
- Maraapunisaurus, another gigantic sauropod
- Largest prehistoric animals
- Dinosaur size
