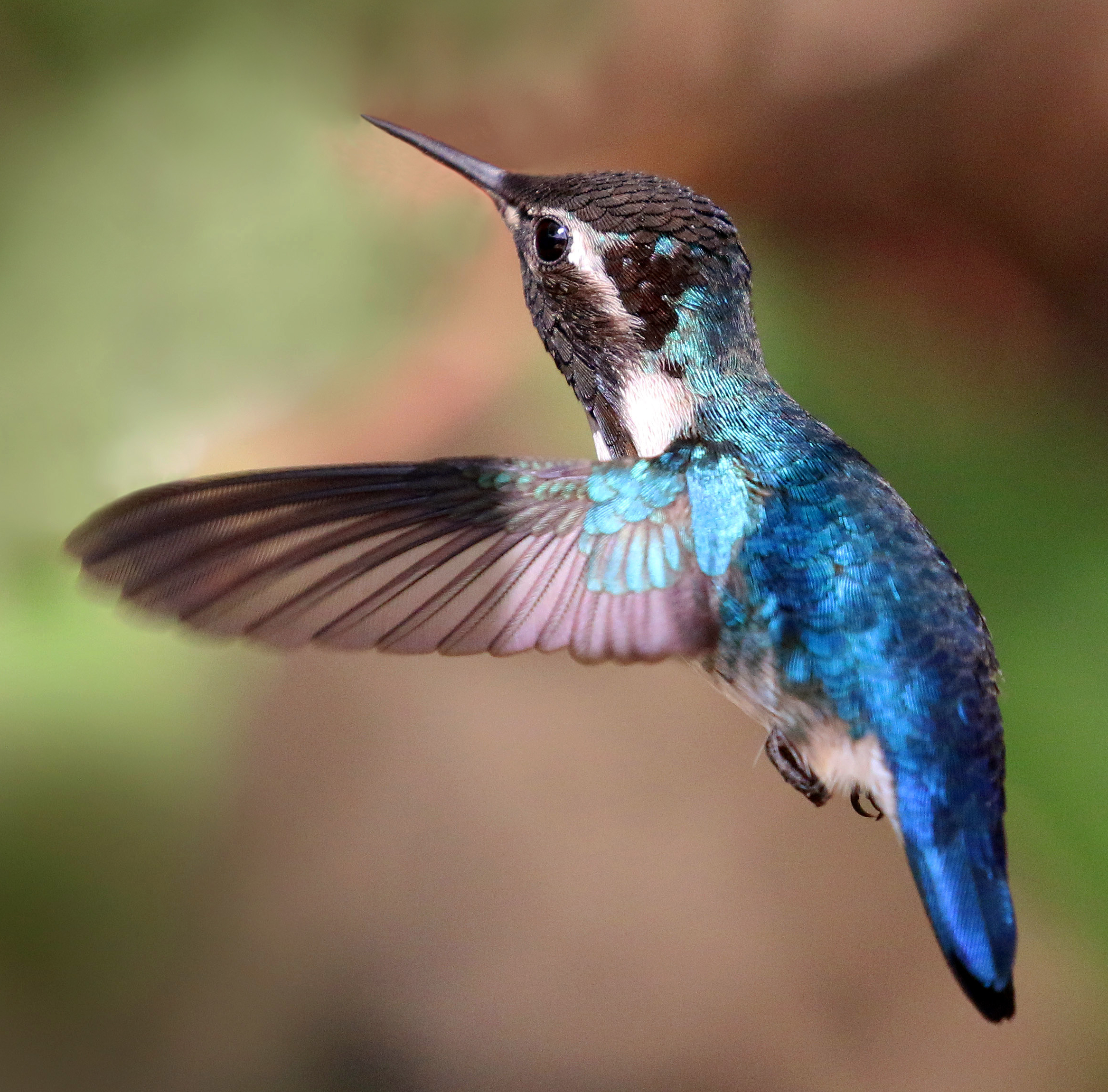
- Male in flight
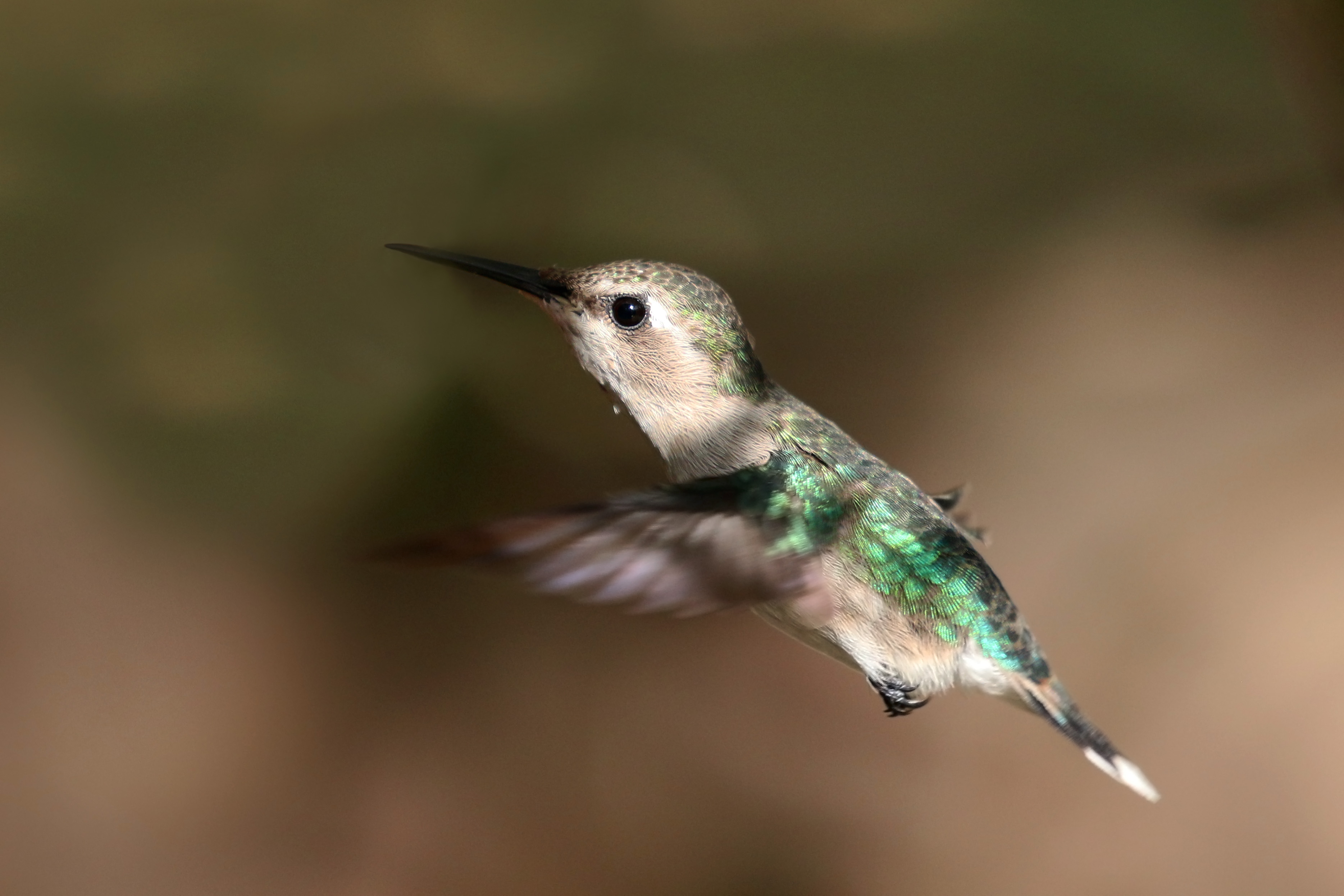
- Female in flight

Conservation status
- Near Threatened (IUCN 3.1)
- CITES Appendix II

Scientific classification
- Kingdom: Animalia
- Phylum: Chordata
- Class: Aves
- Order: Apodiformes
- Family: Trochilidae
- Genus: Mellisuga
- Species: M. helenae

Binomial name
- Mellisuga helenae (Lembeye, 1850)

= Bee hummingbird =

Smallest species of bird

The bee hummingbird, zunzuncito or Helena hummingbird (Mellisuga helenae) is a species of hummingbird, native to the island of Cuba in the Caribbean. It is the smallest known bird. The bee hummingbird feeds on flower nectar and insects.

== Description ==
The bee hummingbird is the smallest living bird. Females weigh 2.6 g (0.092 oz) and are 6.1 cm (2 3/8 in) long, and are slightly larger than males, which have an average weight of 1.95 g (0.069 oz) and length of 5.5 cm (2 1/8 in). Like all hummingbirds, it is a swift, strong flier.

The male has a green pileum and bright red throat, an iridescent scarlet gorget (when exposed to sunlight) with elongated lateral plumes, bluish upper parts, and the rest of the underparts are mostly greyish white. Compared to other small hummingbirds, which often have a slender appearance, the bee hummingbird looks rounded and plump.

Female bee hummingbirds are bluish green with a pale gray underside. The tips of their tail feathers have white spots. During the mating season, males have a reddish to pink head, chin, and throat. The female lays only two eggs at a time, each about the size of a coffee bean.

The bee hummingbird's feathers have iridescent colors, which are not always noticeable, but depend on the viewing angle. The bird's slender, pointed bill is adapted for probing deep into flowers. The bee hummingbird feeds mainly on nectar, by moving its tongue rapidly in and out of its mouth. In the process of feeding, the bird picks up pollen on its bill and head. When it flies from flower to flower, it transfers the pollen. In this way, it plays an important role in plant reproduction. In one day, the bee hummingbird may visit 1,500 flowers. It is a diurnal bird that can fly at 40–48 km/h (22–26 kn; 11–13 m/s), and it beats its wings 80–200 times per second, which allows it to remain stationary in the air to feed on flowers. The bee hummingbird lives up to seven years in the wild, and 10 years in captivity.

The bee hummingbird has also been described as the smallest known dinosaur. This characterization is based upon the recognition that birds are a living form of theropod dinosaurs (or, strictly speaking, avian dinosaurs), and no smaller bird or non-avian dinosaur has been found in the fossil record.

The call is described as a "high pitched, jumbled twitter". Within their territory a male will often sing atop the highest tree.

Size of M. helenae compared to a human hand

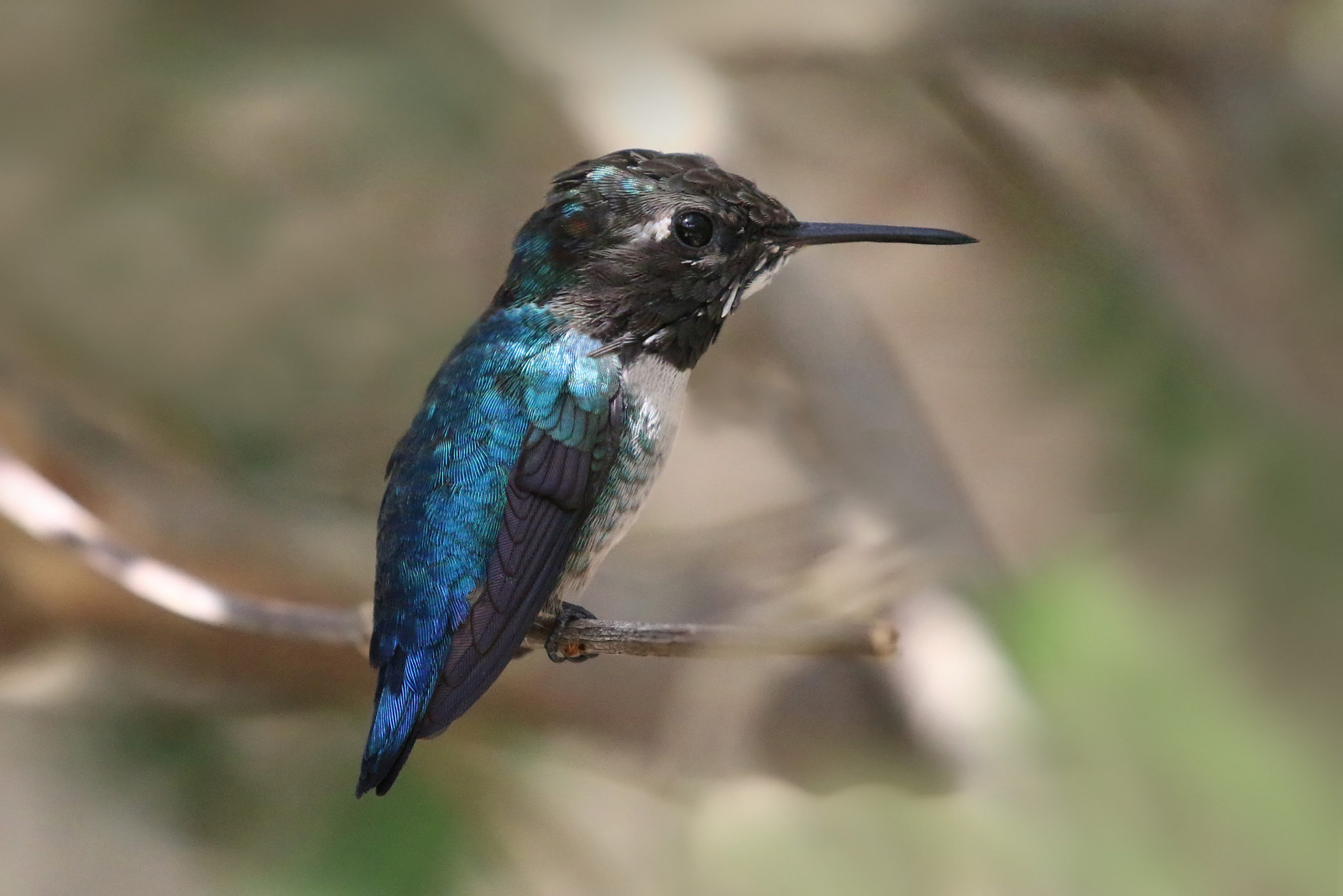
Adult male, Cuba

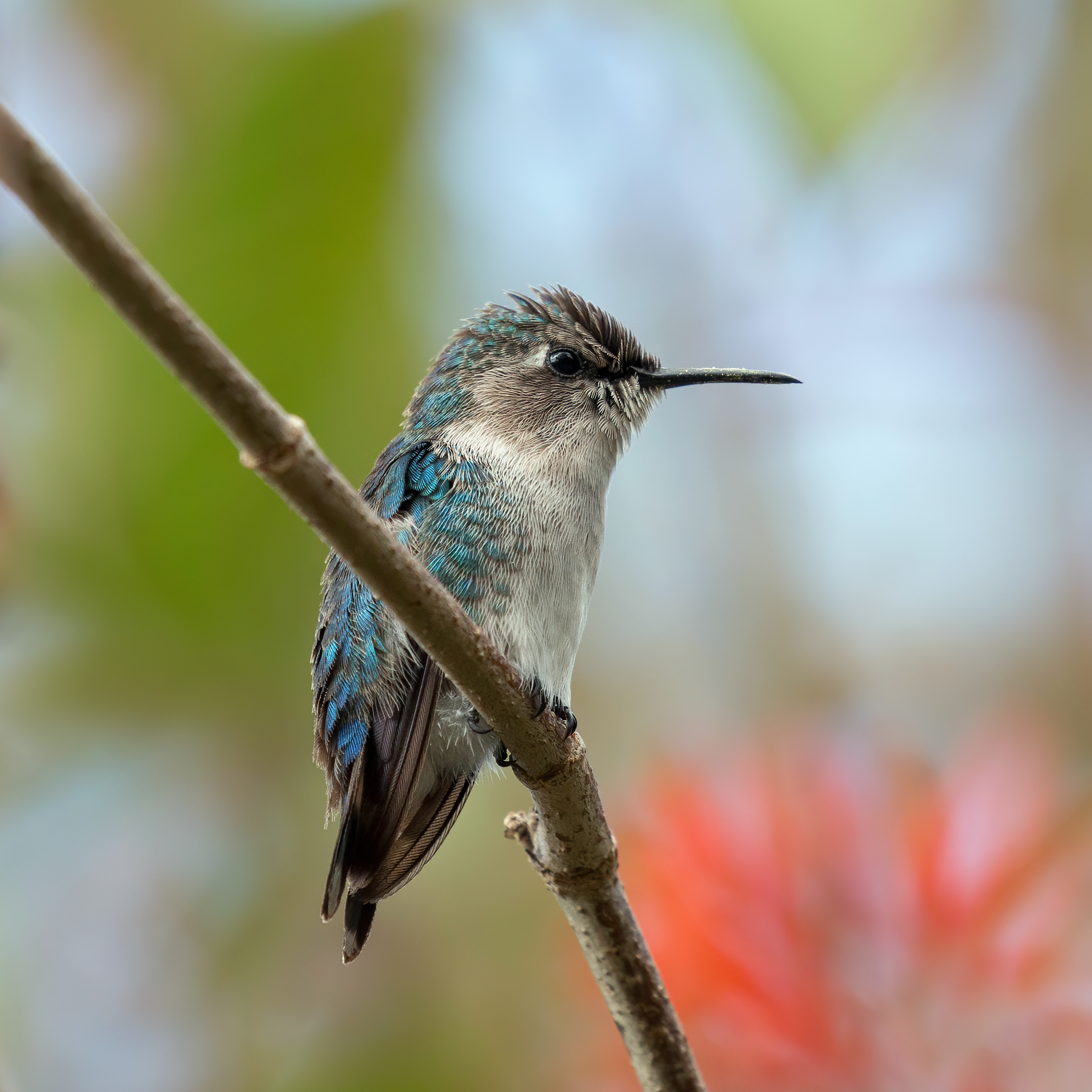
Juvenile male

== Diet ==
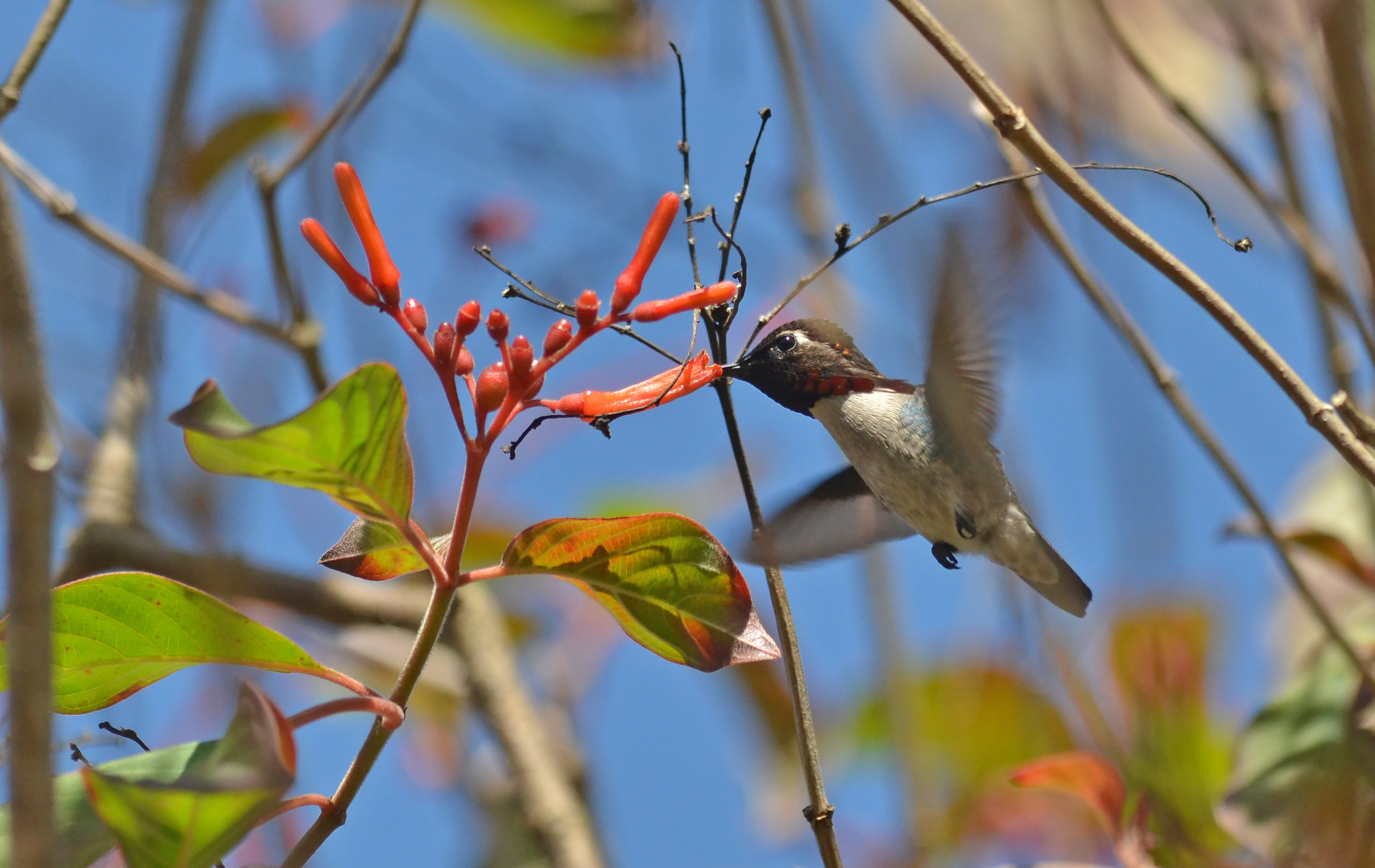
Bee hummingbird feeding on Hamelia patens

The bee hummingbird has been reported to visit ten plant species, nine of them native to Cuba.

Plant Name	Picture
Hamelia patens (Rubiaceae)	Picture of hamelia patens
Chrysobalanus icaco (Chrysobalanaceae)	Picture of chrysobalanus icaco
Pavonia paludicola (Malvaceae)	Picture of pavonia paludicola
Forsteronia corymbosa (Apocynaceae)	Picture of forsteronia corymbosa
Lysiloma latisiliquum (Mimosaceae)	
Turnera ulmifolia (Passifloraceae)	Picture of turnera ulmifolia
Antigonon leptopus (Polygonaceae)	Picture of antigonon leptopus
Clerodendrum aculeatum (Verbenaceae)	
Tournefortia hirsutissima (Boraginaceae)	Picture of tournefortia hirsutissima
Cissus obovata (Vitaceae)	

They occasionally eat insects and spiders. In a typical day, bee hummingbirds will consume up to half their body weight in food.

== Taxonomy ==
The closest evolutionary relative of the bee hummingbird is the vervain hummingbird (Mellisuga minima), the only other member of its genus. The habitats of the vervain hummingbird are in Cuba's neighboring islands, Hispaniola and Jamaica.

== Habitat and distribution ==
The bee hummingbird is endemic to the entire Cuban archipelago, including the main island of Cuba and the Isla de la Juventud in the West Indies. In these regions bee hummingbirds generally live in areas of thick growth that contain lianas and epiphytes. Its population is fragmented; it is found in Cuba's mogote areas in Pinar del Río Province and more commonly in Zapata Swamp (Matanzas Province) and in eastern Cuba, with reference localities in Alexander Humboldt National Park and Baitiquirí Ecological Reserve (Guantánamo Province) and Gibara and Sierra Cristal (Holguín Province).

== Breeding ==
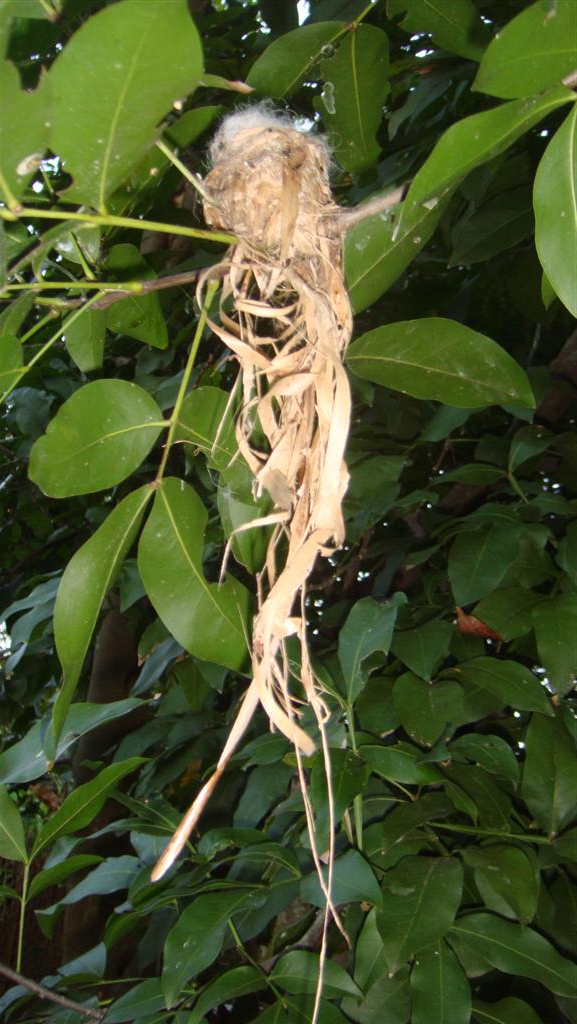
Side view of the nest

Bee hummingbirds reach sexual maturity at one year of age. The bee hummingbird's breeding season is March–June, with the female laying one or two eggs.

Using strands of cobwebs, bark, and lichen, female bee hummingbirds build a cup-shaped nest about 2.5 cm (1 in) in diameter and 3–5 m (9.8–16.4 ft) off the ground. The nest is lined with a layer of soft plant wool. Branches in mature, leafy jucaro (Terminalia buceras) and juvenile ocuje (Calophyllum antillanum) trees are commonly used for nest building. After completion of the nest, the eggs are incubated for 21 days by only the female, followed by 2 days of hatching, and 18 days of care by the mother. During days of care the mother will hunt for small insects while chicks are left alone in the nest. Over the final 4–5 days of care, juvenile bee hummingbirds practice their flight capabilities. The nests are used only once.

== Coevolution with flowers ==
The bee hummingbird's interaction with the flowers that supply nectar is a notable example of bird–plant coevolution with its primary food source (flowers for nectar). Flowers that bee hummingbirds often feed from are odorless, have long narrow tubular corolla that are brightly colored, and have dilute nectar.

== See also ==
- Dinosaur size
- Smallest organisms
