= Dinosaur size =

Dinosaur mass and length estimates

Scale diagram comparing a human and the longest-known dinosaurs of five major clades

Size is an important aspect of dinosaur paleontology, of interest to both the general public and professional scientists. Dinosaurs show some of the most extreme variations in size of any land animal group, ranging from the bee hummingbird, weighing just three grams, to the extinct titanosaurs, such as Argentinosaurus and Bruhathkayosaurus, which could weigh as much as 50–130 t (55–143 short tons).

Scale diagram comparing a human hand to the bee hummingbird, the smallest known dinosaur

The latest evidence suggests that dinosaurs' average size varied through the Triassic, early Jurassic, late Jurassic and Cretaceous periods, and dinosaurs probably only became widespread during the early or mid Jurassic. Predatory theropod dinosaurs, which occupied most terrestrial carnivore niches during the Mesozoic, most often fall into the 100–1,000 kg (220–2,200 lb) category when sorted by estimated weight into categories based on order of magnitude, whereas recent predatory carnivoran mammals peak in the range of 10–100 kg (22–220 lb). The mode of Mesozoic dinosaur body masses is between one and ten metric tonnes. This contrasts sharply with the size of Cenozoic mammals, estimated by the National Museum of Natural History as about 2 to 5 kg (4.4 to 11.0 lb).

== History of study ==
When the British paleontologist Richard Owen first coined the name Dinosauria in 1842, he made note of the size of the "gigantic Crocodile-lizards of dry land". He believed that Megalosaurus was 9.1 m (30 ft) long and built like large modern mammals, larger than any other known saurian.

== Estimation methods ==
Scientists will probably never be certain of the largest and smallest dinosaurs. This is because only a small fraction of animals ever fossilize, and most of these remains will likely never be uncovered. Of the specimens that are recovered, few are even relatively complete skeletons, and impressions of skin and other soft tissues are rarely discovered. Rebuilding a complete skeleton by comparing the size and morphology of bones to those of similar, better-known species is an inexact art (though governed by some established allometric trends), and reconstructing the muscles and other organs of the living animal is, at best, a process of educated guesswork, and never perfect. Mass estimates for dinosaurs are much more variable than length estimates given the lack of soft tissue preservation in the fossilization process. Modern mass estimation is often done with the laser scan skeleton technique that puts a "virtual" skin over the known or implied skeleton, but the limitations inherent in previous mass estimation techniques remain.

== Body size by group ==
=== Sauropodomorphs ===
Size comparison of selected giant sauropod dinosaurs

Sauropodomorph size is difficult to estimate given their usually fragmentary state of preservation. Sauropods are often preserved without their tails, so the margin of error in overall length estimates is high. Mass is calculated using the cube of the length, so for species in which the length is particularly uncertain, the weight is even more so. Estimates that are particularly uncertain (due to very fragmentary or lost material) are preceded by a question mark. Each number represents the highest estimate of a given research paper. One large sauropod, Maraapunisaurus fragillimus, was based on particularly scant remains that have been lost since their description by paleontologists in 1878. Analysis of the illustrations included in the original report suggested that M. fragillimus may have been the largest land animal of all time, possibly weighing 100–150 t (110–170 short tons) and measuring between 40–60 m (130–200 ft) long. One later analysis of the surviving evidence, and the biological plausibility of such a large land animal, suggested that the enormous size of this animal was an over-estimate due partly to typographical errors in the original report. This would later be challenged by a different study, which argued Cope's measurements were genuine and that there was no basis for assuming typographical errors. The study, however, also reclassified the species and correspondingly gave a much lower length estimate of 30.3 metres (99 ft) and a mass of 78.5 t (86.5 short tons). This in itself would later be disputed as being too small for an animal of such size, with some believing it to be even larger at around 35–40 metres (115–131 ft) and weighing around 80–120 t (88–132 short tons).

Another large but even more controversial sauropod is Bruhathkayosaurus, which had a calculated weight ranging between 126–220 t (139–243 short tons) and a length of 44.1 m (145 ft) Although the existence of this sauropod had long been dismissed as a potential fake or a misidentification of a petrified tree trunk, recent photographic evidence emerged, confirming its existence. More recent and reliable estimates in 2023 have rescaled Bruhathkayosaurus to weigh around 110–130 t (120–140 short tons) with its most liberal estimate being 240 t (260 short tons), making it incredibly massive for such an animal. If the upper unlikely size estimates were to be taken at face value, Bruhathkayosaurus would not only be the largest dinosaur to have ever lived, but also the largest animal to have lived, exceeding even the largest blue whale recorded. According to Gregory S. Paul, 'super-sauropods' or 'land-whales' such as Maraapunisaurus, Bruhathkayosaurus and the "Broome Titanosaur footprints," as he calls them, should not be surprising as sauropods were more heat tolerant and grew rapidly, which allowed them to reach truly titanic sizes that rivalled the largest whales in mass despite the prevalence of air sacs. Moreover, in a 2024 publication, Gregory S. Paul further argued that a sauropod's internal air sacs were not as dramatically density reducing as has been widely thought, suggesting that masses reaching close to 200 tons was within the realm of possibility. In fact, a sauropod's r-selection reproduction combined with the positive feedback loop of needing longer necks to feed a growing fermentation factory of its digestive organs, allowed adult sauropods to balloon up in size when compared to their mammalian contemporaries, as a mammal's K-selected reproduction would have limited adult sizes to avoid the overexploitation of their habitat's food resources, something sauropods lacked entirely. Other potential factors for such extreme sauropod sizes include increasing bone robustness and load-distributing cartilaginous features to better redistribute and support such massive weights.

Generally, the giant sauropods can be divided into two categories: the shorter but stockier and more massive forms (mainly titanosaurs and some brachiosaurids), and the longer but slenderer and more light-weight forms (mainly diplodocids).

Because different methods of estimation sometimes give conflicting results, mass estimates for sauropods can vary widely causing disagreement among scientists over the accurate number. For example, the titanosaur Dreadnoughtus was originally estimated to weigh 59.3 tonnes by the allometric scaling of limb-bone proportions, whereas more recent estimates, based on three-dimensional reconstructions, yield a much smaller figure of 22.1–38.2 tonnes.

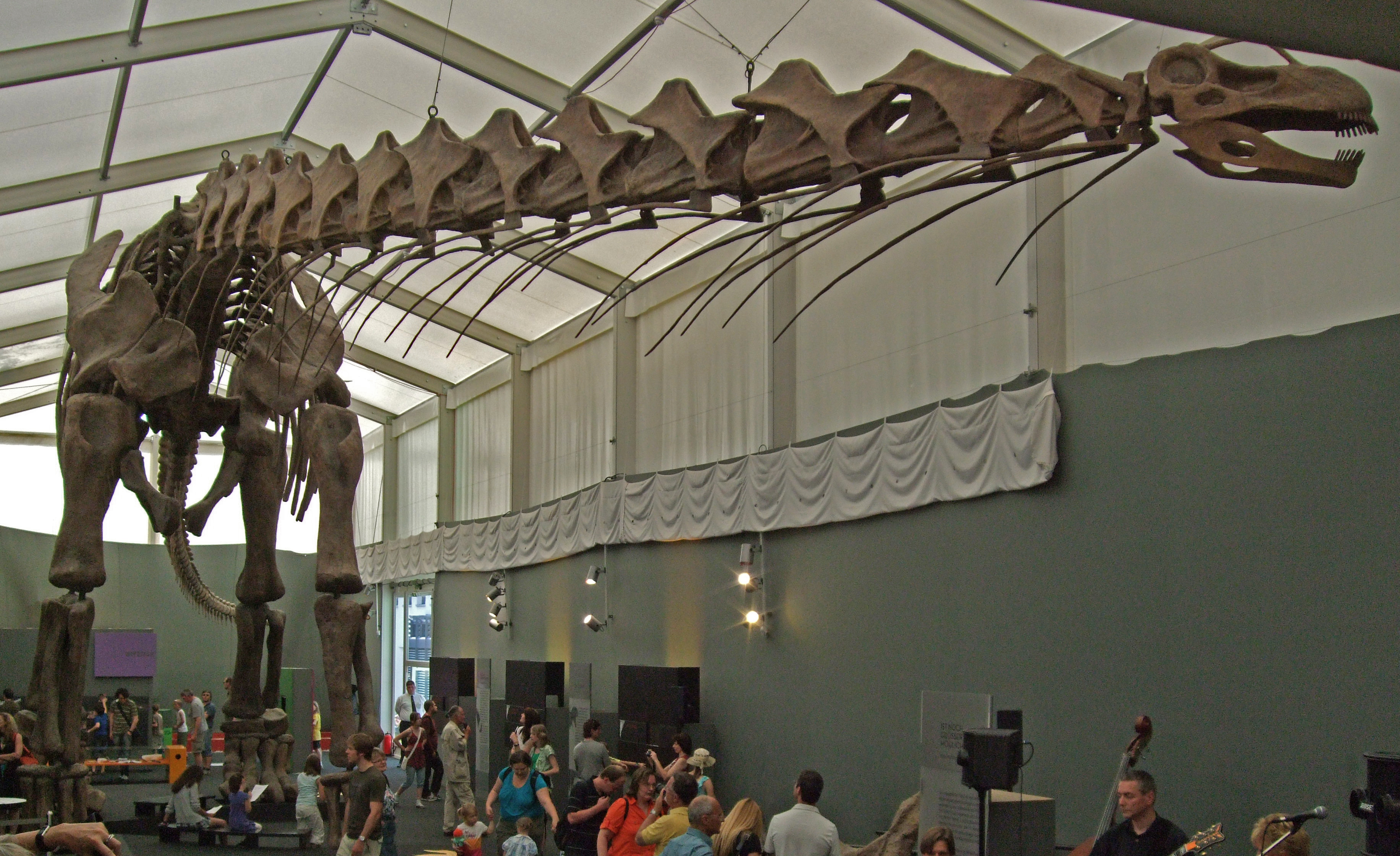
Reconstructed skeleton of the titanosaur Argentinosaurus huinculensis, often considered the largest-known dinosaur

The sauropods were the longest and heaviest dinosaurs. For much of the dinosaur era, the smallest sauropods were larger than almost anything else in their habitat, and the largest were an order of magnitude more massive than anything else known to have walked the Earth since. Giant prehistoric mammals such as Paraceratherium and Palaeoloxodon (the largest land mammals ever discovered) were dwarfed by the giant sauropods, and only modern whales approach or surpass them in weight, though they live in the oceans. There are several proposed advantages for the large size of sauropods, including protection from predation, reduction of energy use, and longevity, but it may be that the most important advantage was dietary. Large animals are more efficient at digestion than small animals, because food spends more time in their digestive systems. This also permits them to subsist on food with lower nutritive value than smaller animals. Sauropod remains are mostly found in rock formations interpreted as dry or seasonally dry, and the ability to eat large quantities of low-nutrient browse would have been advantageous in such environments.

One of the tallest and heaviest dinosaurs known from good skeletons is Giraffatitan brancai (previously classified as a species of Brachiosaurus). Its remains were discovered in Tanzania between 1907 and 1912. Bones from several similar-sized individuals were incorporated into the skeleton now mounted and on display at the Museum für Naturkunde Berlin; this mount is 12–13.27 metres (39.4–43.5 ft) tall and 21.8–22.5 metres (72–74 ft) long, and would have belonged to an animal that weighed between 30,000 to 60,000 kilograms (66,000 to 132,000 lb). One of the longest complete dinosaurs is the 27-metre-long (89 ft) Diplodocus, which was discovered in Wyoming in the United States and displayed in Pittsburgh's Carnegie Natural History Museum in 1907.

There were larger dinosaurs, but knowledge of them is based entirely on a small number of fragmentary fossils. Most of the largest herbivorous specimens on record were discovered in the 1970s or later, and include the massive titanosaur Argentinosaurus huinculensis, which is the largest dinosaur known from uncontroversial and relatively substantial evidence, estimated to have been 70–80 t (77–88 short tons) and 36 m (118 ft) long. Some of the longest sauropods were those with exceptionally long, whip-like tails, such as the 29–30 m (95–98 ft) Diplodocus hallorum (formerly Seismosaurus) and the 39 m Supersaurus.

In 2014, the fossilized remains of a previously unknown species of sauropod were discovered in Argentina. The titanosaur, named Patagotitan mayorum, was estimated to have been around 40 m (130 ft) long weighing around 77 t (85 short tons), larger than any other previously found sauropod. The specimens found were remarkably complete, significantly more so than previous titanosaurs. It has since been suggested that Patagotitan was not necessarily larger than Argentinosaurus and Puertasaurus. In 2019, Patagotitan was estimated to have been 31 metres (102 ft) long and about 55 tonnes (121,000 lb).

The largest of non-sauropod sauropodomorphs was the 16 metres (52 ft) long 10 tonnes (22,000 lb) unnamed Elliot giant. Another large sauropodomorph was Euskelosaurus. It reached 12.2 m (40 ft) in length and 2 t (2.2 short tons) in weight. Yunnanosaurus youngi also reached a length of 13 m (43 ft).

=== Theropods ===
Size comparison of selected giant theropod dinosaurs

Tyrannosaurus was for many decades the largest and best-known theropod to the general public. Since its discovery, however, a number of other, comparably-sized giant carnivorous dinosaurs have been described, including Spinosaurus, Carcharodontosaurus, and Giganotosaurus. These large theropod dinosaurs are estimated to have exceeded Tyrannosaurus in length, though more recent studies and reconstructions show that Tyrannosaurus, although shorter, was more heavily built and thus still comparable to them in mass and overall size. The largest known Tyrannosaurus specimens such as Sue and Scotty are currently estimated to be the most massive individual theropod specimens known to science, though by only a narrow margin; a considerable bias in sample size resulting from the much greater number of adult specimens in Tyrannosaurus compared to all other theropods of similar mass, combined with the majority of individual adult giant theropods (even with Tyrannosaurus) never having entered the fossil record, mean it is difficult to judge which, if any, of these theropods was the largest by mass in reality. There is still no clear explanation for exactly why giant theropods grew to be so massive compared to any land predators that came before and after them.

The largest extant theropod (avian dinosaur) is the common ostrich, up to 2.74 metres (9 ft 0 in) tall and weighs between 63.5 and 145.15 kilograms (140.0 and 320.0 lb).

The smallest non-avialan theropod known from adult specimens may be Anchiornis huxleyi, at 110 grams (3.9 ounces) in weight and 34 centimetres (13 in) in length, although later studies discovered a larger specimen reaching 62 centimetres (24 in). However, some studies suggest that Anchiornis was actually an avialan. The smallest dinosaur known from adult specimens which is definitely not an avialan is Parvicursor remotus, at 162 grams (5.7 oz) and measuring 39 centimetres (15 in) long. However, in 2022 its holotype was recognized as a juvenile individual. The smallest known theropod, is the currently extant bee hummingbird at 6.12 cm long and 2.6g for females, and 5.51 cm long and 3.25g for the males., which is also the smallest known dinosaur.

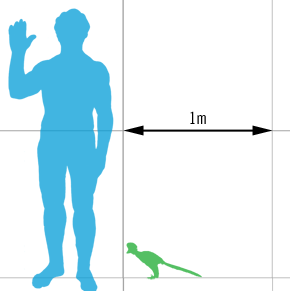
Size of Anchiornis, the smallest potentially non-avialan dinosaur.

In the theropod lineage leading to birds, body size shrank continuously over a period of 50 million years, from an average of 163 kilograms (359 lb) down to 0.8 kg (1.8 lb). This was the only dinosaur lineage to get continuously smaller over such an extended time period, and their skeletons developed adaptations at about four times the average rate for dinosaurs.

=== Ornithischians ===
Size comparisons of the largest ornithopods.

The largest of ornithischians is the hadrosaur Shantungosaurus from the province of Shandong, China, measuring at least 15 meters (49 feet) in length and weighed at least 13 tonnes (14 short tonnes). Magnapaulia, another hadrosaur from Mexico, has the most recent estimate placing the animal's size at 12.5 meters (approximately 41 feet) long and weighed 9.77 tonnes (10.77 short tons).

Other large ornithischians include:

- Triceratops: a large ceratopsian, and the most famous of its kind, measuring somewhere between 8-9 meters (26-30 feet) and weighing 6-10 tonnes (6.6-11 short tons). Animals of similar size include Torosaurus, Eotriceratops, and the controversial Titanoceratops.
- Ankylosaurus: a large ankylosaur, one of the most armoured animals ever, and possibly the largest of all ankylosaurids, with a length of 8 meters (26 feet), and a weight of 7.95 tonnes (8.76 short tons). Other ankylosaurs barely reach any longer than 6 meters (20 feet) in length.
- Dacentrurus and Stegosaurus: The most recent estimates for Dacentrurus make the animal 8-9 meters in length and 5-7.4 tonnes (5.5-8.2 short tons). However, a specimen of Stegosaurus, nicknamed Apex, is the most complete of any Stegosaurus skeletons, and measured 8.2 meters in length.
- Pachycephalosaurus: the largest definitive member of Pachycephalosauria. Measured 4.5 meters (14.8 feet) and weighed 370-450 kg (820-990 lbs).

The smallest ornithischian is the heterodontosaurid Fruitadens, measuring 65-75 cm (26-30 in) and weighed 0.5-0.75 kg (1.1-1.7 lbs). Another ornithischian of similar size is Manidens, another heterodontosaurid.

== See also ==
- Largest prehistoric animals
- List of largest birds
- Tallest extant birds
- Megafauna
- Pterosaur size
