= Farak Formation =

Geological formation in Niger

- Stratigraphic range: Cenomanian; ~99–94 Ma
- Type: Geological formation
- Overlies: Echkar Formation

Location
- Coordinates: 16.1°N 5.4°E
- Region: Africa
- Country: Niger
- Extent: Iullemmeden Basin
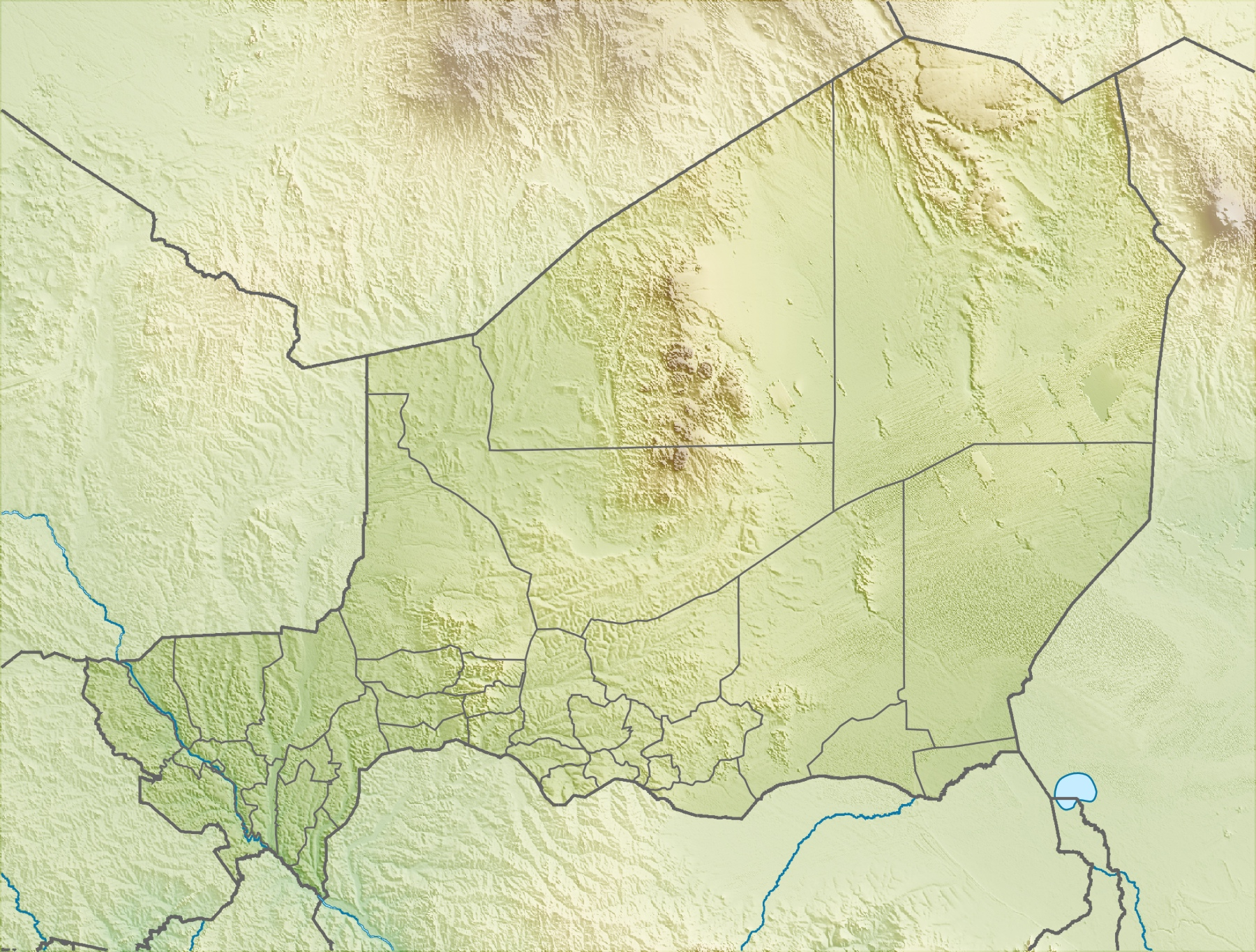
- Farak Formation (Niger)

The Farak Formation is a geological formation in Niger, central Africa.

Its strata date back to the Early Cenomanian. Dinosaur remains are among the fossils that have been recovered from the formation.

== Vertebrate paleofauna ==
Dinosaurs
Genus	Species	Location	Stratigraphic position	Material	Notes	Images
Carcharodontosaurus	C. iguidensis				A carcharodontosaurid theropod	
Carcharodontosaurus	C. sp.				A carcharodontosaurid theropod	
Rebbachisaurus	R. tamesnensis				A rebbachisaurid sauropod	
Aegyptosaurus	A. baharijensis				A titanosaurian sauropod	
Spinosaurus	S. mirabilis			Fragmentary skull (right premaxilla, 4 maxillae, part of the right dentary, a complete right dentary and five maxillary teeth), 3 nasal crests, fragments of the cervical (neck) and dorsal (back) vertebrae, part of the left ischium, and part of the left femur. isolated teeth,partial dorsal and caudal (tail) vertebrae, a partial chevron, a left tibia, and pedal phalanges (toe bones) of multiple specimens	A spinosaurid theropod	

Crocodylomorphs
Genus	Species	Location	Stratigraphic position	Material	Notes	Images
Fortignathus	F. felixi				A possible itasuchid crocodylomorph	

== See also ==
- List of dinosaur-bearing rock formations
- List of fossiliferous stratigraphic units in Niger
