= In Beceten Formation =

Geologic formation in Niger

- Stratigraphic range: Coniacian-Santonian
- Type: Geological formation
- Underlies: Igdaman Group
- Overlies: White Limestone Formation

Lithology
- Primary: Limestone, sandstone
- Other: Shale

Location
- Coordinates: 15.1°N 6.0°E
- Approximate paleocoordinates: 1.7°N 0.9°E
- Region: Tahoua
- Country: Niger
- Extent: Iullemmeden Basin
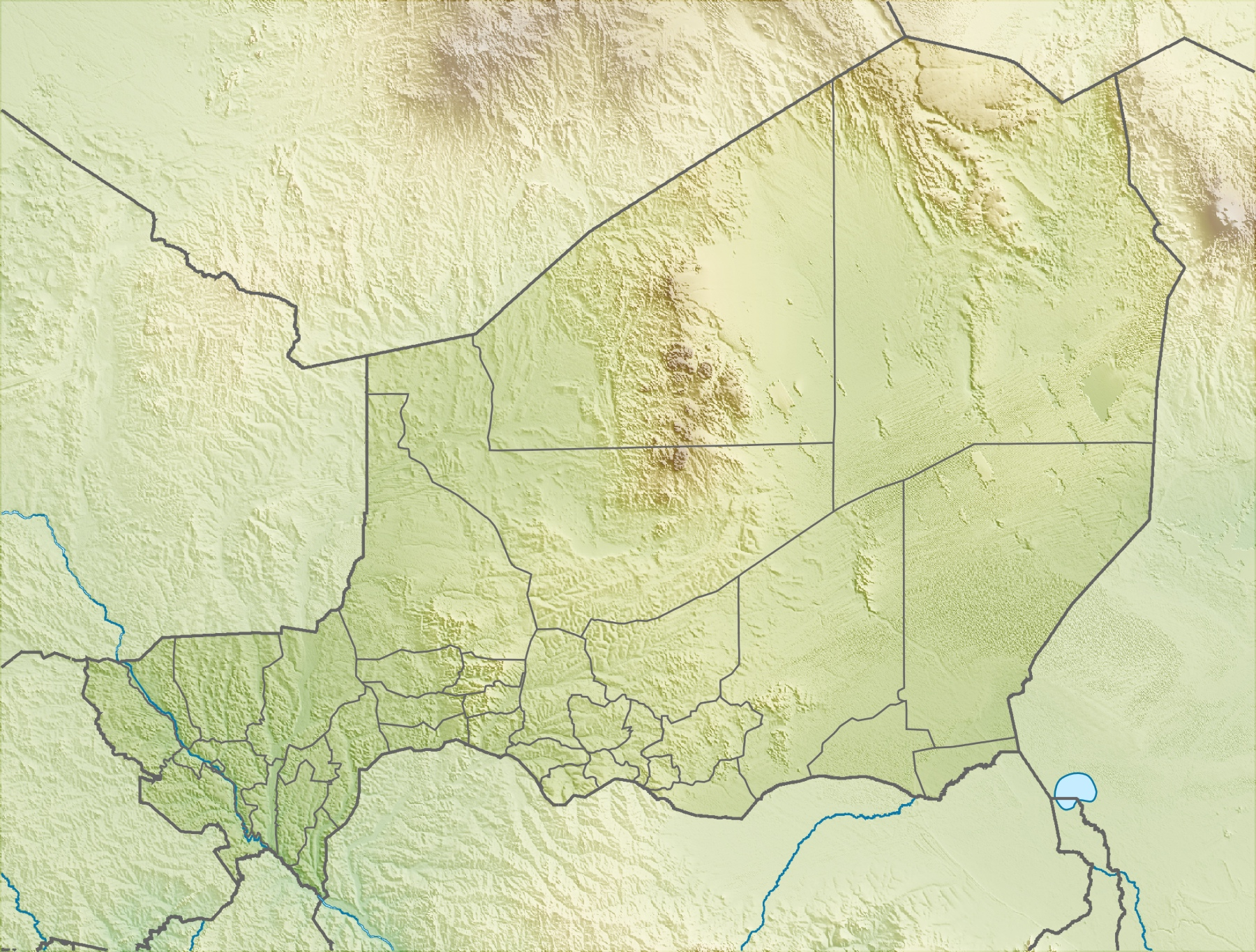
- In Beceten Formation (Niger)

The In Beceten Formation, also Beceten or Ibecten is a Coniacian to Santonian geologic formation in the Iullemmeden Basin of Niger. It has yielded a diverse fauna and some angiosperms. Among others, it has yielded polypterifoms, urodeles, anurans, and turtles. Dinosaur remains are among the other fossils that have been recovered from the formation, although none have yet been referred to a specific genus. The lithology primarily consists of clays, fine limestones and sandy clays.

== Fossil content ==
The following fossils have been reported from the formation:

Fish

- Amia sp.
- Stromerichthys sp.
- Lepisosteidae indet.

Reptiles

- Erymnochelys madagascariensis
- Madtsoia aff. madagascariensis
- Trematochampsa taqueti
- Libycosuchus sp.
- Carnosauria indet.
- Goniopholididae indet.
- Lacertilia indet.
- Pelomedusidae indet.
- Serpentes indet.
- Titanosaurinae indet.

Amphibians

- Pachycentrata taqueti
- Inbecetenanura ragei
- Ranidae indet.
- Urodela indet.

Dipnoi

- Ceratodus sp.
- Protopterus sp.

Flora

- Dicotyledonae

== See also ==
- List of dinosaur-bearing rock formations
  - List of stratigraphic units with indeterminate dinosaur fossils
- Lists of fossiliferous stratigraphic units in Africa
  - List of fossiliferous stratigraphic units in Niger
- Geology of Niger
