= Irhazer Shale =

Geologic formation in Niger

Irhazer Shale Irhazer II Formation
- Stratigraphic range: Middle Jurassic; ~170 Ma Middle Jurassic
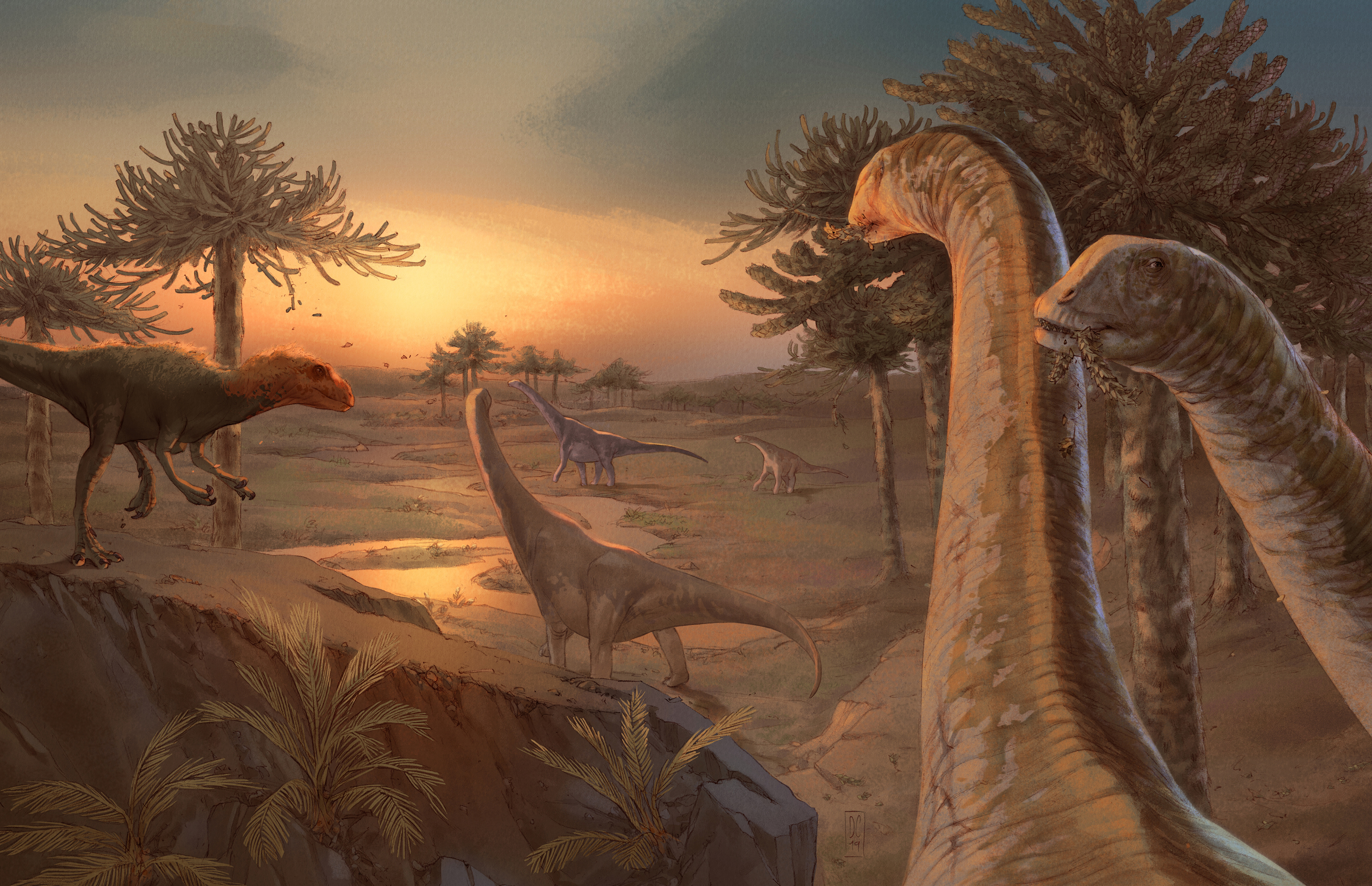
- Paleoenvironment reconstruction
- Type: Geological formation
- Unit of: Irhazer Group
- Underlies: Tiouraren Formation
- Overlies: Assaouas Formation

Lithology
- Primary: Shale, claystone
- Other: Siltstone, sandstone

Location
- Coordinates: 16.7°N 7.9°E
- Approximate paleocoordinates: 8.3°N 2.6°E
- Region: Agadez Region
- Country: Niger
- Extent: Iullemmeden Basin

Type section
- Named for: Irhazer Izane
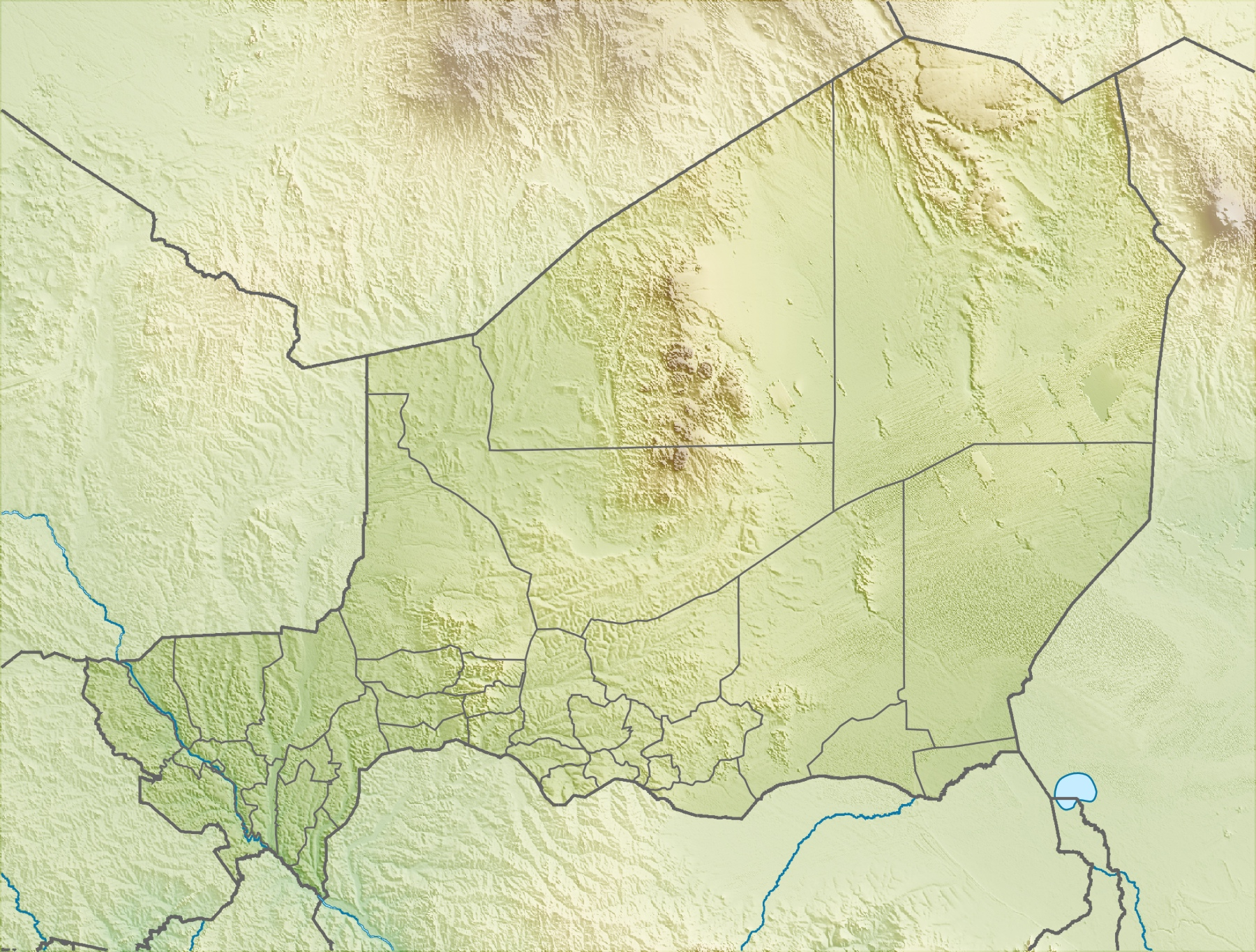
- Irhazer Shale (Niger)

The Irhazer Shale (French: Argiles de l'Irhazer) or Irhazer II Formation is a Middle Jurassic geologic formation of the Irhazer Group in the Agadez Region of Niger. Fossil ornithopod tracks have been reported from the formation. The dinosaur Spinophorosaurus is known from the formation.

== Description ==
As the overlying Tiouraren Formation of the Irhazer Group, the formation previously had been assigned an Early Cretaceous age.

== Fossil content ==
The following fossils were reported from the formation:

- Allosauridae indet.
- Elaphrosaurus iguidiensis
- Ornithopoda indet.
- Paravipus didactyloides
- Spinosauridae or Megalosauridae indet.
- Spinophorosaurus nigerensis

== See also ==
- List of dinosaur-bearing rock formations
  - List of stratigraphic units with ornithischian tracks
    - Ornithopod tracks
- Lists of fossiliferous stratigraphic units in Africa
  - List of fossiliferous stratigraphic units in Niger
- Geology of Niger
