= Tiourarén Formation =

Geological Formation

- Stratigraphic range: Middle or Late Jurassic 170–145 Ma (Suggested post Bathonian, reaching either Oxfordian or even Barremian)
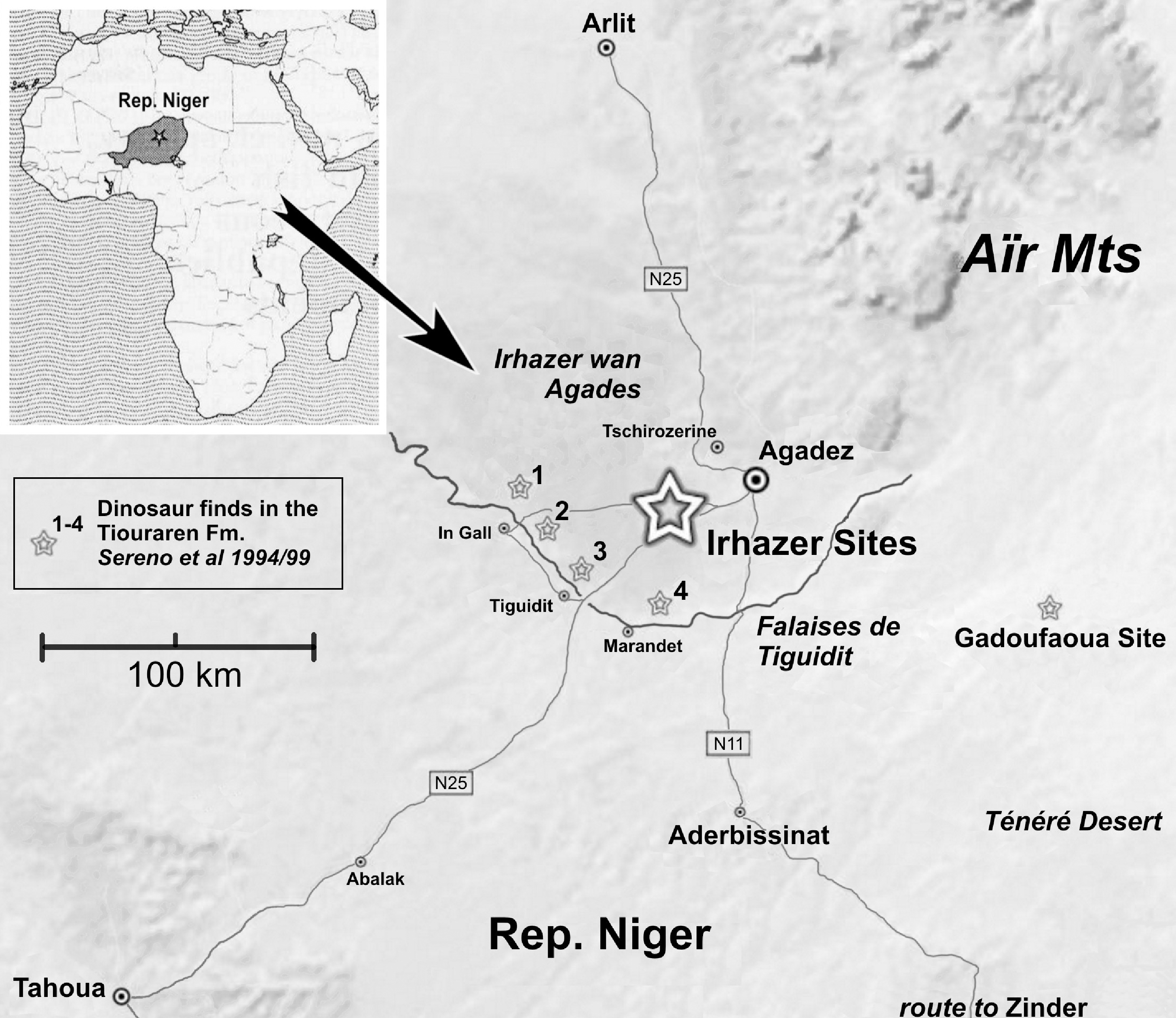
- Map showing dinosaur localities around Agadez, Niger
- Type: Geological formation
- Unit of: Irhazer Group
- Underlies: Tazolé Formation (Tegama Group)
- Overlies: Irhazer Shale
- Thickness: ~350 m (1,150 ft)

Lithology
- Primary: Siltstone, mudstone
- Other: Sandstone, marl, limestone

Location
- Coordinates: 16.5°N 7.8°E
- Approximate paleocoordinates: 8.2°N 2.5°E
- Region: Agadez
- Country: Niger
- Extent: Iullemmeden Basin

Type section
- Named for: Tiourarén hill, Agadez
- Named by: Moody R.T.J. & Sutcliffe P.J.C.
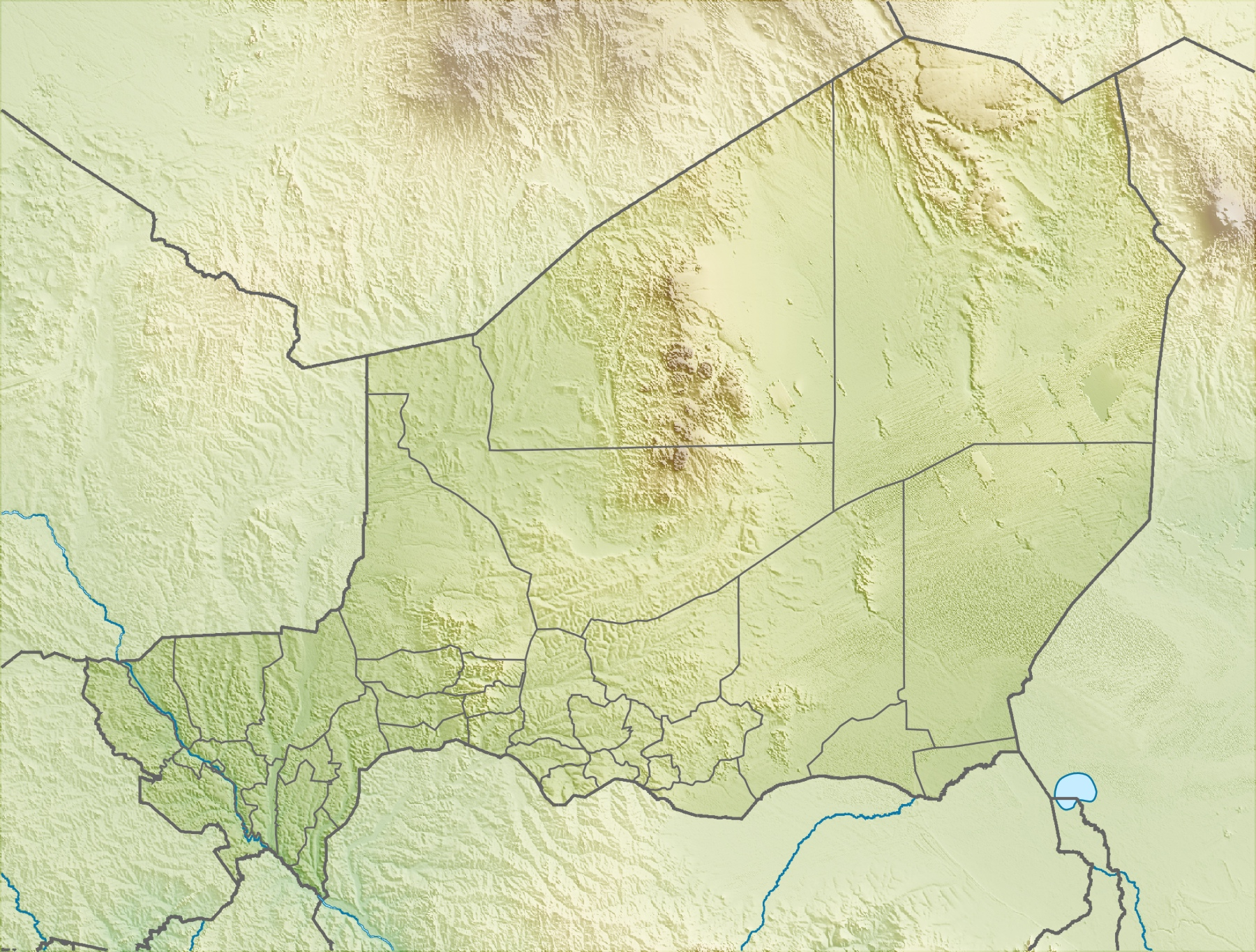
- Tiourarén Formation (Niger)

The Tiourarén Formation is a geological formation in the Agadez Region of Niger whose strata were originally thought to be Early Cretaceous. However, re-interpretation of the sediments showed that they are probably Middle or Late Jurassic (Bathonian-Oxfordian) in age. Other works suggested it reaches the Barremian. It is the uppermost unit of the Irhazer Group. Dinosaur remains & other vertebrates are among the fossils that have been recovered from the formation. Originally part of the "Argiles de l'Ihrazer", the Tiouaren Formation primarily comprises reddish to purple siltstones with occasional marls, limestones, and scarce channel sandstones.

== Description ==
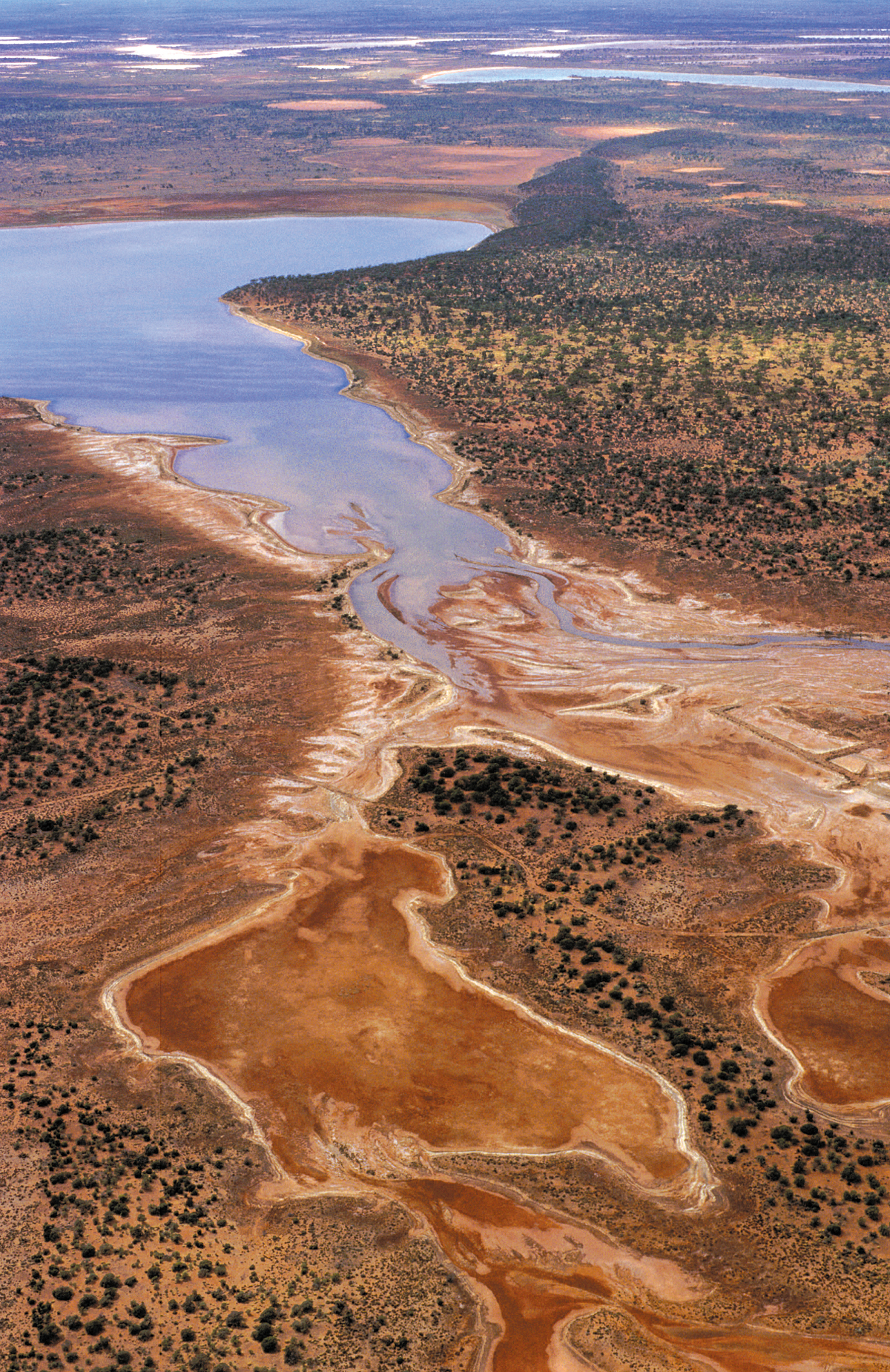
Black Flag Lake near Kalgoorlie Australia, an Equivalent of the Tiourarén Formation

The formation comprises reddish, almost solid mudstones, which also shows grey and white streaks, probably caused by alternating oxidative and reducing environments. Stromatolites are intermittently found in calcareous layers, while indications of semi-arid to arid conditions such as desiccation cracks and caliche horizons have been reported. Other lithology includes green or grayish clays, marls, dolomite beds with chert, and phosphatic sandstone limestones. At Agadez this section is invaded by channels of coarse feldspathic sandstones with limestone nodules and fine, ripple-marked sandstones, featuring green and purple clays with intercalations of cherty limestone beds in the uppermost sequence. The sandstone component increases eastward, and the formation wedges out between the underlying Agadez Sandstones and the overlying Tegama Group.

The formation suggests a low-energy setting with expansive floodplains, temporary shallow lake development, and calcrete horizon interchanged with swamps, with seasonal flooding from a meandering, shallow river system dominated by overbanked silt. Many sandstone channels are composed of reworked sand grain-sized pebbles of mudstone, supporting the view of a predominantly low-relief environment. This latter feature is suggested by the widespread occurrence freshwater ostracod accumulations and rarer unionid bivalve shells. Local sedimenst were very affected and influenced by large scale faulting.

The Early Cretaceous dating for the Tiouaren Formation was based on vertebrate fossil evidence, specially Mawsoniidae coelacanths (referred without evidence to Mawsonia lavocati), while other taxa like Hybodus? sp. and Lepidotes? sp., are either dubious or have a suggested wide temporal distribution and invertebrates (conchostracans and unionid bivalves), offer limited stratigraphic value. Recent report of an ash bed and other potentially datable beds near fossil bearing horizons opens the possibility of a future age calibration.

== Fossil content ==
Color key: Taxon / Reclassified taxon / Taxon falsely reported as present / Dubious taxon or junior synonym / Ichnotaxon / Ootaxon / Morphotaxon	Notes; Uncertain or tentative taxa are in small text; ~~crossed out~~ taxa are discredited.

=== Bivalves ===
Bivalves of the Tiourarén Formation
Genus	Species	Location	Stratigraphic position	Material	Notes	Image
Adrarunio	A. deserticus	Teguidda-n-Adrar	Lower Member	Shells	A nakamuranaiadid freshwater bivalve; one of the earliest known trigonioidoids	
Afrohyrioides	A. jowikolensis	20 km E of Mount Bellal; Mount Iguallala	Upper Member	Shells	A unionid freshwater bivalve	
Asturianaia	A. soudanensis	In-Tedreft; KP-35, Zinder track; Reg Tamesna	All Members	Shells	A margaritiferid freshwater bivalve	
Coactunio	C. iguallalensis	Mount Iguallala; Mount Ebenenanoua	Upper Member	Shells	A unionid freshwater bivalve	
Rostrunio	R. lapparenti	KP-35, Zinder track	Upper Member	Shells	A unionid freshwater bivalve	
Saharella	S. tedreftensis	Reg Tamesna	Upper Member	Shells	A unionid freshwater bivalve	
Tamesnella	T. amatouensis	SE of In-Afer; In-Amatou; 20 km E of Mount Bellal; SW of Oued Tessellamane	Upper Member	Shells	A tamesnelloid freshwater epifaunal substrate bivalve	
Tamesnelloides	T. lithoides	SE of In-Afer	Upper Member	Shells	A tamesnelloid freshwater epifaunal substrate bivalve	
Tegulaedon	T. humei	SE of In-Afer; 35 km NE of Mount Bellal	Upper Member	Shells	A margaritiferid freshwater bivalve	
Tuaregunio	T. agadesensis	KP-35, Zinder track	Upper Member	Shells	A unionid freshwater bivalve	
Unionelloides	U. globulosus	Teguidda-n-Tessoumt; SE of In-Afer; In-Amatou; 35 km NE of Mount Bellal; 20 km E of Mount Bellal; SW of Oued Tessellamane; Erg Jadal	Upper Member	Shells	A unionid freshwater bivalve. U. giganteus represents an unusually large taxon.	
Unionelloides	U. (Phortunio) giganteus	10 km E of In-Abangarit	Upper Member	Shells	A unionid freshwater bivalve. U. giganteus represents an unusually large taxon.	
Unionelloides	U. bellalensis	35 km NE of Mount Bellal	Upper Member	Shells	A unionid freshwater bivalve. U. giganteus represents an unusually large taxon.	
Unionida	Indet A	Reg Tamesna	All Members	Shells	Indeterminate A unionid freshwater bivalves	Example of extant Unionid
Unionida	Indet. B	Teguidda-n-Adrar	All Members	Shells	Indeterminate A unionid freshwater bivalves	Example of extant Unionid

=== Fishes ===
Fishes of the Tiourarén Formation
Genus	Species	Location	Stratigraphic position	Material	Notes	Image
Asiatoceratodus	A. tiguidensis	Irhazer Plain; Falaise de Tiguidit	Upper Member	Isolated tooth plates & other remains	An asiatoceratodontid lungfish	
Ceratodus	C. sp.	Falaise de Tiguidit	Upper Member	Tooth plates	A ceratodontid lungfish	Reconstruction
Holostei Indet.	Indeterminate	Falaise de Tiguidit	Upper Member	"scales of ganoid fishes"	Indeterminate fish remains	
Hybodus?	H.? spp.	Abaka, Agadez; Tadibene; Irhazer Plain	Upper Member	Teeth	A hybodontiform chondrichthyan	Hybodus model
Lepidotes?	L. spp.	Abaka, Agadez; Tadibene; Irhazer Plain	Upper Member	Isolated scales	A lepisosteiform bony fish	Lepidotes
Mawsoniidae Indet.	Indeterminate	Abaka, Agadez; Tadibene; Irhazer Plain	Upper Member	Teeth, isolated scales & partially articulated remains of the caudal fin	A coelacanth, previously referred to Mawsonia	

=== Turtles ===
"Turtle Bones" where quoted in the OR description of the unit.

Turtles of the Tiourarén Formation
Genus	Species	Location	Stratigraphic position	Material	Notes	Image
Pleurodira Indet.	Indeterminate	Abaka, Agadez	Upper Member	Isolated Remains	Indeterminate Turtle remains	
Testudinata? Indet.	Indeterminate	Irhazer Plain	Upper Member	Isolated egg	Based on the "small size, spherical shape, and small pores" was suggested it belonged to a turtle	

=== Crocodylomorphs ===
"Crocodiles" where quoted in the OR description of the unit.

Crocodylomorphs of the Tiourarén Formation
Genus	Species	Location	Stratigraphic position	Material	Notes	Image
Crocodylomorpha Indet.	Indeterminate	Abaka, Agadez; Falaise de Tiguidit; Tawachi	Upper Member	Teeth, osteoderms	Indeterminate crocodylomorph remains	
Goniopholididae Indet.	Gen. et sp. nov A	Irhazer Plain	Upper Member	Complete skull	The first African goniopholidids, suggesting connections with Laurasia	
Goniopholididae Indet.	Gen. et sp. nov B	Irhazer Plain	Upper Member	Narrow cranium with elongated snout	The first African goniopholidids, suggesting connections with Laurasia	

=== Dinosaurs ===
"Rare (in abundance) pterosaurs" where quoted in the OR description of the unit.

Dinosaurs of the Tiourarén Formation
Genus	Species	Location	Stratigraphic position	Material	Notes	Image
Afrovenator	A. abakensis	Abaka, Agadez	Upper Member	UC OBA 1, partial skull and associated postcranial remains	An afrovenatorine megalosauroidean	
Afrovenator	A? sp.	NE of Tadibene	Upper Member	TP4-12, rostral part of left maxilla	An afrovenatorine megalosauroidean	
Afrovenator	Cf. A sp.	Tawachi	Upper Member	Premaxillae, dentaries and appendicular skeleton	An afrovenatorine megalosauroidean	
Allosauridae Indet.	Indeterminate	NE of Tadibene	Upper Member	TP4-6; TP4-7, isolated teeth	Teeth referred to allosaurids or basal allosauroids	
Ceratosauria Indet.	Indeterminate	NE of Tadibene	Upper Member	TP4-4, isolated teeth	An indeterminate ceratosaur	
Eusauropoda Indet.	Gen. et sp. nov 1	Irhazer Plain	Lower Member	Skull and multiple articulated postcranial skeletons	A notoriously complete taxon with stocky proportions, robust skull, and short neck	
Eusauropoda Indet.	Gen. et sp. nov 2	Agadez	Upper Member	Dorsal vertebrae, humerus, and femur	Differs from other local taxa on pleurocoels on posterior dorsal vertebrae and a longer humerus relative to the femur	
Jobaria	J. tiguidensis	Tamerát, Agadez; Fako, Agadez; Tawachi	Upper Member	Skull and several skeletons	A sauropod, maybe a eusauropod; among the most abundant terrestrial vertebrates in the formation	
Megalosauridae Indet.	Indeterminate	NE of Tadibene	Upper Member	TP4-5, TP4-8, TP4-10, teeth	An indeterminate megalosaur	
"Rebbachisaurus"	"R." tamesnensis	Tamerát, Agadez	Upper Member	Dorsal vertebrae and scapula	An indeterminate sauropod, also reported from younger Cretaceous beds, likely representing different taxa.	
Sauropoda Indet.	Indeterminate	Falaise de Tiguidit; Soureya buttes	Upper Member	SMNB 1695-R, articulated caudal series, partial other postcrania; Undescribed isolated & disarticulated bones	Indeterminate or unnamed sauropod remains	
Spinosauridae? Indet.	Indeterminate	NE of Tadibene	Upper Member	TP4-2, TP4-3, teeth	Referred to spinosaurs, may be of ceratosaur origin instead	
Spinostropheus	S. gautieri	Fako, Agadez; Tawachi; Tedreft	Upper Member	Remains of many individuals including cervical, dorsal, and caudal vertebra, partial left humerus, ulna, distal pubis, distal femur, incomplete tibia, fibulae, metatarsals, pedal phalangeal fragments, and manual unguals	Possibly a basal ceratosaurian, a basal abelisauroid, or a noasaurid	
Thyreophora Indet.	Gen. et sp. nov	Abaka, Agadez; Tawachi	Upper Member	"Associated, but disarticulated, bones, teeth, and abundant scutes from many individuals ranging in maturity from subadult to adult"	A basal thyreophoran, suggested to be related to Scutellosaurus. A relatively common taxon, with a bonebed of up to twenty individuals.	
Turiasauria Indet.	Gen. et sp. nov	Agadez	Upper Member	Partial articulated skeletons	Differs from Jobaria in deflected humeral head, shorter to the ulna and radius	

=== Plants ===
Plants of the Tiourarén Formation
Genus	Species	Location	Stratigraphic position	Material	Notes	Image
Taxodioideae Indet.	Indeterminate	Falaise de Tiguidit	Upper Member	Fossil wood	Conifer wood referred the family Cupressaceae. Petrified wood is notoriously abundant, suggesting dense forested areas surrounding the local braided river systems	Taxodium distichum, extant example of conifer of the same family

== See also ==
- List of dinosaur-bearing rock formations
- Lists of fossiliferous stratigraphic units in Africa
  - List of fossiliferous stratigraphic units in Niger
- Geology of Niger
