= Iullemmeden Basin =

- Location within Africa

- Location of the Iullemmeden Basin
- Coordinates: 17.9°N 5.6°E
- Etymology: Iullemmeden
- Location: Africa
- Region: Azawagh
- Country: Algeria; Benin; Mali; Niger; Nigeria

Characteristics
- On/Offshore: Onshore
- Boundaries: Aïr Mountains (NE)
- Area: 1,000 km × 800 km (620 mi × 500 mi)

Hydrology
- River: Niger River

Geology
- Basin type: Intercratonic basin
- Plate: African
- Orogeny: Pan-African
- Age: Permo-Triassic-Pleistocene
- Stratigraphy: Stratigraphy

West African basins

The Iullemmeden Basin (Berber language: Iwellemmedden) is a major sub-Saharan inland basin in West Africa, extending about 1,000 kilometres (620 mi) north to south and 800 kilometres (500 mi) east to west. It covers western Niger and parts of Algeria, Mali and Nigeria. It is named after the Iullemmeden, a federation of Tuareg people who live in the central region of Niger. Its geographic range is largely coincident with the Azawagh region.

== Description ==
The area of the Iullemmeden Basin seems to have started to subside in Permo-Triassic times, and to have experienced gradual downwarping during the Late Cretaceous to Paleogene times, while steadily filling with sediment. Two prominent fault trends run NNE-SSW through the center of the basin, while WSW-ENE faults trends are found in the northeast of the basin near the Aïr Mountains.

== Stratigraphy ==
The sediments from Cambrian to Pleistocene times are 1,500 to 2,000 metres (4,900 to 6,600 ft) thick, with alternating layers formed when the basin was undersea and above sea level. Potentially valuable minerals include uranium and copper ores and coal and salt deposits. Niger is one of the world's largest producers of uranium.

=== Formations of the Iullemmeden Basin ===
- Gwandu Formation
- Kalambaina Formation
- Wurno Formation
- Taloka Formation
- Dukamaje Formation
- Igdaman Group
- Majias Group
  - Farin Doutchi Formation
  - In Beceten Formation
- Zoo Baba Formation
- Alanlara Formation
- Tegama Group
  - Farak Formation
  - Echkar Formation
  - Elrhaz Formation
  - Tazolé Formation
- Ilrhazer Group
  - Tiourarén Formation
  - Irhazer Shale
- Téfidet Group
  - Tagrezou Sandstone
- Agadez Group
  - Assaouas Formation
  - Tchirezrine Formation
  - Teloua Formation
- Izégouandane Group
  - Moradi Formation
  - Tamamait Formation
  - Tejia Formation
  - Izégouandane Formation

== See also ==
- Chad Basin
- Niger Delta Basin
- Taoudeni Basin
