= Echkar Formation =

Geologic formation in Niger

- Stratigraphic range: Late Albian-Cenomanian; ~100–95 Ma
- Type: Geological formation
- Unit of: Tegama Group
- Underlies: Farak Formation
- Overlies: Elrhaz Formation

Lithology
- Primary: Sandstone
- Other: Claystone

Location
- Coordinates: 17.9°N 5.6°E
- Approximate paleocoordinates: 2.8°N 0.4°E
- Region: Agadez Region
- Country: Niger
- Extent: Iullemmeden Basin

Type section
- Named for: Echkar, Aderbissinat
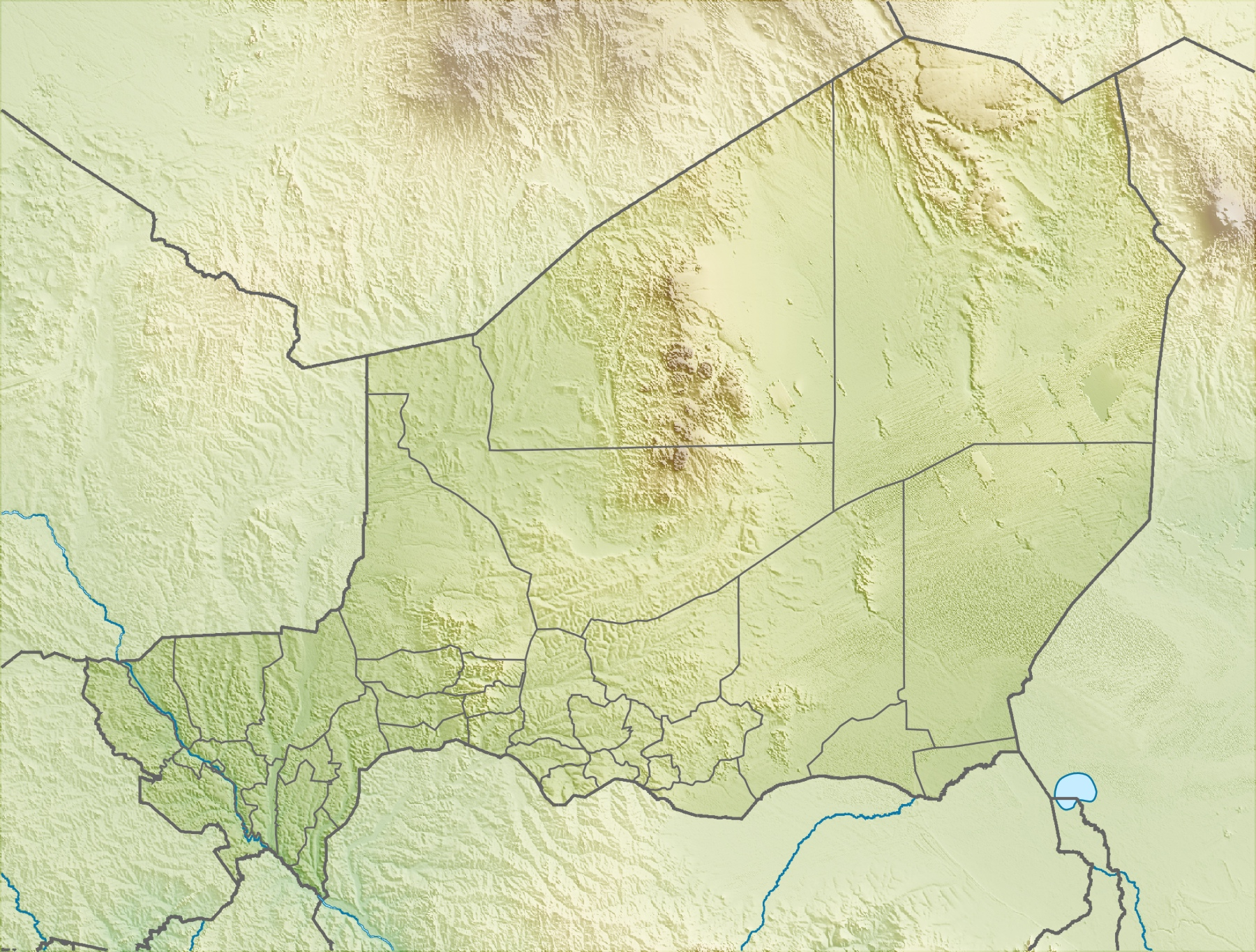
- Echkar Formation (Niger)

The Echkar Formation is a geological formation comprising sandstones and claystones in the Agadez Region of Niger, central Africa.

== Description ==
Its strata date back to the Late Albian to Late Cretaceous (Cenomanian stages, about 100-95 million years ago). Dinosaur remains are among the fossils that have been recovered from the formation.

== Fossil content ==
=== Fish ===
Fish of the Echkar Formation
Genus	Species	Material	Notes	Images
Ceratodus	C. sp.			
Lepidotes	L. sp.			
Onchopristis	O. numida			
Platyspondylus	P. foureaui			

=== Dinosaurs ===
Color key: Taxon / Reclassified taxon / Taxon falsely reported as present / Dubious taxon or junior synonym / Ichnotaxon / Ootaxon / Morphotaxon	Notes; Uncertain or tentative taxa are in small text; ~~crossed out~~ taxa are discredited.

==== Ornithischians ====
Ornithischians of the Echkar Formation
Genus	Species	Material	Notes	Images
?Stegosauria indet.			No genus given. May not actually belong to Stegosauria.	

==== Sauropods ====
Sauropods of the Echkar Formation
Genus	Species	Material	Notes	Images
Aegyptosaurus	A. baharijensis			
Rebbachisaurus	R. tamesnensis R. sp.			

==== Theropods ====
Theropods of the Echkar Formation
Genus	Species	Material	Notes	Images
Bahariasaurus	B. ingens			
Elaphrosaurus	E. iguidiensis (=Theropoda indet.)		Likely an indeterminate theropod.	
Inosaurus	I. tedreftensis			
Rugops	R. primus			

=== Reptiles ===
Color key: Taxon / Reclassified taxon / Taxon falsely reported as present / Dubious taxon or junior synonym / Ichnotaxon / Ootaxon / Morphotaxon	Notes; Uncertain or tentative taxa are in small text; ~~crossed out~~ taxa are discredited.

Reptiles of the Echkar Formation
Genus	Species	Material	Notes	Images
Araripesuchus	A. rattoides			
Elosuchus	E. sp.			
Fortignathus	F. felixi			
Kaprosuchus	K. saharicus			
Laganosuchus	L. thaumastos			
Testudines indet.			No genus given.	

== See also ==
- List of dinosaur-bearing rock formations
- Lists of fossiliferous stratigraphic units in Africa
  - List of fossiliferous stratigraphic units in Niger
- Geology of Niger
