= Dukamaje Formation =

Geological formation in Niger and Nigeria

- Stratigraphic range: Maastrichtian
- Type: Geological formation
- Sub-units: Gypsiferous shale Member

Lithology
- Primary: Mudstone, shale
- Other: Siltstone, marl, gypsum

Location
- Coordinates: 15.4°N 5.8°E
- Approximate paleocoordinates: 5.1°N 0.6°E
- Region: Tahoua; Sokoto
- Country: Niger, Nigeria
- Extent: Iullemmeden Basin

Type section
- Named for: Dukamaje, Sokoto, Nigeria
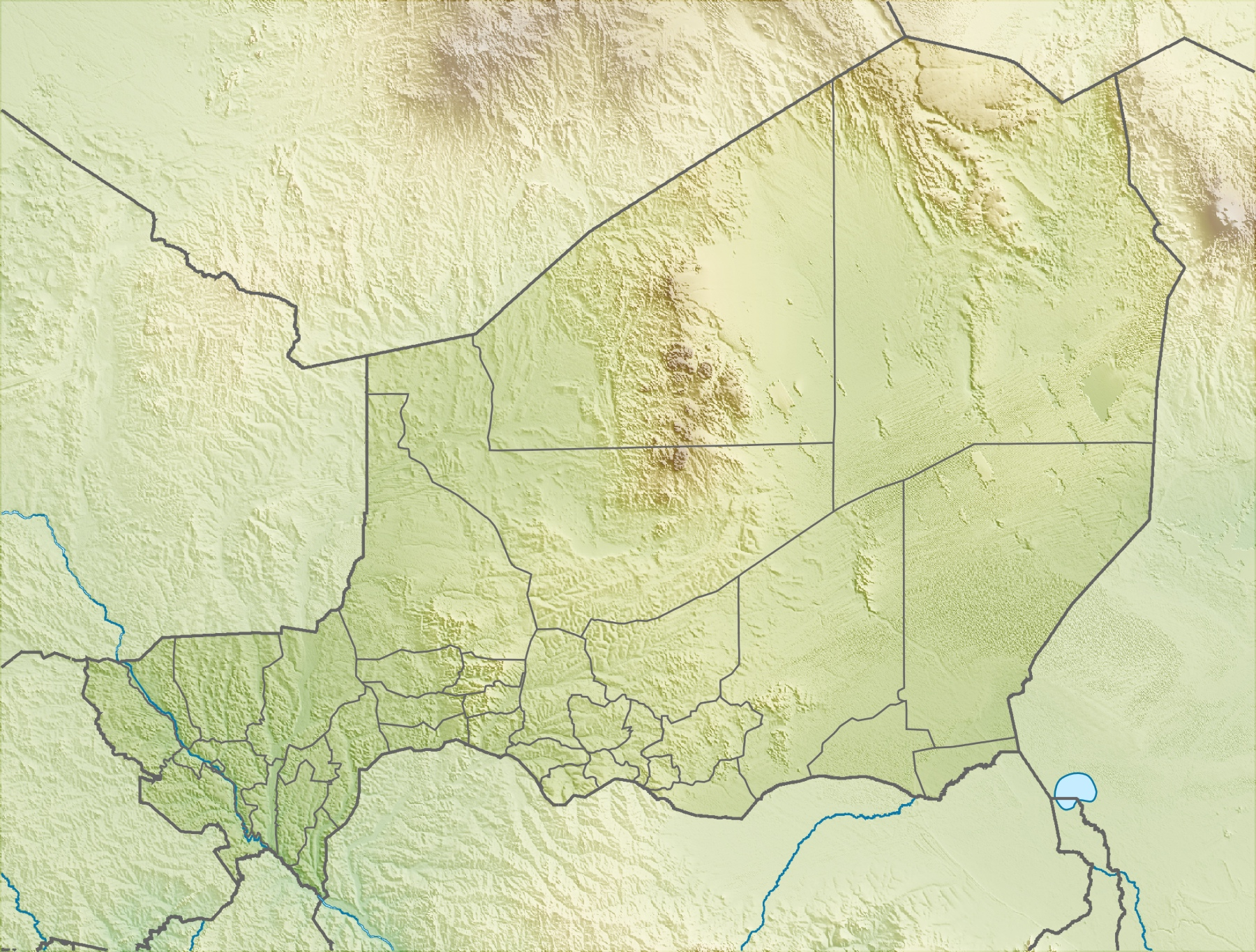
- Dukamaje Formation (Niger)

The Dukamaje Formation is a geological formation in Niger and Nigeria whose strata date back to the Late Cretaceous. Dinosaur remains are among the fossils that have been recovered from the formation. A wealth of Mosasaur fossils have also been recovered from this formation, particularly from the area around Mt. Igdaman.

== Fossil content ==
Dinosaurs of the Dukamaje Formation
Taxa	Presence	Description	Images
Genus: ?Bahariasaurus; 1. ?B. ingens.	1. Geographically present in Département De Tahoua, Niger.		

Mosasaurs of the Dukamaje Formation
Taxa	Presence	Description	Images
Genus: Igdamanosaurus; 1. I. aegyptiacus	1. Geographically present on Mt. Igdaman, near the village of Igdaman (or In Daman).	Mid-sized globidensine mosasaur. Originally described as a plioplatecarpine. Durophagous.	Goronyosaurus and juvenile elasmosaurs
Genus: Goronyosaurus; 1. G. nigeriensis 2. G. sp.	1. Type locality unknown. From the portion of the Dukamaje Formation located in Nigeria.; 2. Geographically present on Mt. Igdaman. From the portion of the Dukamaje Formation located in Niger.	Large mosasaur of uncertain affiliations. High number of foramina on the snout and small eyes indicate a murky-water hunter.	Goronyosaurus and juvenile elasmosaurs
Genus: ?Angolasaurus; 1. ?A. sp.	1. Geographically present on Mt. Igdaman.	Represented here by four vertebrae, one from a juvenile. Fragmentary state makes identification difficult.	Goronyosaurus and juvenile elasmosaurs
Genus: Halisaurus; 1. H. sp.	1. Geographically present on Mt. Igdaman.	Mid-sized mosasaur. Represented here by four vertebrae.	Goronyosaurus and juvenile elasmosaurs
Genus: Plioplatecarpus; 1. P. sp.	1. Geographically present on Mt. Igdaman.	Mid-sized plioplatecarpine mosasaur. Represented here by several vertebrae.	Goronyosaurus and juvenile elasmosaurs
Genus: Platecarpus; 1. P. sp.	1. Geographically present on Mt. Igdaman.	Mid-sized plioplatecarpine mosasaur. Represented here by a single fragmentary vertebrae.	Goronyosaurus and juvenile elasmosaurs
Genus: Mosasaurus; 1. cf. M. hoffmannii	1. Geographically present on Mt. Igdaman.	Massive mosasaurine mosasaur. Represented here by a fragmentary tooth crown. The first example of Mosasaurus from Niger and Nigeria.	Goronyosaurus and juvenile elasmosaurs

Other reptiles

- Sokotosuchus ianwilsoni
- Palaeophis sp.
- Podocnemis sp.
- Trematochampsa taqueti
- Libycosuchus sp.

Fishes

- Asteracanthus aegyptiacus
- Igdabatis sigmodon
- Lamna nigeriana
- Schizorhiza stromeri
- Stephanodus lybicus
- Stratodus apicalis
- Ischyrhiza nigeriensis
- Ceratodus sp.
- Ginglymostoma sp.
- Pycnodus sp.

== See also ==
- List of dinosaur-bearing rock formations
- Lists of fossiliferous stratigraphic units in Africa
  - List of fossiliferous stratigraphic units in Niger
- Geology of Niger
- Geology of Nigeria
