= List of fossiliferous stratigraphic units in Niger =

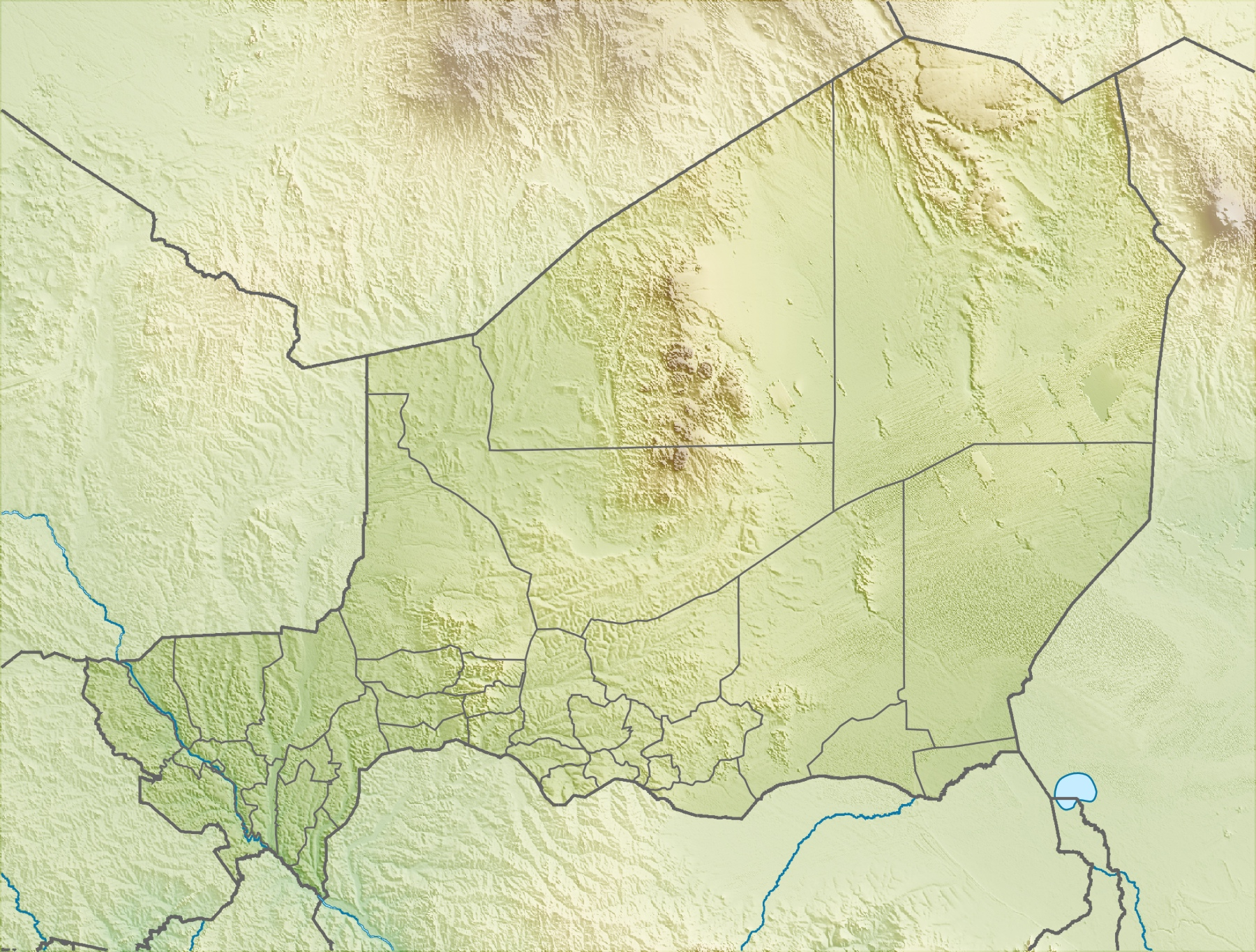
Major fossiliferous stratigraphic units in Niger
Kalambaina Formation
Dukamaje Formation
In Beceten Formation
Tegama Group (Echkar & Elrhaz Formations)
Assaouas Formation
Irhazer Group (Tiourarén & Irhazer Formations)
Moradi Formation

This is a list of fossiliferous stratigraphic units in Niger.

== List of fossiliferous stratigraphic units ==
Group	Formation	Period	Notes
	Kalambaina Formation	Thanetian	
	Dukamaje Formation	Maastrichtian	
Majias Group	Farin Doutchi Formation	Maastrichtian	
	In Beceten Formation	Late Coniacian-Santonian	
	Zoo Baba Formation	Late Cenomanian-Early Turonian	
	Alanlara Formation	Early Cenomanian	
Tegama Group	Echkar Formation	Late Albian-Early Cenomanian	
Tegama Group	Elrhaz Formation	Late Aptian-Early Albian	
Téfidet Group	Tagrezou Sandstone	Early Berriasian-Cenomanian	
Agadez Group	Assaouas Formation	Late Jurassic	
Irhazer Group	Tiourarén Formation	Bathonian	
Irhazer Group	Irhazer Shale or Irhazer II Formation	Middle Jurassic	
Izégouandane Group	Moradi Formation	Changhsingian	

== See also ==
- Lists of fossiliferous stratigraphic units in Africa
  - List of fossiliferous stratigraphic units in Mali
- Geology of Niger
