= Assaouas Formation =

Late Jurassic geologic formation in Niger

- Stratigraphic range: Middle Jurassic
- Type: Geological formation
- Unit of: Agadez Group
- Underlies: Irhazer Shale

Lithology
- Primary: Sandstone

Location
- Coordinates: 17.9°N 7.1°E
- Approximate paleocoordinates: 9.2°N 2.6°E
- Region: Agadez
- Country: Niger

Type section
- Named for: Assaouas, Agadez
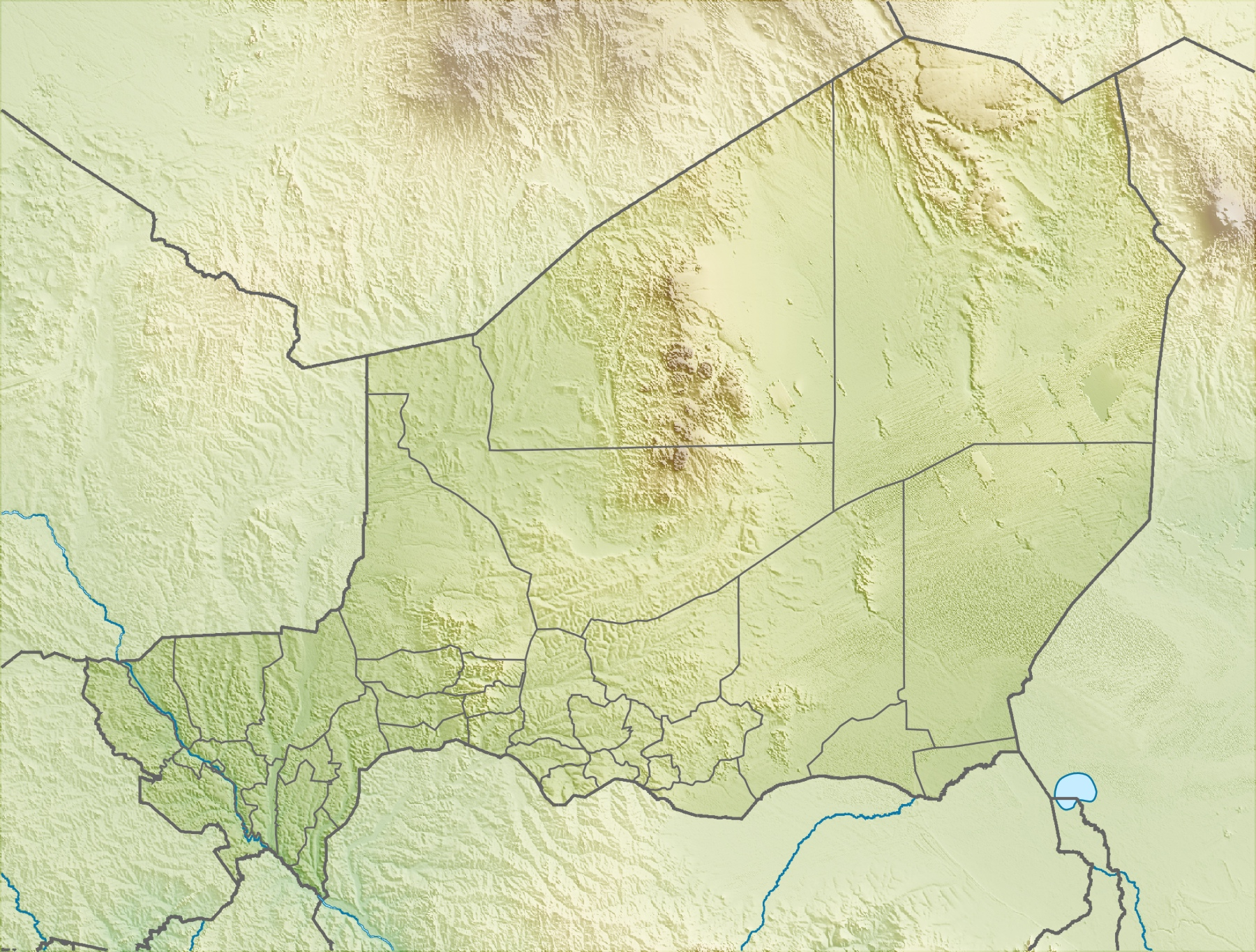
- Assaouas Formation (Niger)

The Assaouas Formation, also referred to as the Assaouas Sandstone (French: Grès d'Assaouas) is a Late Jurassic geologic formation in Niger. Fossil sauropod tracks have been reported from the formation.

== See also ==
- List of dinosaur-bearing rock formations
  - List of stratigraphic units with sauropodomorph tracks
    - Sauropod tracks
- Lists of fossiliferous stratigraphic units in Africa
  - List of fossiliferous stratigraphic units in Niger
- Geology of Niger
