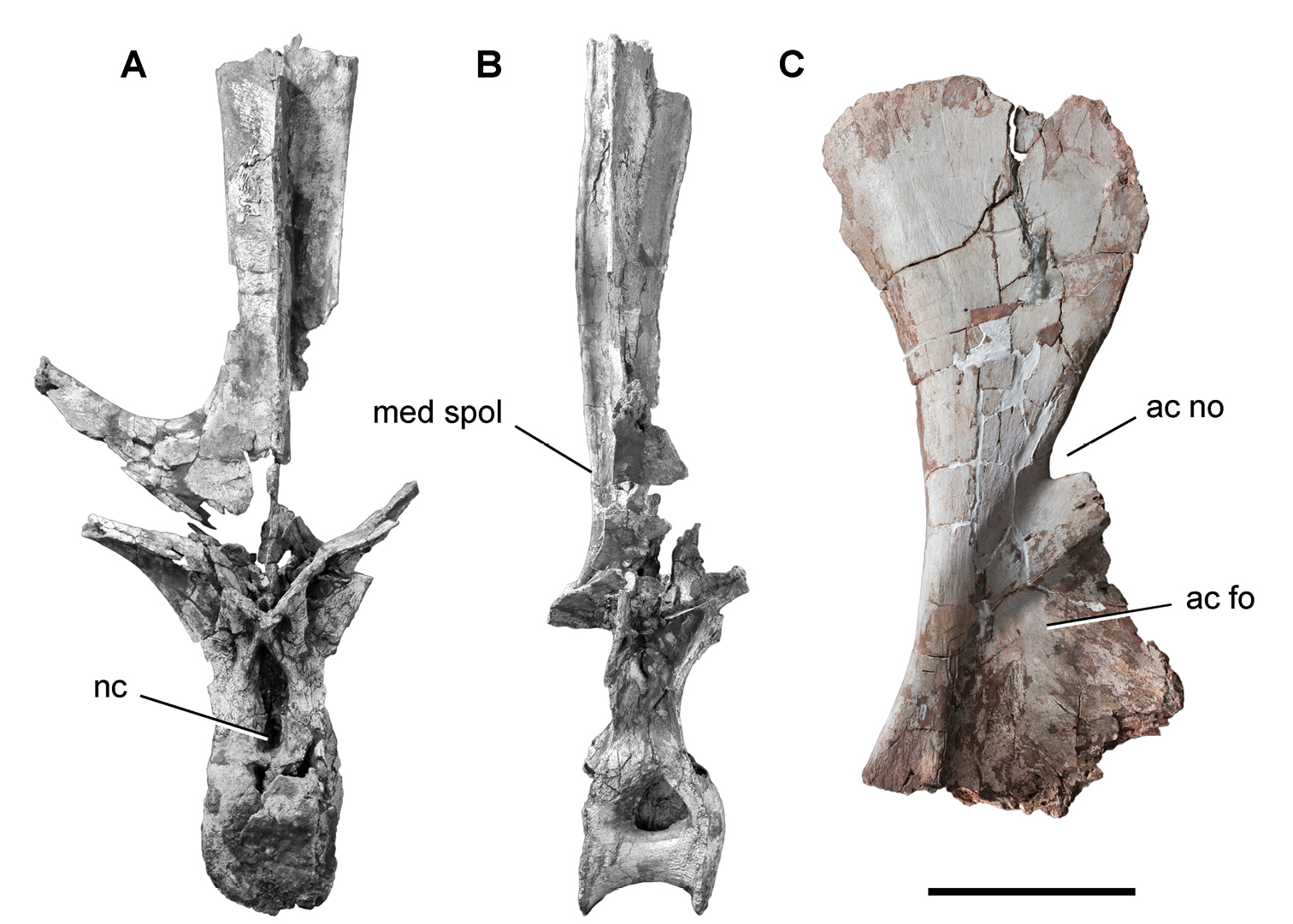
- Holotype dorsal vertebra (A, B) and scapula (C)

Scientific classification
- Kingdom: Animalia
- Phylum: Chordata
- Class: Reptilia
- Clade: Dinosauria
- Clade: Saurischia
- Clade: †Sauropodomorpha
- Clade: †Sauropoda
- Superfamily: †Diplodocoidea
- Family: †Rebbachisauridae
- Subfamily: †Rebbachisaurinae
- Genus: †Rebbachisaurus; Lavocat, 1954

Type species
- †Rebbachisaurus garasbae Lavocat, 1954

Other Species
- †R. tamesnensis Lapparent, 1960 (nomen dubium)

= Rebbachisaurus =

Rebbachisaurus Temporal range: Late Cretaceous, 99–97 Ma

Extinct genus of dinosaurs

Rebbachisaurus (meaning "Aït Rebbach lizard") is a genus of sauropod dinosaur that lived in what is now Africa during the Late Cretaceous period, between 99 and 97 million years ago. The only valid species is R. garasbae. However, two other species have been assigned to the genus; R. tessonei, now Limaysaurus tessonei, and the nomen dubium R. tamesnensis. Known from a single, incomplete skeleton, much of R. garasbae's anatomy is unknown. The skeleton, discovered in 1948, was unearthed in the Errachidia Province of Morocco from strata of the Kem Kem Beds.

Like other rebbachisaurids, Rebbachisaurus was a four-legged herbivore with a long neck ending in a relatively large head. Although once thought to be as long as 20 meters (66 ft) in length, more recent estimates place it at 14 meters (46 ft) long and weighing 7–12 metric tons (7.7–13.2 short tons). This would make it among the largest known rebbachisaurids. Its dorsal vertebrae are characterized by their tall neural spines and large pleurocoels, which held extensive air sacs. Its vertebrae are very tall and reach up to 150 centimeters (59 in) tall, while those of South American rebbachisaurids get to only around 50 centimeters (20 in). Its humerus is somewhat robust for a rebbachisaurid, with an estimated complete length of 100–105 centimeters (39–41 in) and a greatly expanded proximal (towards body) end.

Rebbachisaurus is the type genus of the family Rebbachisauridae, though its exact relation to other members is uncertain. Being a rebbachisaurid, Rebbachisaurus was likely a generalist or ground-height browser. Many gigantic theropods are known from North Africa during this period, including Carcharodontosaurus, Spinosaurus, and Deltadromeus, while Rebbachisaurus is the only named sauropod from the Kem Kem Beds. North Africa at the time was blanketed in mangrove forests and wetlands, creating a hotspot of fish, crocodyliform, and pterosaur diversity

== Discovery and species ==
Skeletal reconstruction of the holotype of R. garasbae

Fossils assigned to Rebbachisaurus were first discovered in the Gara Sbaa locality in Errachidia Province, southeastern Morocco between 8 October 1948 and 1 April 1949 by French paleontologist René Lavocat. Lavocat was on his second expedition to the Cretaceous-aged outcrops of the "Continental intercalaire" of the Sahara Desert, which was then under French colonial administration. Over two additional expeditions, researchers recovered a fragmentary, partially articulated skeleton. It included a complete posterior (towards back) dorsal vertebra (backbone), fragments from four dorsal neural spines, two damaged dorsal neural spines, dorsal rib shaft fragments, fused neural spines from two sacral vertebrae and an incomplete neural spine of a third, two caudal (tail vertebrae) neural spines, the right scapula (shoulder blade), the right humerus (upper arm bone), the right ischium (back lower pelvic bone), and many neural spine fragments. However, the specimen initially included six caudal vertebrae in articulation, two of which have been missing, the sacrum, and much of the ribs. By 3 January 1952, the last of the four expeditions to recover the fossils had concluded and the specimen was then brought to the National Museum of Natural History in Paris where it was deposited under specimen number MNHN-MRS 1958. The locality which MNHN-MRS 1958 was found in was later assigned to the Gara Sbaa Formation of the Kem Kem Beds, indicating it dates to the Cenomanian-Albian ages of the middle Cretaceous period.

In 1954, Lavocat scientifically described the remains and assigned them to a new genus and species of sauropod, which he named Rebbachisaurus garasbae. Rebbachisaurus is considered his most famous discovery. Additionally, MNHN-MRS 1958 is the only associated vertebrate skeleton known from the Gara Sbaa Formation and one of only two articulated vertebrate skeletons known from the entire Kem Kem Beds, the other one being the holotype of the enigmatic theropod Deltadromeus. The generic name is a combination of the word Rebbach, in reference to "le territoire des Aït Rebbach", and the Greek word sauros meaning "lizard". "Aït Rebbach" is likely in allusion to the Khebbash tribe, a seminomadic Berber Ait Atta tribe which resisted French occupation during the Pacification of Morocco. The specific name garasbae derives from the Gara Sbaa site where the holotype was unearthed. While Lavocat's description was brief and only figured the scapula and dorsal vertebra, American paleontologist Jeffrey A . Wilson and French paleontologist Ronan Allain described the specimen in more detail in 2015.

In 1996, Canadian paleontologist Dale Russell assigned an isolated posterior dorsal centrum, several isolated teeth, and a cervical (neck) neural spine, all of which had been found by Moroccan fossil hunters in the Kem Kem Beds, to R. garasbae. Although the centrum is still assigned to R. garasbae, the teeth and cervical neural spine cannot be compared with the holotype due to lack of overlap. This led Wilson and Allain (2015) to exclude these fossils from the R. garasbae hypodigm (all of the available specimens that a researcher assigns to a specific species). Several caudal vertebrae and an isolated dorsal vertebra from the Kem Kem Beds have been assigned to R. garasbae, however their statuses are indeterminate according to Wilson and Allain (2015) and cannot be confidently assigned to the species. Additionally, an isolated tooth, MNHN-MRS 1524a, was discovered by Lavocat on an expedition to the Kem Kem Beds, though its exact geographic and geologic origins are unknown. It has been assigned to R. garasbae, though Wilson and Allain (2015) opted not to include it in the R. garasbae hypodigm because of a lack of overlap and the presence of a second, distinct sauropod in the Kem Kem Beds. In a 2020 monograph on the Kem Kem Beds, German-Moroccan paleontologist Nizar Ibrahim and colleagues described an isolated rebbachisaurid tooth that had been found in the Aferdou N’Chaft, which corresponds to the Douira Formation of the Kem Kem Beds. Although coming from a different formation, Ibrahim and colleagues (2020) stated it may come from Rebbachisaurus or a narrow-toothed titanosaurid.

=== Formerly assigned species ===
==== R. tamesnensis ====
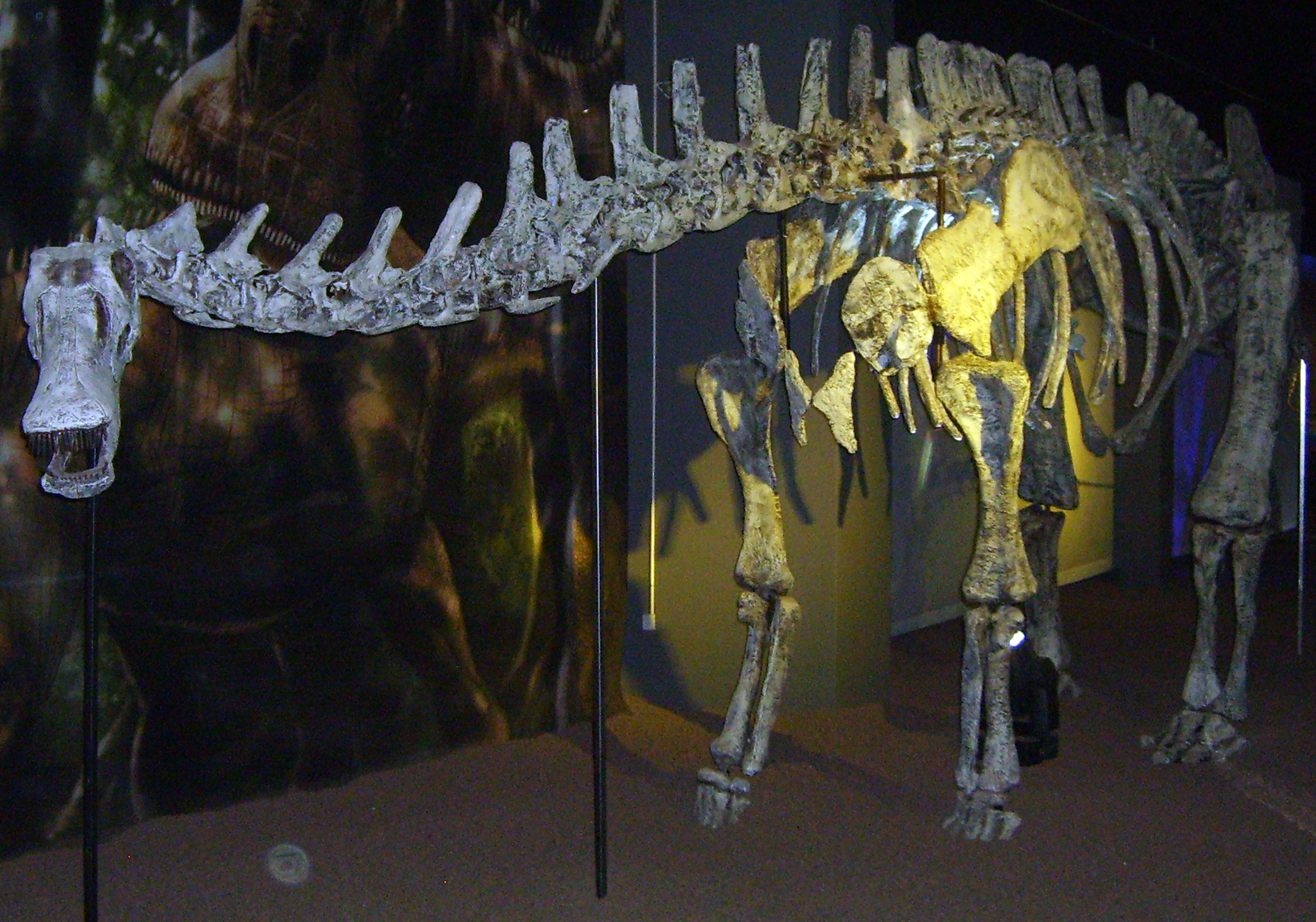
Skeleton of Limaysaurus tessonei, a species formerly assigned to Rebbachisaurus

Between 1946 and 1959, nine expeditions were mounted to explore Cretaceous-aged outcrops of the Continental Intercalaire Formation. In 1960, French paleontologist Albert de Lapparent described a new species of Rebbachisaurus, R. tamesnensis, supposedly on the basis of two humeri and two femora, but he failed to pick a holotype specimen. This specimen was unearthed from the Gall locality, an outcrop of the Jurassic-aged Tiourarén Formation in Niger. The material assigned to R. tamesnensis also included four isolated teeth, a dentary fragment with three teeth, over 100 vertebrae, six chevrons, twelve ribs, five scapulae, an ilium, two ischia, and numerous limb elements. The material of this taxon was collected from multiple localities across the Sahara, such as several sites in the Elrhaz Formation of Niger, and its referral to one species was not justified by Lapparent. In 1995, Argentine paleontologists Jorge Calvo and Leonardo Salgado stated that R. tamesnensis was not a species or even a diplodocoid, but instead a camarasaurid based on its spatulate teeth, distally expanded ischium, and the presence of a hyposphene-hypantrum in the dorsal vertebrae. This was also proposed by American paleontologist John C. McIntosh in a 1990 issue of The Dinosauria. However, in 2009 British paleontologist Philip D. Mannion hypothesized that R. tamesnensis was actually a chimera (a species named based on fossils of several different species) of Jobaria and Nigersaurus fossils, which was supported by other studies.

In 2025, Mannion and American paleontologist Andrew J. Moore analyzed the material of R. tamesnensis and found that only one specimen, an anterior (towards front) caudal vertebra that Lapparent had identified as a dorsal vertebra, bore rebbachisaurid synapomorphies. This fossil was collected from the Djoua Valley of Algeria in an outcrop likely deriving from the Gara Samani Formation. It lacks overlap with any specimens of R. garasbae, though it is comparable to an isolated rebbachisaurid vertebra that had been found in the Kem Kem Beds. Additionally, their study stated that R. tamesnensis is an indeterminate rebbachisaurine and a nomen dubium.

==== R. tessonei ====
In 1988, a well-preserved sauropod skeleton including much of the posterior region of the skull and postcranial material was unearthed from a locality of the Cenomanian-aged Candeleros Formation in Neuquén Province, Patagonia, Argentina. This skeleton was made the holotype of a new species of Rebbachisaurus, R. tessonei, by Argentine paleontologists Jorge Calvo and Leonardo Salgado in 1995. However, in 2004 Salgado and colleagues placed R. tessonei in its own genus, Limaysaurus.

== Description ==
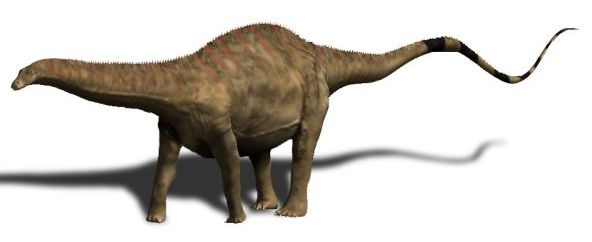
Life restoration of R. garasbae

Rebbachisaurus is a medium-sized sauropod, though it is among the largest rebbachisaurids known. Previous studies estimated Rebbachisaurus was around 20 meters (66 ft) long, comparable in size to Apatosaurus. Recent studies state that Rebbachisaurus was around 14 meters (46 ft) long and weighed 7–12 metric tons (7.7–13.2 short tons). Being a rebbachisaurid sauropod, Rebbachisaurus likely possessed a relatively short neck and long tail, tall neural spines, highly pneumatised (air containing) skeleton, robust limbs, longer hindlimbs than forelimbs, long, thin teeth, and possibly a highly specialized skull, like Nigersaurus.

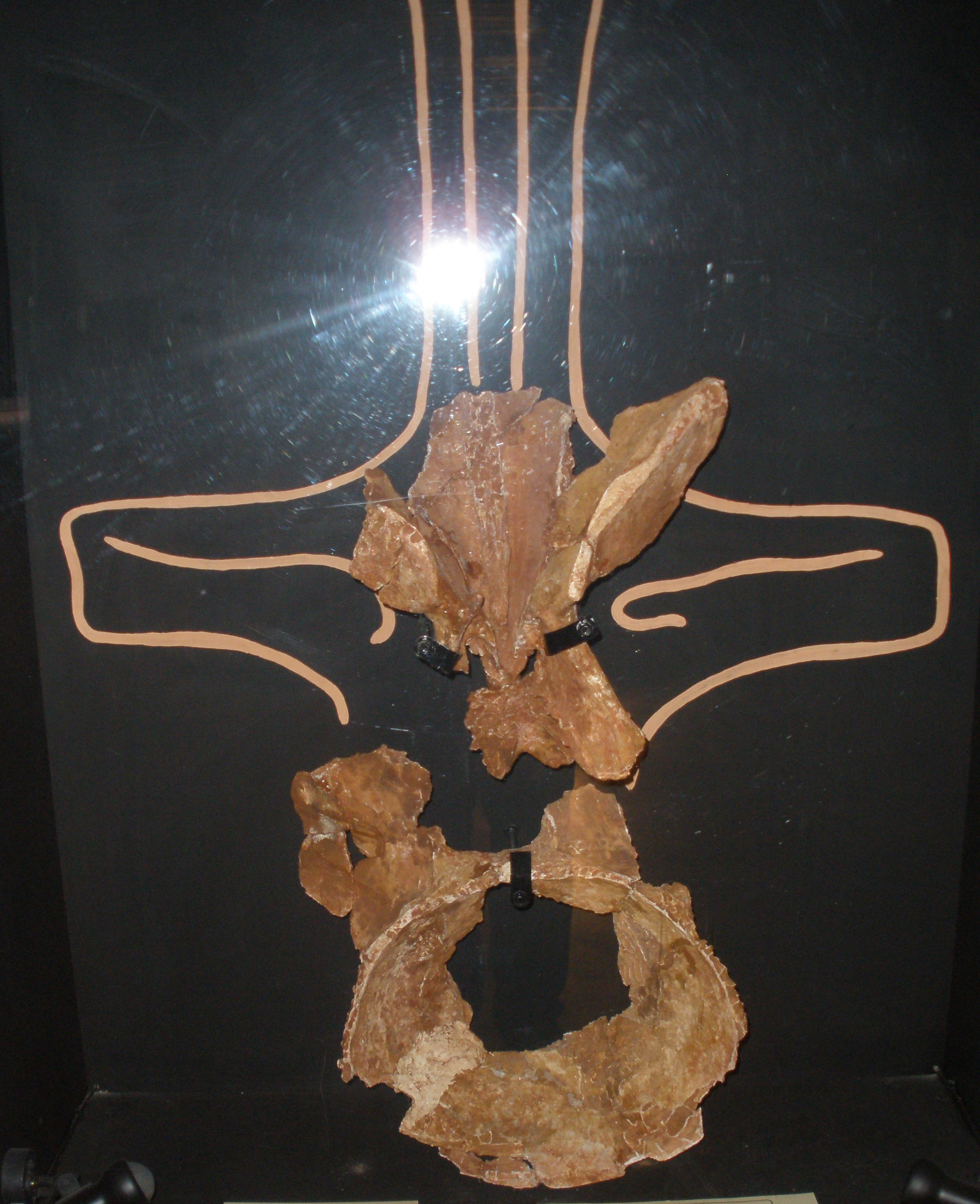
An incomplete dorsal vertebra in anterior view

Only one dorsal vertebra from the holotype is relatively complete. Its estimated total height is 145 centimeters (57 in), as it is missing the distal most 5% of its length. This makes it significantly taller than those observed in South American rebbachisaurids, which are only around 50 centimeters (20 in) in height. The centrum is relatively small, making up only 1/5 of the total height. Likewise the neural canal (a gap in the vertebra for the spinal cord to travel through) is small relative to the vertebral height, whereas the zygapophyses (projections of vertebrae that connect to others in the vertebral column) and the neural spines are very tall relatively. The infradiapophyseal (area running between the diapophyses, projections of bone that articulate with the tuberculum (top head) of the rib) region of the neural arch (the posterior bony projection that encloses the spinal cord) is blanketed in a complex web of laminae (ridges on vertebrae that divide pneumatic chambers), many of which have features unique to the genus. The condyle (a protuberance at the anterior end of the centrum) is concave but extends only 3 centimeters (1.2 in) from the condylar rim (where the condyle ends and the rest of the vertebra starts). Its lower portion is much flatter than its top portion, which projects strongly dorsally (from the top), like in the condyles of Diplodocus, Apatosaurus, and Haplocanthosaurus. In contrast, the condyles of macronarians are strongly convex while those of non-neosauropods are flat. As for its proportions, the centrum measures 22 centimeters (8.7 in) in length, 23.1 centimeters (9.1 in) in height, and 22 centimeters (8.7 in) in width, resulting in nearly subequal lengths and a square shape. Its centrum is opisthocoelus (anteriorly convex and posteriorly concave) with large, subtriangular pleurocoels (large fossae on the lateral (side) faces of centra), which held extensive air sacs. Rebbachisaurus is unique amongst sauropods in that the infrazygapophyseal region of the neural arch is subequal in height to the centrum.

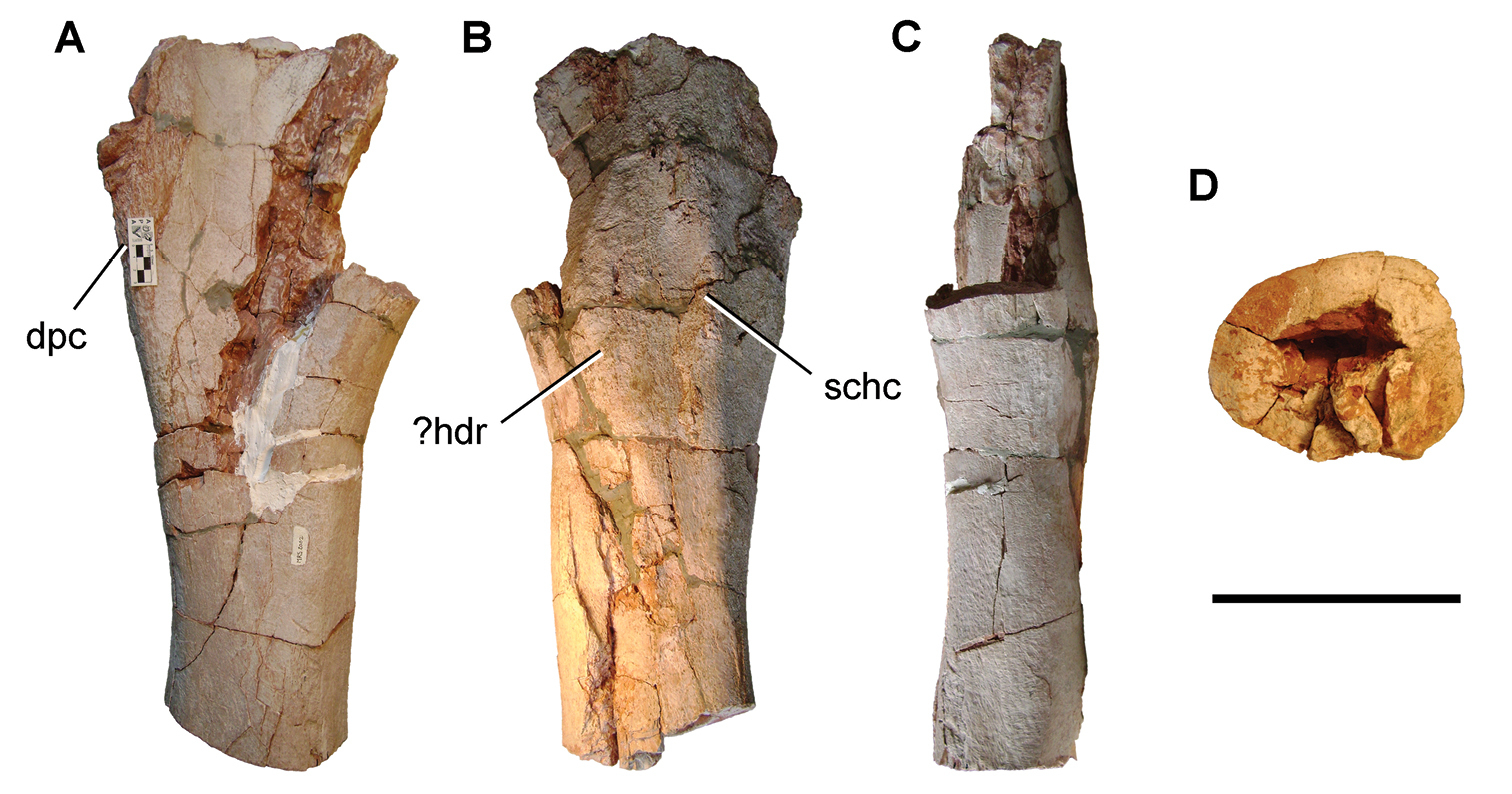
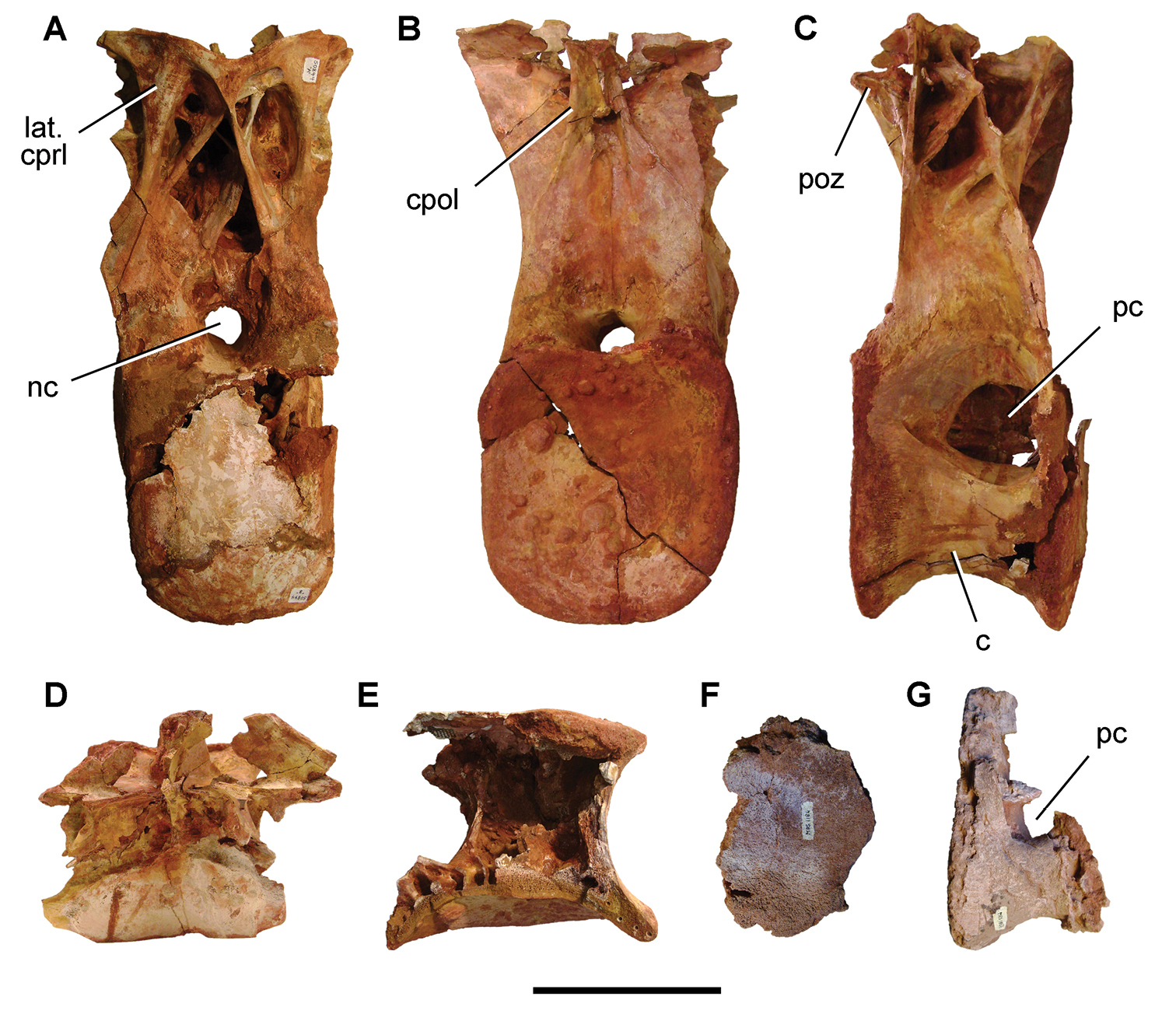
Bones of Rebbachisaurus; humerus (top) and dorsal vertebrae (bottom) from the holotype (A-E) and NMC 50844 (F-G)

Unlike those of other sauropods, Rebbachisaurus' dorsal parapophyses (an extension of bone that articulates with the capitulum (bottom head) of the ribs) project almost as far laterally, around 30 centimeters (12 in) from the mid-sagittal plane, as do the diapophyses. Additionally, the centroprezygapophyseal (a lamina extending from the centrum to the prezygapophyses) lamina and centropostzygapophyseal (a lamina extending from the centrum to the postzygapophyses) lamina intersect with the anterior centroparapophyseal (a lamina extending from the anterior end of the centrum to the parapophyses) lamina and posterior centrodiapophyseal (a lamina extending from the posterior end of the centrum to the diapophyses) lamina in this area to form an 'M' shape, a trait shared only with Xenoposeidon. Three sacral neural spines are known though their exact serial position is unclear. Wilson and Allain (2015) stated they were sacral spines 1–3, though this was only based on comparisons with Nigersaurus. The spines are lightly fused together with a thin, low ridge, similar to those present in Giraffatitan and Tataouinea. When compared to the dorsal neural spines, the caudal neural spines are more elongate, transversely slender at the base, and taper transversely at a point more distant from the apex than in the dorsals. This causes the caudals to have a diamond-shaped appearance, in contrast to the petal-shaped spines of dicraeosaurids and Limaysaurus.

As in all rebbachisaurids, the scapula of Rebbachisaurus is paddle or racquet-like. It is also subequal in length to the posterior dorsal vertebrae, which are vastly vertically elongated, another characteristic unique to the taxon. Its acromial (a bony ridge on the lower part of the scapula) notch is also not widely open as it is in Nigersaurus and an unnamed rebbachisaurid from the Isle of Wight. Unique to only Rebbachisaurus and Rayososaurus, a deep fossa (a depression in bone) extends across the scapula that divides the acromial ridge from the scapular blade. Similar to Rayososaurus and Cathartesaura, the scapular blade and acromian process (a projection of bone) form a V-shaped angle of around 20°. The scapulae of derived rebbachisaurids like Limaysaurus and an unnamed taxon from the Isle of Wight notably differ from those of these genera in this regard. Limaysaurus and the Isle of Wight taxon, two derived rebbachisaurids, have a U-shaped angle between their scapular blade and acromian process instead of a V-shaped one. This suggests that the U-shaped angle evolved later in Rebbachisauridae, while the V-shaped angle is the basal condition.

The humerus is not fully preserved, but was estimated to be around 100–105 centimeters (39–41 in) in complete length. The element strongly expanded proximally, as the proximal transverse width is around 40% of the estimated total length while the distal transverse width is only around 24%. The humeral robustness ratio, a ratio between the minimal circumference and total humeral length, of Rebbachisaurus is 0.43-45. This is comparable to Nigersaurus and Limaysaurus but lower than that of Comahuesaurus and Suuwassea. Most of the pelvic material has been missing from the MNHN, though there is a fragment of the right ischium preserved. Its pubic peduncle (a robust process at the anterior end of the ischium that articulates with the pubis) is elongate, though its incompleteness makes it difficult to compare to those of other rebbachisaurids.

== Classification ==
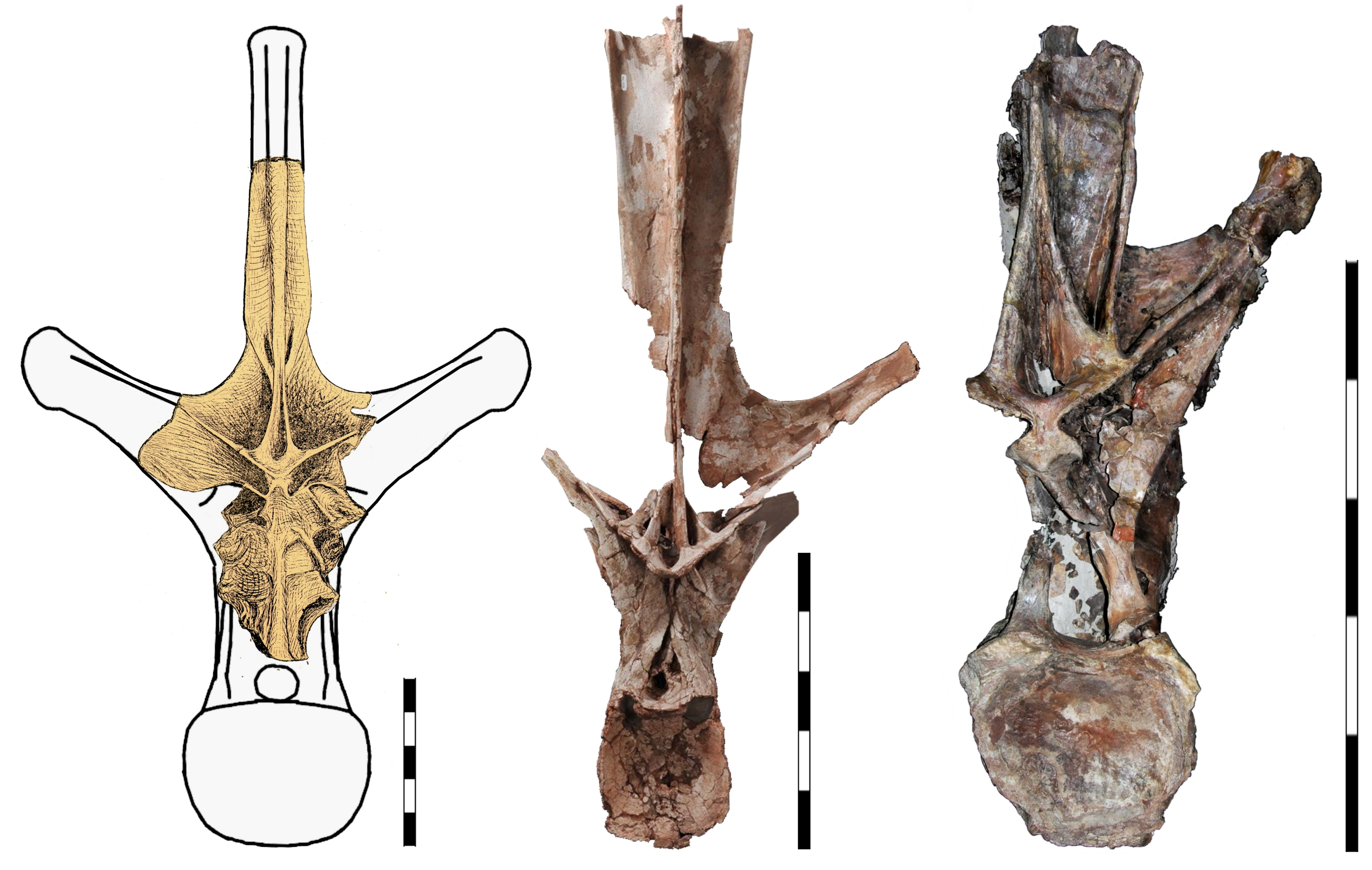
Comparison of a Rebbachisaurus vertebra (middle) with the vertebrae of the rebbachisaurids Maraapunisaurus (left) and Histriasaurus (right).

Rebbachisaurus is the type genus of the family Rebbachisauridae and subfamily Rebbachisaurinae. Rebbachisaurus was the first rebbachisaurid to be discovered or named. Prior to being recognized as a diplocodoid rebbachisaurid, Rebbachisaurus was placed in the families Camarasauridae and Haplocanthosauridae, although its affinities remained unclear. Rebbachisauridae was a clade created by Bonaparte (1997) after he recognized that Rebbachisaurus, "R". (now Limaysaurus) tessonei, and Rayososaurus formed their own family of diplodocoids. This family was then defined as the clade as all diplodocoids more closely related to Rebbachisaurus than Diplodocus by Salgado and colleagues (2004). The name Rebbachisaurinae was first used by Wilson and Allain (2015) and was stated to include Rebbachisaurus, Demandasaurus, and Nigersaurus. However, many rebbachisaurids are known from isolated or incomplete material, leading to their affinities within the family being unclear. The related genus Demandasaurus from Spain was described by Fernández-Baldor and colleagues (2011), and along with other animal groups that span the Cretaceous of Africa and Europe, this indicates that carbonate platforms connected these landmasses across the Tethys Sea. This was supported by Federico Fanti and colleagues (2013) in their description of the rebbachisaurine Tataouinea from Tunisia, which was more related to the European form than to Nigersaurus and Rebbachisaurus, despite being from Africa, then part of the supercontinent Gondwana. Pneumatisation of the rebbachisaurid skeleton evolved progressively, culminating in the rebbachisaurines. The cladogram from Fanti and colleagues' (2015) description of Tataouinea is shown below.

- Rebbachisauridae
  - Amazonsaurus
  - - Zapalasaurus
    - Histriasaurus
    - Comahuesaurus
    - Khebbashia
      - Limaysaurinae
        - Cathartesaura
        - Limaysaurus
      - Rebbachisaurinae
        - Katepensaurus
        - - Nigersaurus
          - - Rebbachisaurus
            - Demandasaurus
            - Tataouinea

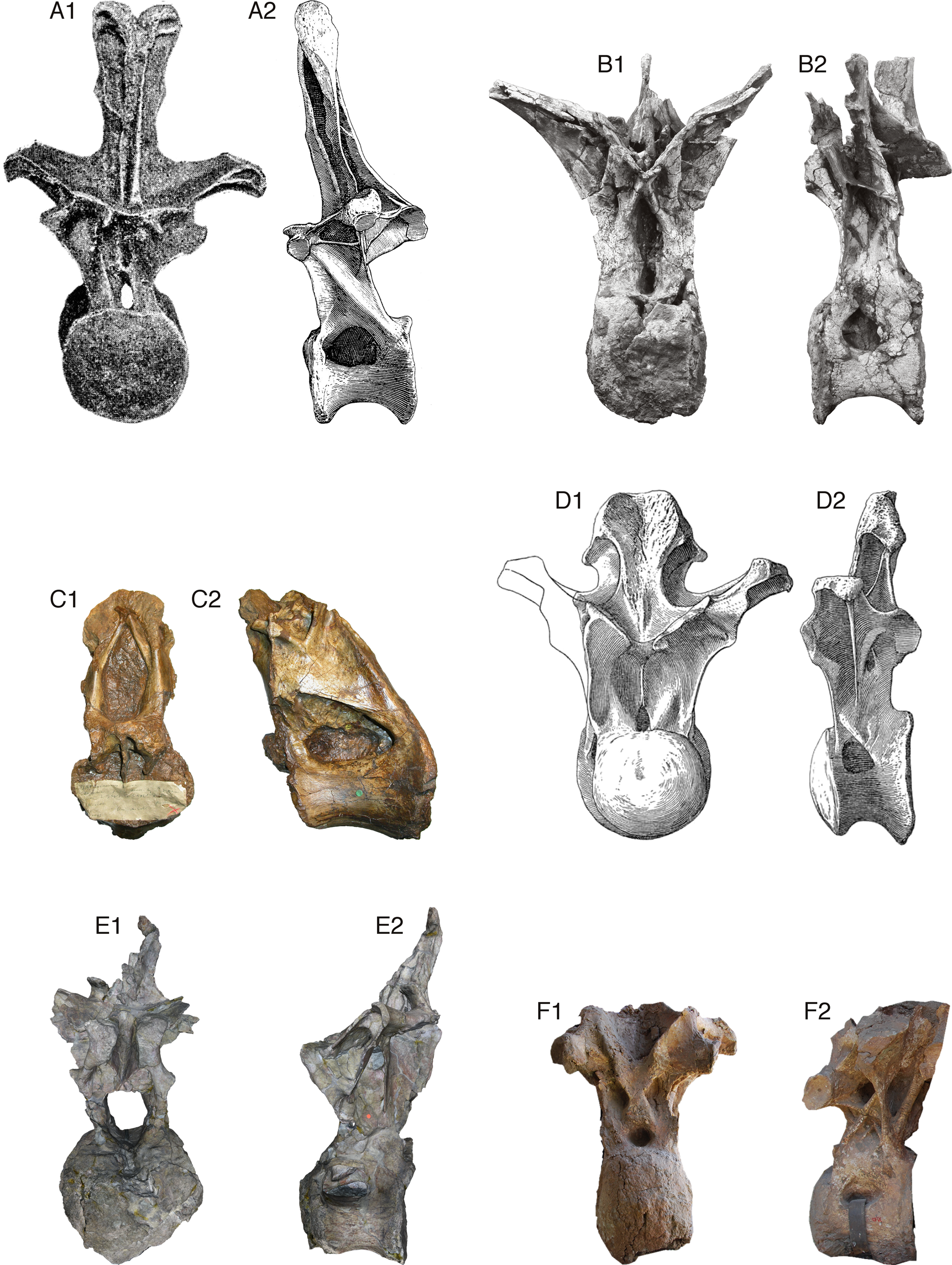
A dorsal vertebra of Rebbachisaurus (B) compared to those of Diplodocus (A), Xenoposeidon (C), Camarasaurus (D), Giraffatitan (E), and Yongjinglong (F).

Studies like Wilson and Allain (2015) have hypothesized that Rebbachisauridae was divided into two geographic clades: Limaysaurinae, a South American clade, and Nigersaurinae, a Euro-African clade. Mannion and colleagues (2019) pointed out that since Nigersaurus was found to be the sister taxon of all other nigersaurines in some studies, a Rebbachisaurinae clade may not necessarily include Nigersaurus itself (as well as the fact that the position of Rebbachisaurus could change in future analyses), and supported the continued use of the name Nigersaurinae over Rebbachisaurinae for all rebbachisaurids more closely related to Nigersaurus than to Limaysaurus. They found that nigersaurines were restricted to North Africa and Europe, and that Limaysaurinae was strictly known from Argentina. The same year, the Brazilian palaeontologist Rafael Matos Lindoso and colleagues used the name Nigersaurinae following Mannion's recommendation, and found Itapeuasaurus from Brazil to group with the nigersaurines, thereby expanding this lineage more widely (making palaeobiogeographic hypotheses for this group less reliable).

However, Rebbachisaurinae has seen more use by other authors due to its priority over Nigersaurinae. This is due to the fact that Rebbachisaurus was named earlier, giving it priority over Nigersaurinae due to ICZN Article 36, which states that all family-group names associated with a taxon are created when it is named. In 2015, Fanti and colleagues erected Khebbashia, a group including Limaysaurinae and Rebbachisaurinae, as the least inclusive group including Rebbachisaurus, Nigersaurus, and Limaysaurus. Additionally, in their 2025 description of the rebbachisaurid Cienciargentina, María Edith Simón and Salgado did not find Limaysaurinae, Nigersaurinae, or Rebbachisaurinae to be clades but instead found Limaysaurus, Katepensaurus, Rebbachisaurus, Nigersaurus, Demandasaurus, and Tataouinea to be members of Khebbashia of varying grades. In contrast, Lucas Lerzo and colleagues (2024) recovered Rebbachisaurinae and Nigersaurinae as separate clades. Additionally, Rebbachisaurus was found in a clade with rebbachisaurids typically included in Limaysaurinae whereas Nigersaurinae was composed of Euro-African genera and the South American genus Agustinia. Below is the cladogram from Lerzo and colleagues (2024):

- Diplodocoidea
  - Flagellicaudata
  - Rebbachisauridae
    - Amazonsaurus
    - - - Zapalasaurus
        - - Campananeyen
          - Sidersaura
      - - Itapeuasaurus
        - - - Lavocatisaurus
            - Comahuesaurus
          - Khebbashia
            - Nigersaurinae
              - Agustinia
              - - Nigersaurus
                - - Tataouinea
                  - Demandasaurus
            - Rebbachisaurinae
              - Rayososaurus
              - Rebbachisaurus
              - - Limaysaurus
                - - Katepensaurus
                  - Cathartesaura

== Paleobiology ==
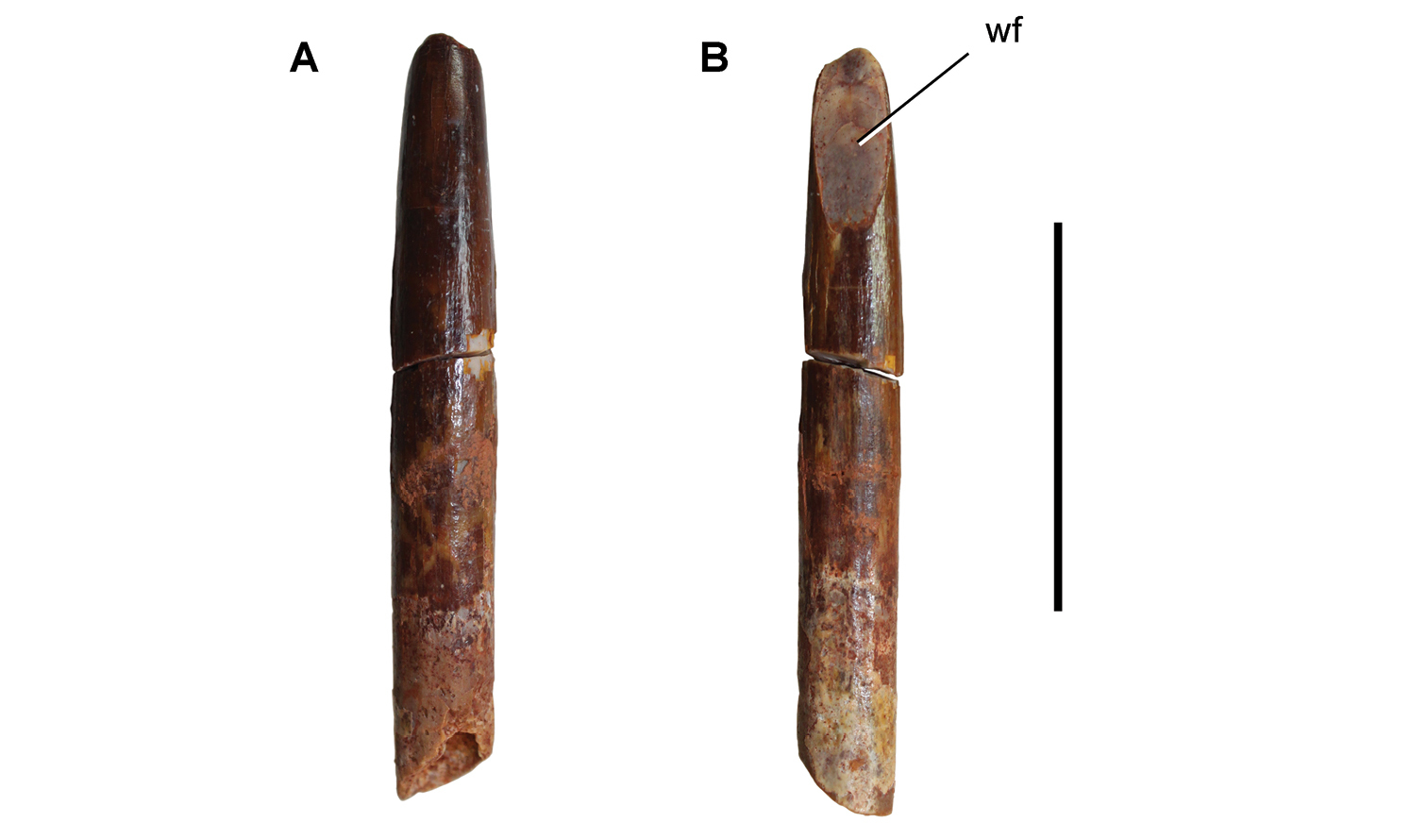
An isolated sauropod tooth possibly belonging to Rebbachisaurus

In 2017, the Argentinian palaeontologist Lucio M. Ibiricu and colleagues examined the postcranial skeletal pneumaticity in the skeletons of rebbachisaurids, and suggested that it was an adaptation for lowering the density of the skeleton, and that this could have decreased the muscle energy needed to move the body, as well as the heat generated in the process. Since several rebbachisaurids inhabited latitudes that would have been tropical to subtropical in the Middle Cretaceous, this pneumaticity may have helped the animals cope with the very high temperatures. According to Ibiricu and colleagues, this adaptation may be a reason why rebbachisaurids were the only group of diplodocoids that survived into the Late Cretaceous.

In a 2011 study, American paleontologist John Whitlock studied the dental microwear of a tooth assigned to Rebbachisaurus, however this assignment is not definitive because of lack of overlap with the holotype. The faces of the tooth featured long and narrow scratches with minimal cross scratching. Several pits were found which were subcircular and quite large, in contrast to the giant pits observed in Dicraeosaurus teeth. The dental microwear of Rebbachisaurus consisted of fine subparallel scratches and a high proportion of pits. Some rebbachisaurids, such as Nigersaurus, feature skulls with large, square snouts, suggesting that Rebbachisaurus may have possessed one too. These two traits suggest that it was a generalist ground-height browser. Based on a tooth possibly coming from Rebbachisaurus, Ibrahim and colleagues (2020) noted differences in wear patterns between Nigersaurus and an isolated tooth that may indicate that Rebbachisaurus lacked the derived, self-supporting tooth rows found in Nigersaurus.

== Paleoecology ==
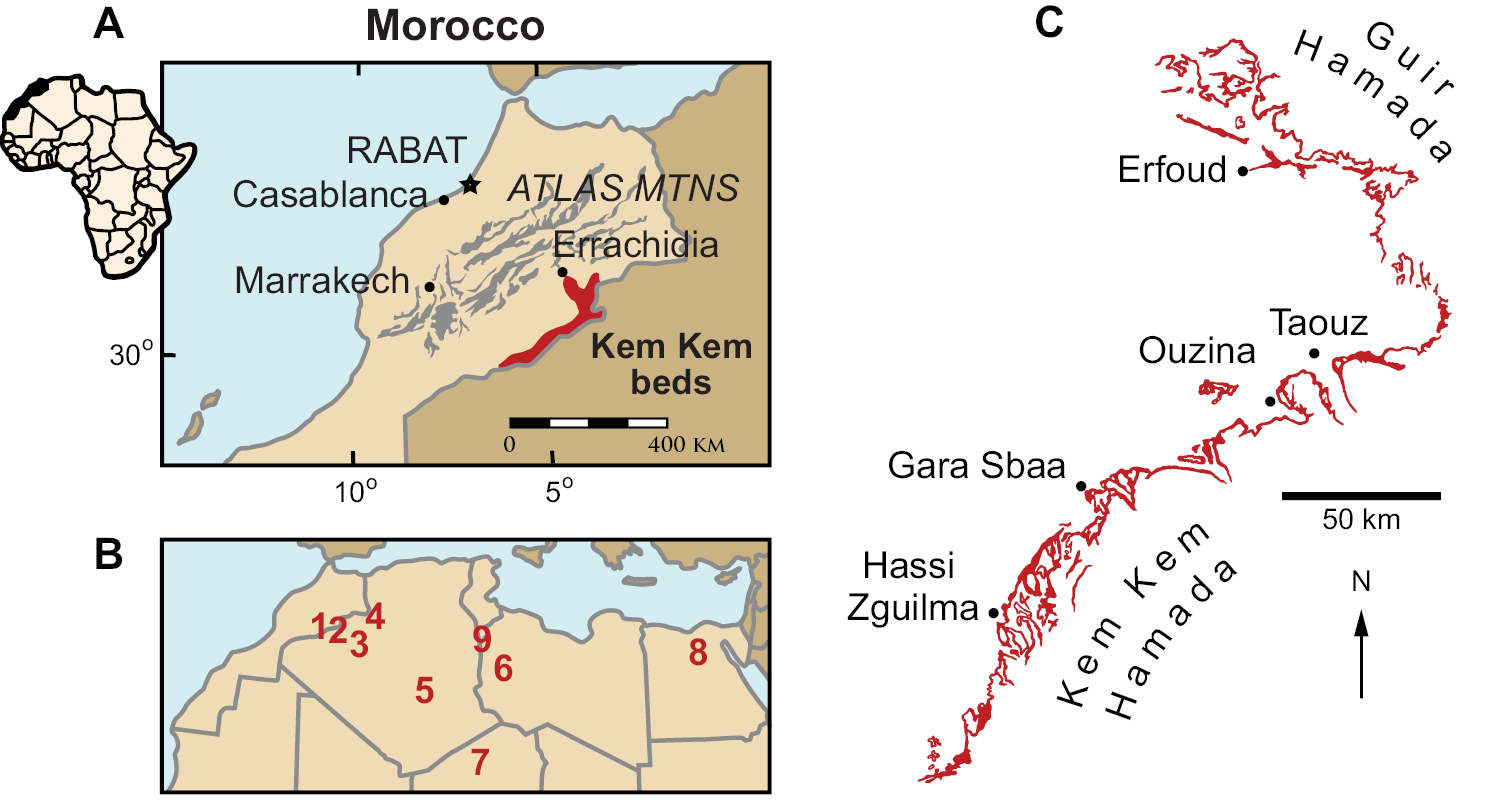
Geographical setting of the Kem Kem region and its outcrops

The composition of the dinosaur fauna of North Africa at this time is an anomaly, as there are fewer herbivorous dinosaur species relative to carnivorous dinosaur species than in most fossil sites. This abundance of theropods, a group of largely carnivorous dinosaurs, compared to that of non-theropods was dubbed "Stromer's Riddle", which, despite suggestions that this is due to ecological, preservation, or other biases, can be supported by the fossil record. This over prevalence of theropods indicates that there could have been niche partitioning between the different theropod clades, with spinosaurids consuming fish while other groups hunted herbivorous dinosaurs. Isotopic evidence supports this as there were greater quantities of sizable, terrestrial animals in the diets of carcharodontosaurids and ceratosaurs from both the Kem Kem Beds and Elrhaz Formation. North Africa was dominated by a triumvirate of Abelisauroidea, Spinosauridae, and Carcharodontosauridae during the mid-Cretaceous, with all of these groups present in the Kem Kem Beds, Echkar, Elrhaz, and Bahariya Formations. The faunal composition of mid-Cretaceous North Africa and South America features many similarities, such as the presence of mesosuchian crocodiles, araripemyd turtles, and coelacanth fishes. Additionally, the Early-mid Cretaceous of North Africa and South America saw the rise of rebbachisaurids, titanosaurs, spinosaurids, and carcharodontosaurids.

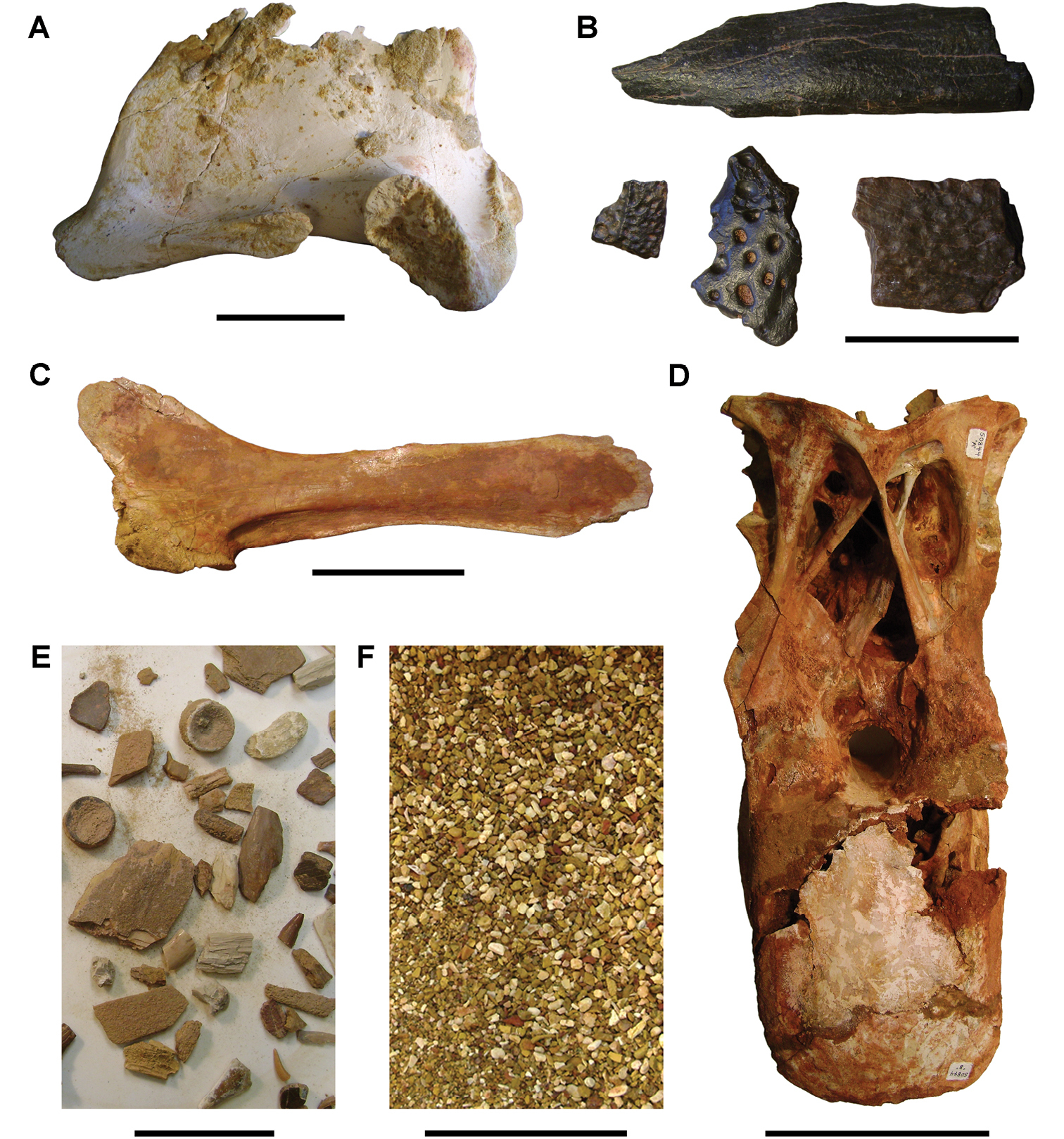
Several assorted fossils from the Kem Kem Beds, including a vertebra (D) of Rebbachisaurus

The Kem Kem Beds is composed of three geologic formations: the Gara Sbaa Formation, the Douria Formation, and the Izefouane Formation. Isotopes from Carcharodontosaurus and Spinosaurus fossils suggest that the Kem Kem Beds witnessed a temporary monsoon season rather than constant rainfall, similar to modern conditions present in sub-tropical and tropical environments in Southeast Asia and Sub-Saharan Africa. This river system was freshwater based on the presence of lungfishes and other typically freshwater vertebrates. This indicates that the Kem Kem Beds had a wide variety of features, including river channels, river banks and sandbars. Fossils of giant fishes have been found in the Kem Kem Beds, including the sawskate Onchopristis, coelacanth Axelrodichthys, and bichir Bawitius. The Kem Kem Beds also preserves an abundance of crocodyliformes like the stomatosuchid Laganosuchus, the peirosaurid Hamadasuchus, and the pholidosaurid Elosuchus. This region also bore an abundance of pterosaurs like the toothed anhanguerids Siroccopteryx, Coloborhynchus, and Nicorhynchus and the edentulous azhdarchoids Alanqa, Afrotapejara, and Leptostomia.

The Kem Kem Beds preserve many dinosaur fossils. Rebbachisaurus is the only named Kem Kem sauropod, though an indeterminate somphospondylian titanosauriform and an indeterminate titanosaur, one comparable in size to the giant Paralititan, are known as well. Ornithischian fossils are extremely rare, only being represented from an isolated thyreophoran tooth and footprints of an ornithopod, possibly similar to Iguanodon. As for theropods, many are known, including one or two distinct indeterminate abelisaurids, the carcharodontosaurids Carcharodontosaurus and Sauroniops, indeterminate noasaurids, and the spinosaurids Spinosaurus and Sigilmassasaurus, if it is distinct. However, many of these dinosaurs are known from isolated or incomplete remains, have complicated taxonomies, or are under study.
