= Geology of Niger =

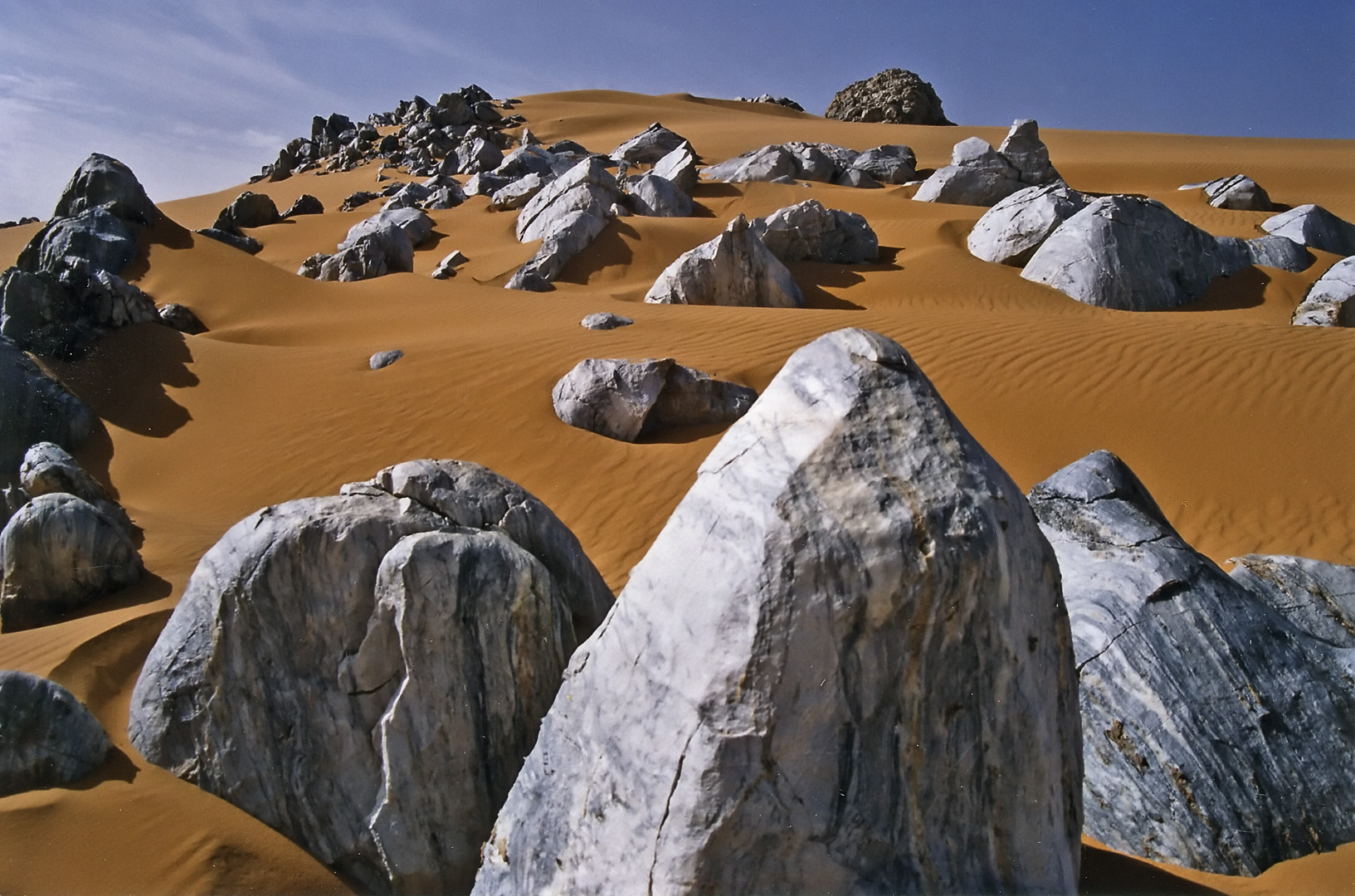

The geology of Niger comprises very ancient igneous and metamorphic crystalline basement rocks in the west, more than 2.2 billion years old formed in the late Archean and Proterozoic eons of the Precambrian. The Volta Basin, Air Massif and the Iullemeden Basin began to form in the Neoproterozoic and Paleozoic, along with numerous ring complexes, as the region experienced events such as glaciation and the Pan-African orogeny. Today, Niger has extensive mineral resources due to complex mineralization and laterite weathering including uranium, molybdenum, iron, coal, silver, nickel, cobalt and other resources.

== Stratigraphy, tectonics and geologic history ==
The oldest rocks in Niger, along the border with Burkina Faso and northern Ghana predate the 2.2 billion year old Proterozoic Birimian rocks common in much of West Africa. The pre-Birimian crystalline basement rocks include gneiss and migmatite metamorphosed to amphibolite grade in the sequence of metamorphic facies. The Liptako region, in the west has amphibolite, chlorite-schist, meta-andesite, meta-arkose, micaceous quartzites and garnet gneiss which are younger. These rocks formed after a granite-gneiss complex in the area, but before the mudstones, tuff, quartzite, conglomerate and greywacke of the Amarasinde and Bellekoire beds. These Upper Birimian Supergroup rocks are intruded by younger granites.

The Air Massif began to form in the Precambrian. More than half of the basement rock in the massif is metamorphic, including the Edoukel mesozonal micaschist, Azanguerene gneiss, Tafourfouzete letpynite and possible ophiolite of the Aouzeueur formation.

=== Neoproterozoic (1 billion-539 million years ago) ===
The Volta Basin syncline along the border with Burkina Faso contains Neoproterozoic rocks, with the oldest rocks near the edge of the basin. After the 50 percent of basement rocks that are metamorphic, the rest of the rocks in the Air Massif Renatt type and Dabaga type granite, which formed during the Pan-African orogeny mountain building event 600 million years ago.

=== Paleozoic (539-251 million years ago) ===
During the Cambrian as multi-cellular life became commonplace, anorogenic magmatism formed ring complexes, that now comprise 30 different massifs in the Niger-Nigerian Younger Granite Province. The oldest, Cambrian massifs formed in the north.

Throughout the Paleozoic ring complexes with significant variety in structure and rock type formed in the Air Massif. In fact, the Air Massif has the largest ring-dike in the world, with a diameter of 65 kilometers. Geologists subdivide the different ring complexes into three different types. The Taghouaji-type has plutonic alkaline rocks and may have peraluminous granites while the Goudai-type is mainly acid volcanic rocks. The Ofoud-type is the most varied, encompassing gabbros, granites and anorthosite.

The Iullemeden Basin at Tamesna began to form in the Paleozoic. The center of the basin was uplifted by the Hercynian orogeny to form the Hoggar Mountains. Sedimentary rocks from the Paleozoic, thicken toward the mountains and to the south. East of Tamesna, Cambrian and Ordovician sedimentary rocks are up to 500 meters thick and include conglomerates and sandstones. There is an unconformity between these deposits and glacial sediments, associated with the widespread glaciation and global cooling of the Ordovician-Silurian extinction event. In ascending order, glacial deposits are overlain by Early Silurian graptolite shales, Devonian sandstones and shales and Early Carboniferous deltaic sandstones.

A coal bearing layer, likely tied to a marine transgression is overlain by shales and limestones, which contain coral and conodont fossils.

=== Mesozoic-Cenozoic (251-66 million years ago) ===
A marine transgression in the Cenomanian, during the late Mesozoic topped off the Iulllemeden Basin with marine sedimentary rocks, often on top of Early Cretaceous terrestrial sedimentary rocks. The region remained flooded well into the Cenozoic, throughout the Paleocene, before drying out and shifting from marine sediment deposition to continental sediments.

== Hydrogeology ==
Hydrogeology in Niger is poorly researched. The Eocene Continental Terminal is an unconfined sandstone aquifer.

== Natural resource geology ==
Mined uranium is Niger's biggest export, but mining remains a relatively small part of GDP. The country also has gold and coal and deposits of tin and phosphate were mined in the past. Uranium is extracted from two concessions at Arlit and Akouta, more than 200 kilometers northwest of Agadez, with estimated reserves of 200,000 tons. Low global demand for uranium has driven down production for more than 30 years since 1986. There may be other reserves at Imouraren, Afasto Ouest, Abkorum-Azelik, Afasto Est, Tassa N'Taghalgue and Teguida N'Tessoun, with uranium concentrations ranging between 0.22 and 0.45 percent. Molybdenum is often produced as a byproduct of uranium mining. Niger also has vein-type copper deposits, with malachite and chalcopyrite associated with molybdenum, lithium and silver—or zinc and lead in the Proche-Tenere District. Native copper, chrysocolla and cuprite are found in sediments in the Agadez region.

Relatively low-grade coal formed in a small basin at Anou-Araren, with estimated reserves of 10 megatons. Because of its poor quality, it is mainly used to provide electricity for uranium mines. The Iullemeden Basin contains lignite and small amounts of petroleum. The Liptako area in the northeast is the terminus of the West African gold belt, which extends from the Atlantic in Ghana. It hosts gold in the Birimian greenstones of Tera-Gasso and Gorouel belts. The gold belt actually extends further east, past the Niger River, but is largely concealed by younger sediments and sedimentary rocks. Gold mineralization also occurs in shear-related quartz veins. Some gold has been freed from sulfides in these veins by laterite weathering due to heavy rainfall in the last 2.5 million years of the Quaternary. Silver mineralization occurs where greenstones and granite intrusions meet, in the same quartz veins that host gold and sulfides. The silver is typically mineralized within sphalerite, chalcopyrite, arsenopyrite, pyrite or covellite. One hundred thirty five kilometers south of Niamey, is the Tapoa phosphate deposit Neoproterozoic and Cambrian sedimentary rocks of the Volta Group. The Tahoua deposit, 375 kilometers northeast of the capital contains nodular apatite in Paleocene and Eocene sediments. The Tidekelt region has up to 25 million tons of salt brines, with a yield of 70 percent sodium chloride.

There are some indications of platinum in the Makalondi District, south of Liptako, associated with chromite lenses in gabbros, anorthosite and chloritoschists. Ophiolites in the Abuzegueur overthurst, in the Air region also show potential for platinum mineralization and may also have chromite, nickel and cobalt. The Fantio deposit in the Liptako area has heavily weathered ultra-mafic rocks, with 0.8 percent nickel, totaling up to as much as 200,000 tons. Makalondi, also in Liptako, hosts chromium concentrations of 5.1 to 17.4 percent.

Iron is common in Niger, in rocks from the Precambrian through the Cenozoic, although the Cenozoic rocks of the Termit-Agadem and Ader-Doutchi regions have the highest iron concentrations, at up to 55 percent. Pegmatite hosted, granite and sedimentary deposits of tin were mined commercially from 1984 until 1991 in the Air Massif. Today, only small scale artisanal mining continues.
