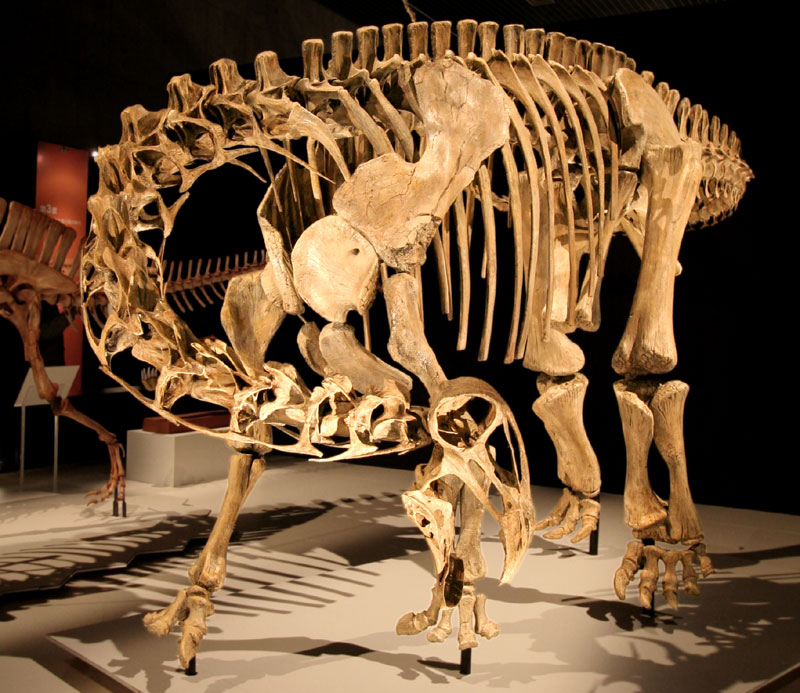
- Reconstructed skeleton in Japan

Scientific classification
- Kingdom: Animalia
- Phylum: Chordata
- Class: Reptilia
- Clade: Dinosauria
- Clade: Saurischia
- Clade: †Sauropodomorpha
- Clade: †Sauropoda
- Superfamily: †Diplodocoidea
- Family: †Rebbachisauridae
- Genus: †Nigersaurus; Sereno et al., 1999
- Species: †N. taqueti

Binomial name
- †Nigersaurus taqueti Sereno et al., 1999

= Nigersaurus =

Nigersaurus Temporal range: Aptian – Albian 115–105 Ma

Extinct genus of dinosaurs

Nigersaurus (/niːˈʒɛərsɔːrəs, ˈnaɪdʒərsɔːrəs/) is a genus of rebbachisaurid sauropod dinosaur that lived during the middle Cretaceous period, about 115 to 105 million years ago. It was discovered in the Elrhaz Formation in an area called Gadoufaoua, in Niger. Fossils of this dinosaur were first described in 1976, but it was only named Nigersaurus taqueti in 1999 after further and more complete remains were found and described. The genus name means "Niger reptile", and the specific name honours the palaeontologist Philippe Taquet, who discovered the first remains.

Small for a sauropod, Nigersaurus was about 9–14.1 m (30–46 ft) long, and had a short neck. It weighed around 1.9–4 t (2.1–4.4 short tons), comparable to a modern elephant. Its skull was very specialised for feeding, with large fenestrae and thin bones. It had a wide muzzle filled with more than 500 teeth, which were replaced at a rapid rate: around every 14 days. The jaws may have borne a keratinous sheath. Unlike other tetrapods, the tooth-bearing bones of its jaws were rotated transversely relative to the rest of the skull, so that all of its teeth were located far to the front. Its skeleton was highly pneumatised (filled with air spaces connected to air sacs), but the limbs were robustly built.

Nigersaurus and its closest relatives are grouped within the subfamily Rebbachisaurinae (formerly thought to be grouped in the eponymous Nigersaurinae) of the family Rebbachisauridae, which is part of the sauropod superfamily Diplodocoidea. Nigersaurus was probably a browser, and fed with its head close to the ground. The region of its brain that detected smell was underdeveloped, although its brain size was comparable to that of other dinosaurs. There has been debate on whether its head was habitually held downwards, or horizontally like other sauropods. It lived in a riparian habitat, and its diet probably consisted of soft plants, such as ferns, horsetails, and angiosperms. It is one of the most common fossil vertebrates found in the area, and shared its habitat with other dinosaurian megaherbivores, as well as large theropods and crocodylomorphs.

== History of discovery ==
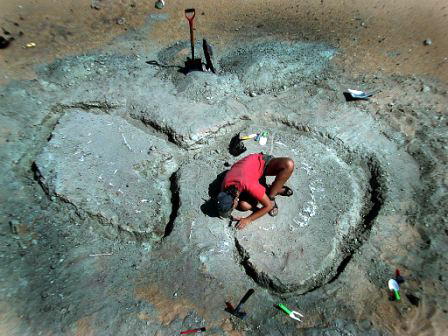
Excavation of a specimen in 2000

Remains thought to belong to Nigersaurus were first discovered during a 1965–1972 expedition to the Republic of Niger led by French paleontologist Philippe Taquet, and first mentioned in a paper published in 1976. Although a common genus, the dinosaur had been poorly known until more material of other individuals was discovered during expeditions led by American palaeontologist Paul Sereno in 1997 and 2000. The limited understanding of the genus was the result of poor preservation of its remains, which arises from the delicate and highly pneumatic construction (filled with air spaces connected to air sacs) of the skull and skeleton, in turn causing disarticulation of the fossils. Some of the skull fossils were so thin that a strong light beam was visible through them. Therefore, no intact skulls or articulated skeletons have been found, and these specimens represent the most complete known rebbachisaurid remains.

Nigersaurus was named and described in more detail by Sereno and colleagues only in 1999, based on remains of newly found individuals. The same article also named Jobaria, another sauropod from Niger. The genus name Nigersaurus ("Niger reptile") is a reference to the country where it was discovered, and the specific name taqueti honours Taquet, who was the first to organise large-scale palaeontological expeditions to Niger. The holotype specimen (MNN GAD512) consists of a partial skull and neck. Limb material and a scapula (shoulder blade) found nearby were also referred to the same specimen. These fossils are housed at the National Museum of Niger.

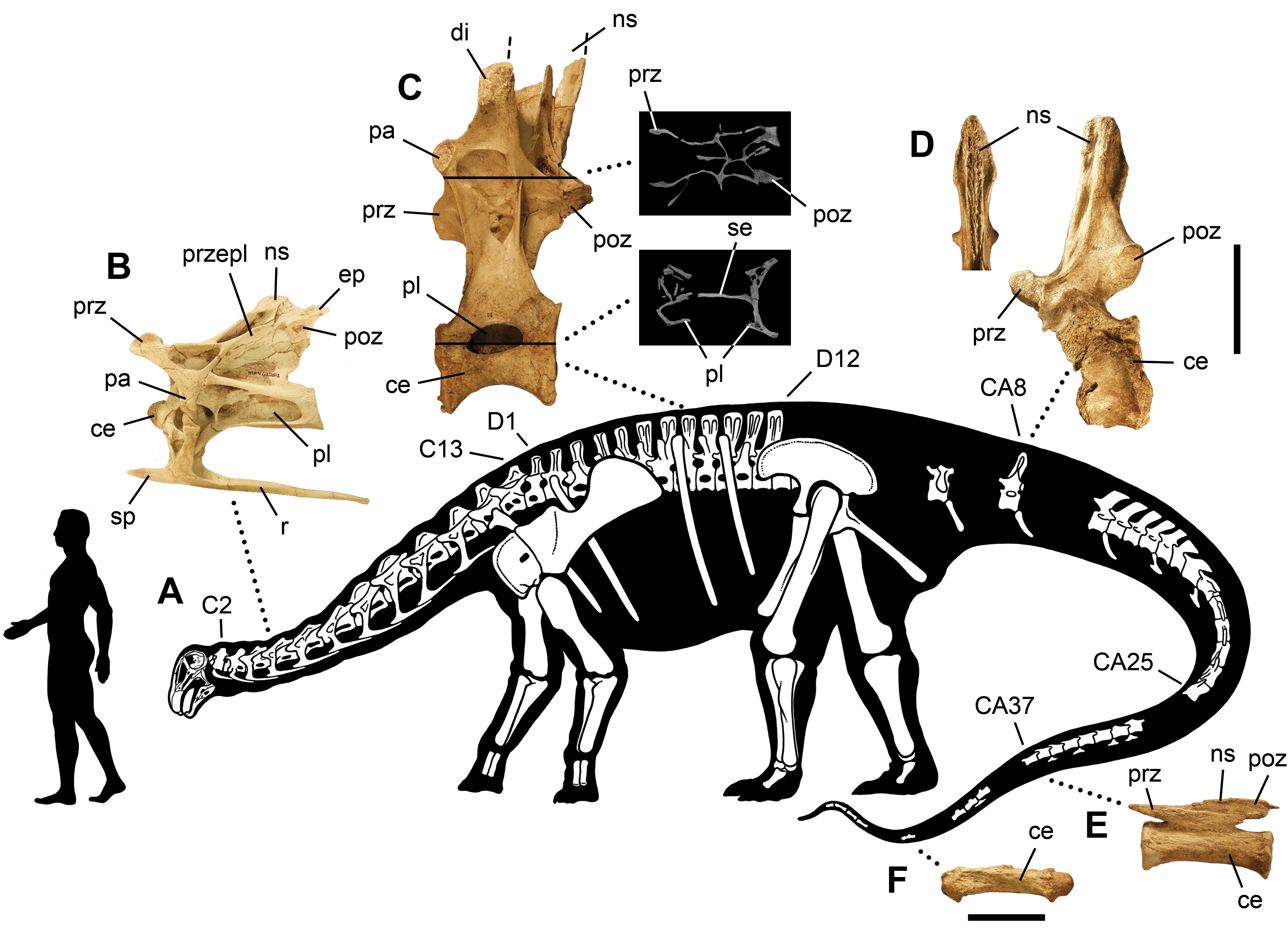
Skeletal diagram showing known elements and size comparison

Sereno and the American palaeontologist Jeffrey A. Wilson provided the first detailed description of the skull and feeding adaptations in 2005. In 2007, a more detailed description of the skeleton was published by Sereno ad colleagues, based on a specimen discovered ten years earlier. The fossils, along with a reconstructed skeleton mount and a plastic model of the head and neck, were subsequently presented at the National Geographic Society in Washington. Nigersaurus was dubbed a "Mesozoic cow" in the press, and Sereno stressed that it was the most unusual dinosaur he had ever seen. He likened its physical appearance to Darth Vader and a vacuum cleaner, and compared its tooth shear with a conveyor belt and sharpened piano keys.

Numerous Nigersaurus specimens collected by French and American expeditions remain to be described. Teeth similar to those of Nigersaurus have been found on the Isle of Wight and in Brazil, but it is unknown whether they belonged to relatives of this taxon, or to titanosaurs, whose remains have been found in the vicinity. A lower jaw assigned to the titanosaur Antarctosaurus is likewise similar to that of Nigersaurus, but may have evolved convergently.

== Description ==
Like all sauropods, Nigersaurus was a quadruped with a small head, thick hind legs, and a prominent tail. Among that clade, Nigersaurus was fairly small, with a body length of only 9–14.1 m (30–46 ft) and a femur reaching only 1 m (3 ft 3 in); it may have weighed around 1.9–4 t (2.1–4.4 short tons), comparable to a modern elephant. It had a short neck for a sauropod, with thirteen cervical vertebrae. Nearly all rebbachisaurids had relatively short necks and a length of 10 m (33 ft) or less. The only members of the family that reached the size of larger sauropods were Rebbachisaurus and Maraapunisaurus.

=== Skull ===
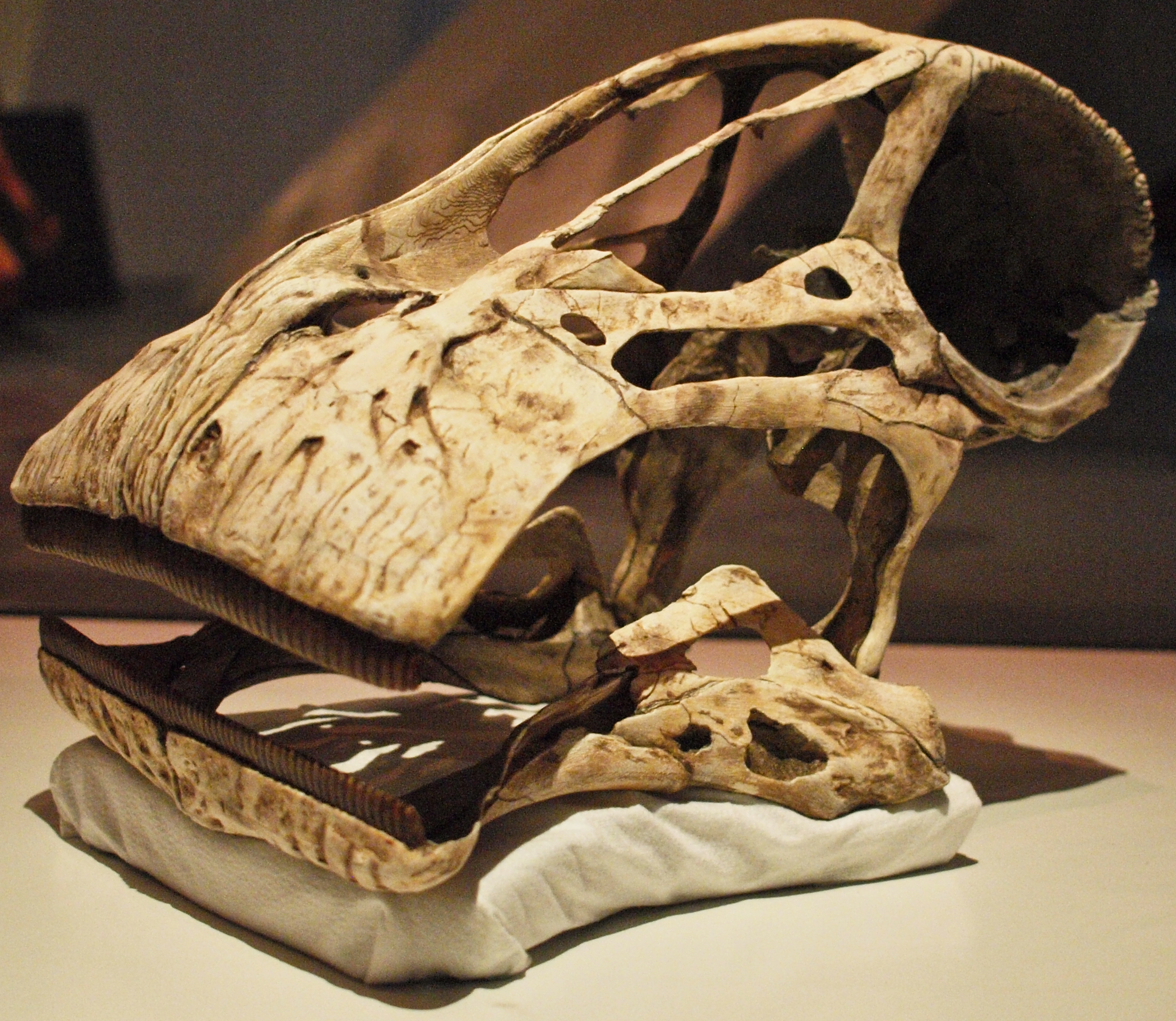
Skull cast, Royal Ontario Museum

The skull of Nigersaurus was delicate, with the four side fenestrae (openings in the skull) larger than in other sauropodomorphs. The total area of bone connecting the muzzle to the back of the skull was only 1.0 cm^{2} (0.16 sq in). These connecting struts of bones were usually less than 2 mm (0.08 in) thick. Despite this, the skull was resistant to the sustained shearing of the teeth. Another unique trait it had among sauropodomorphs was a closed supratemporal fenestra. The nasal openings, the bony nostrils, were elongated. Though the nasal bones are not completely known, it appears the front margin of the bony nostril was closer to the snout than in other diplodocoids. The snout was also proportionately shorter, and the tooth row was not at all prognathous, the snout tip not protruding relative to the remainder of the tooth series. Nigersaurus was distinct in that its frontal bone (which formed much of the skull-roof) was elongate (much narrower than long), and had a marked cerebral fossa (a depression on the surface of this bone inside the head). The maxillary tooth row was in its entirety transversely rotated, its normal rear 90° everted towards the front. This was matched by an identical rotation of the dentary of the lower jaw. This transverse orientation of the upper and lower tooth rows was unique to the dinosaur. Due to this configuration, no other tetrapod had all of its teeth located as far to the front as Nigersaurus.

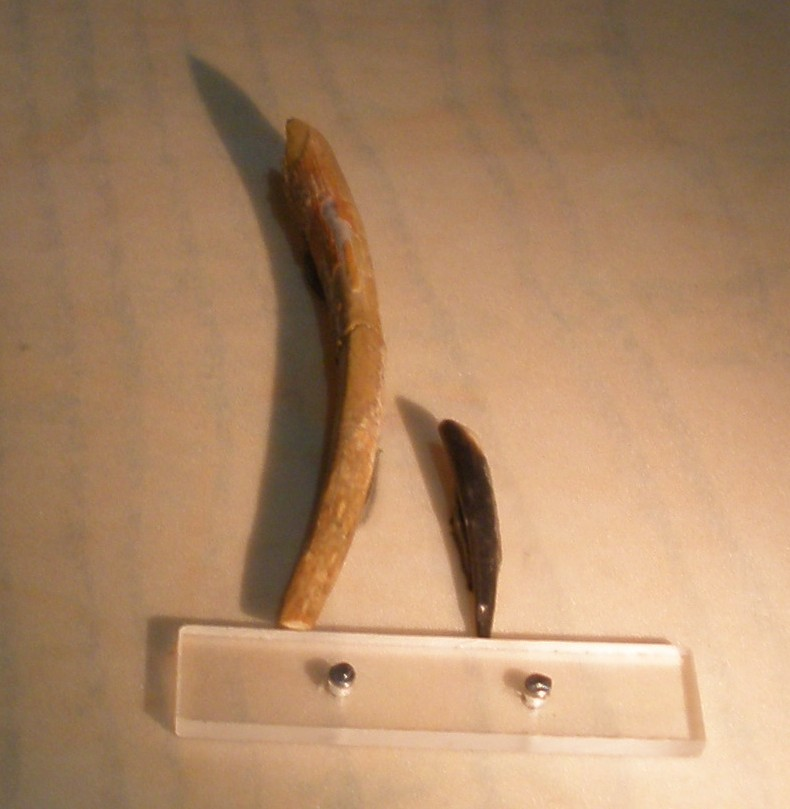
Teeth at different growth stages, Museo di Storia Naturale di Venezia

The slender teeth had slightly curved tooth crowns, which were oval in cross-section. The crowns were distinct in having prominent ridges on the margins of their midline and sides. The teeth in the lower jaw may have been 20–30% smaller than those in the upper jaw, but few are known, and they are of uncertain maturity. Apart from this, the teeth were identical. Under each active tooth there was a column of nine replacement teeth within the jaw. With 68 columns in the upper jaws and 60 columns in the lower jaws, these so-called dental batteries (also present in hadrosaurs and ceratopsians) comprised a total of more than 500 active and replacement teeth. Dental batteries erupted in unison, not each column individually. The enamel on the teeth of Nigersaurus was highly asymmetrical, ten times thicker on the outwards facing side than on the inner side. This condition is otherwise known only in advanced ornithischians.

Nigersaurus did not exhibit the same modifications seen in the jaws of other dinosaurs with dental batteries, or mammals with elaborate chewing functions. The lower jaw was L-shaped and divided into the subcylindrical transverse ramus, which contained the teeth, and the back ramus, which was more lightweight and was the location for most of the muscle attachments. It was distinct in that the tooth row expanded to the sides from the plane of the main ramus of the lower jaw. The jaws also contained several fenestrae, including five that are not present in other sauropods. The front ends of the jaws had grooves that indicate the presence of a keratinous (horny) sheath. Nigersaurus is the only known tetrapod animal to have had jaws wider than the skull and teeth that extended laterally across the front. The snout was even broader than those of the "duck-billed" hadrosaurs.

=== Postcranial skeleton ===
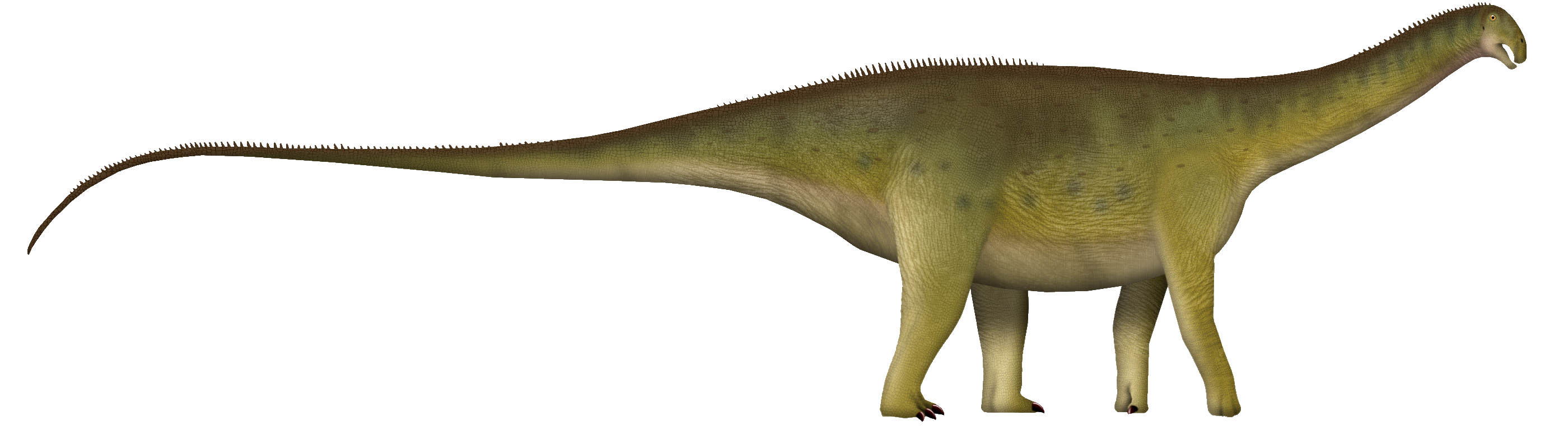
Hypothetical life restoration

Nigersaurus was distinct in that its dorsal (back) vertebrae had paired pneumatic spaces at the base of the neural spines (the spines that projected upwards from the vertebrae). The presacral vertebrae (vertebrae in front of the sacrum) were heavily pneumatised to the point where the column consisted of a series of hollow "shells", each divided by a thin septum in the middle. It had little to no cancellous bone, making the centra thin bone plates filled with air spaces. The vertebral arches were so heavily pierced by extensions of the external air sacs that of their side walls little remained but 2 mm (0.08 in) thick intersecting laminae, the ridges between the pneumatic openings. The vertebrae of the tail, however, did have solid centra.

The pelvic and pectoral girdle bones were very thin also, often only several millimetres thick. It had a prominent rugosity (a roughly wrinkled area) on the midline aspect of the scapular blade's base, a distinguishing feature. Like other sauropods, its limbs were robust, contrasting with the extremely lightweight construction of the rest of the skeleton. The limbs were not as specialised as the rest of the skeleton, and the front legs of Nigersaurus were about two-thirds the length of the back legs, as in most diplodocoids.

== Classification ==
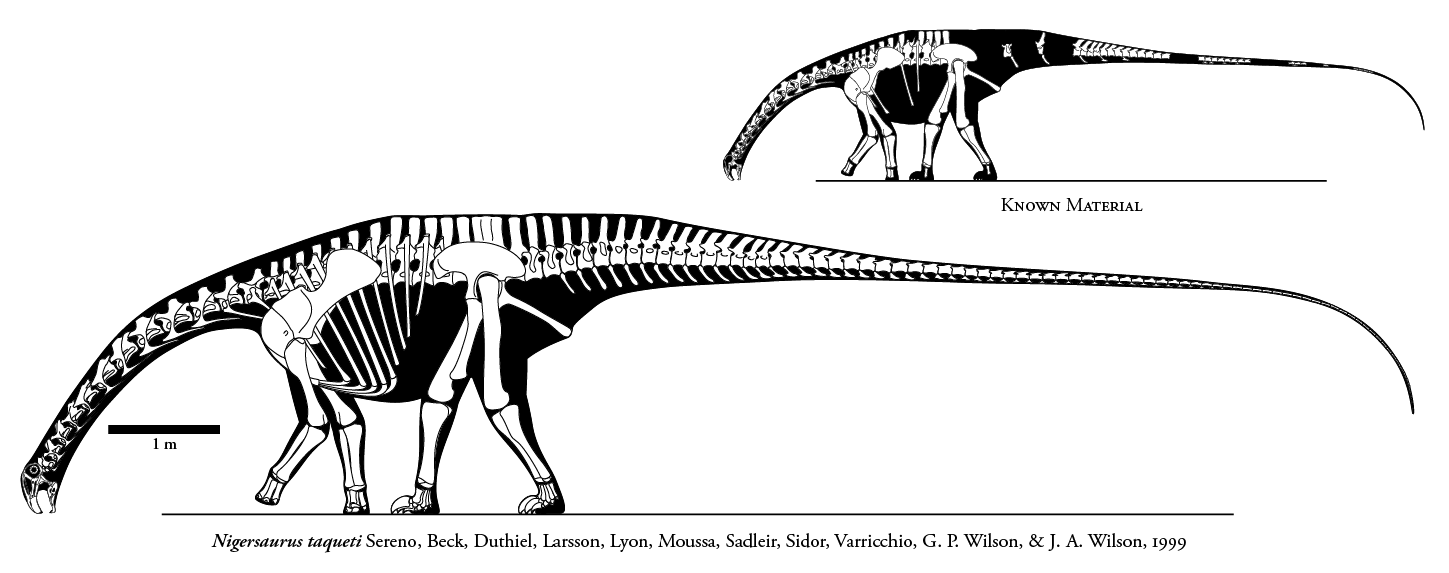
Skeletal diagram with missing bones reconstructed

The remains of Nigersaurus were initially described by Taquet in 1976 as belonging to a dicraeosaurid, but in 1999 Sereno and colleagues reclassified it as a rebbachisaurid diplodocoid. These researchers speculated that since short necks and small size was known among basal diplodocoids, it may indicate these were ancestral features of the group. Rebbachisauridae is the basalmost family within the superfamily Diplodocoidea, which also contains the long-necked diplodocids and the short-necked dicraeosaurids. The eponymous subfamily Nigersaurinae, which includes Nigersaurus and closely related genera, was named by the American palaeontologist John A. Whitlock in 2011.

The closely related genus Demandasaurus from Spain was described by the Spanish palaeontologist Fidel Torcida Fernández-Baldor and colleagues in 2011, and along with other animal groups that span the Cretaceous of Africa and Europe, this indicates that carbonate platforms connected these landmasses across the Tethys Sea. This was supported in 2013 by the Italian palaeontologist Federico Fanti and colleagues in their description of the nigersaurine Tataouinea from Tunisia, which was more related to the European form than to Nigersaurus, despite being from Africa, then part of the supercontinent Gondwana. Pneumatisation of the rebbachisaurid skeleton evolved progressively, culminating in the nigersaurines.

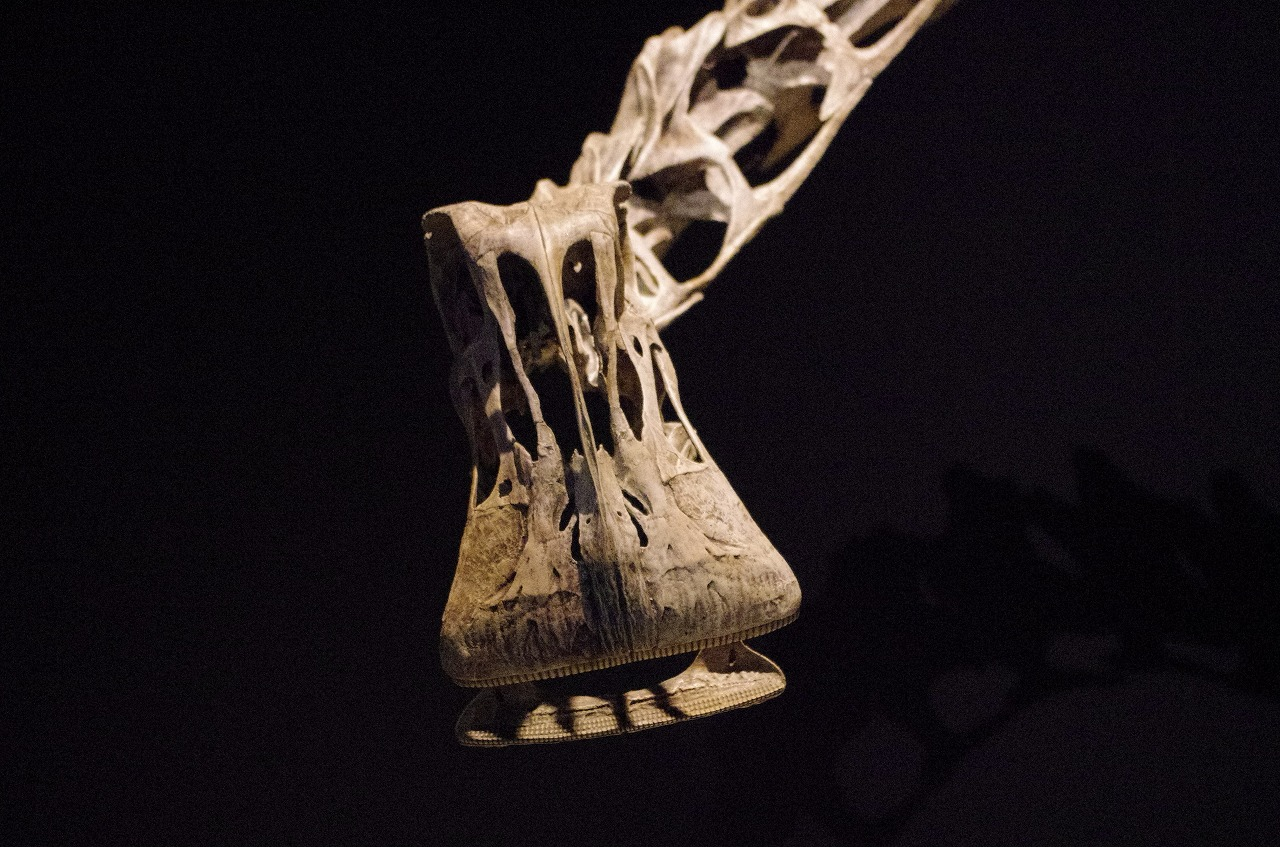
Front view of reconstructed skull

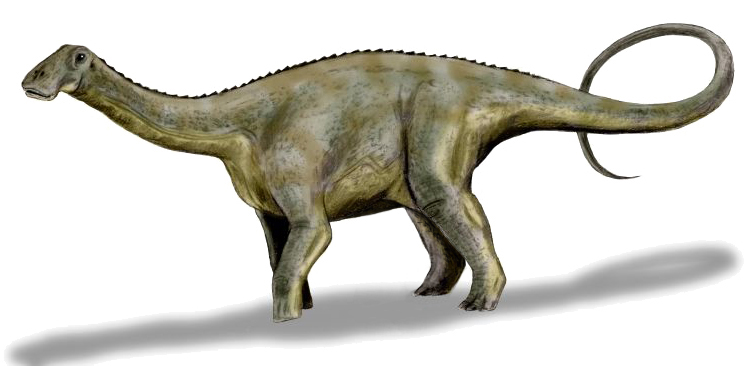
Life restoration

Below is a cladogram following the 2013 analysis by Fanti and colleagues, which confirmed the placement of Nigersaurus as a basal nigersaurine rebbachisaurid.

- Rebbachisauridae
  - Amazonsaurus
  - - Histriasaurus
    - Zapalasaurus
    - - Comahuesaurus
      - - Limaysaurinae
          - Rayososaurus
          - Rebbachisaurus
          - - Cathartesaura
            - Limaysaurus
        - Nigersaurinae
          - Nigersaurus
          - - Demandasaurus
            - Tataouinea

A 2015 cladistic study by Wilsona and the French palaeontologist Ronan Allain found Rebbachisaurus itself to group with the nigersaurines, and the authors suggested that Nigersaurinae was therefore a junior synonym of Rebbachisaurinae (since that name would have priority). The same year, Fanti and colleagues supported the use of Rebbachisaurinae over Nigersaurinae, and found Nigersaurus to be the basalmost member of this "Euro-African" subclade.

In 2019, Mannion and colleagues pointed out that since Nigersaurus was found to be the sister taxon of all other nigersaurines in some studies, a Rebbachisaurinae clade may not necessarily include Nigersaurus itself (as well as the fact that the position of Rebbachisaurus could change in future analyses), and supported the continued use of the name Nigersaurinae over Rebbachisaurinae for all rebbachisaurids more closely related to Nigersaurus than to Limaysaurus. They found that nigersaurines were restricted to North Africa and Europe, and that Limaysaurinae was strictly known from Argentina. The same year, the Brazilian palaeontologist Rafael Matos Lindoso and colleagues used the name Nigersaurinae following Mannion's recommendation, and found Itapeuasaurus from Brazil to group with the nigersaurines, thereby expanding this lineage more widely (making palaeobiogeographic hypotheses for this group less reliable).

== Palaeobiology ==
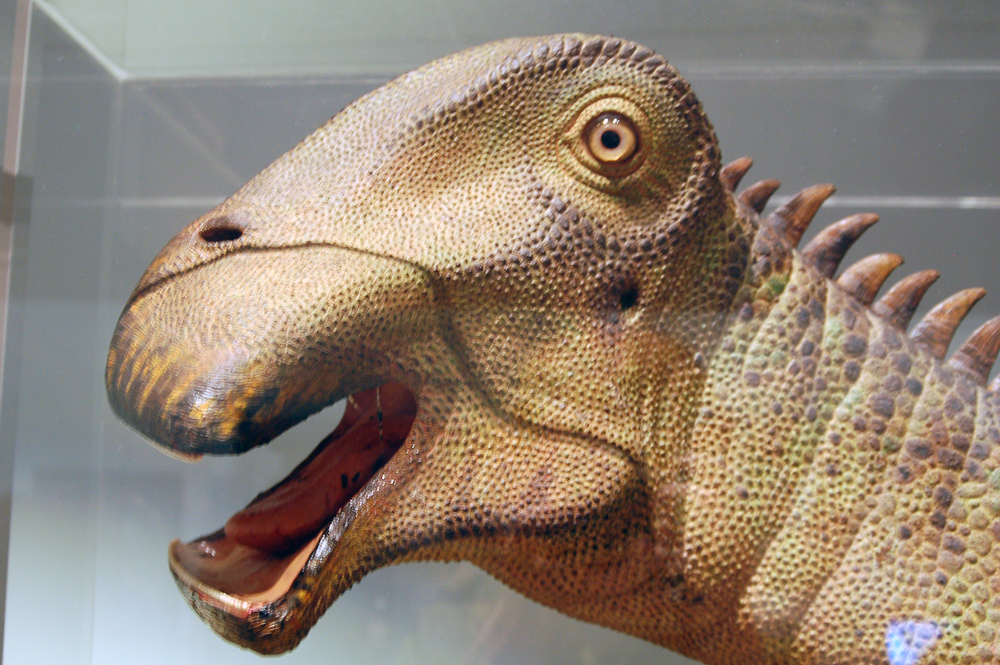
Model head at the Australian Museum, Sydney

Though it had large nostrils and a fleshy snout, Sereno and colleagues found that Nigersaurus had an underdeveloped olfactory region of its brain and thus did not have an advanced sense of smell. Its brain-to-body-mass ratio was average for a reptile, and smaller than those of ornithischians and non-coelurosaurian theropods. The cerebrum comprised about 30% of the brain volume, as in many other dinosaurs. The American palaeoartist Mark Hallett and paleontologist Mathew J. Wedel stated in 2016 that while sauropods in general could use their long necks to detect predators from afar, this would not apply to the short-necked Nigersaurus. They pointed out that the eyes of Nigersaurus were placed further towards the top of the skull than in most other sauropods, above the muzzle, which would give it overlapping fields of view. Its visual field would have been at or close to 360 degrees, and hypersensitivity of movement would have been important to a vulnerable prey-animal.

In 2017, the Argentinian palaeontologist Lucio M. Ibiricu and colleagues examined the postcranial skeletal pneumaticity in the skeletons of rebbachisaurids, and suggested that it was an adaptation for lowering the density of the skeleton, and that this could have decreased the muscle energy needed to move the body, as well as the heat generated in the process. Since several rebbachisaurids inhabited latitudes that would have been tropical to subtropical in the Middle Cretaceous, this pneumaticity may have helped the animals cope with the very high temperatures. According to Ibiricu and colleagues, this adaptation may be a reason why rebbachisaurids were the only group of diplodocoids that survived into the Late Cretaceous.

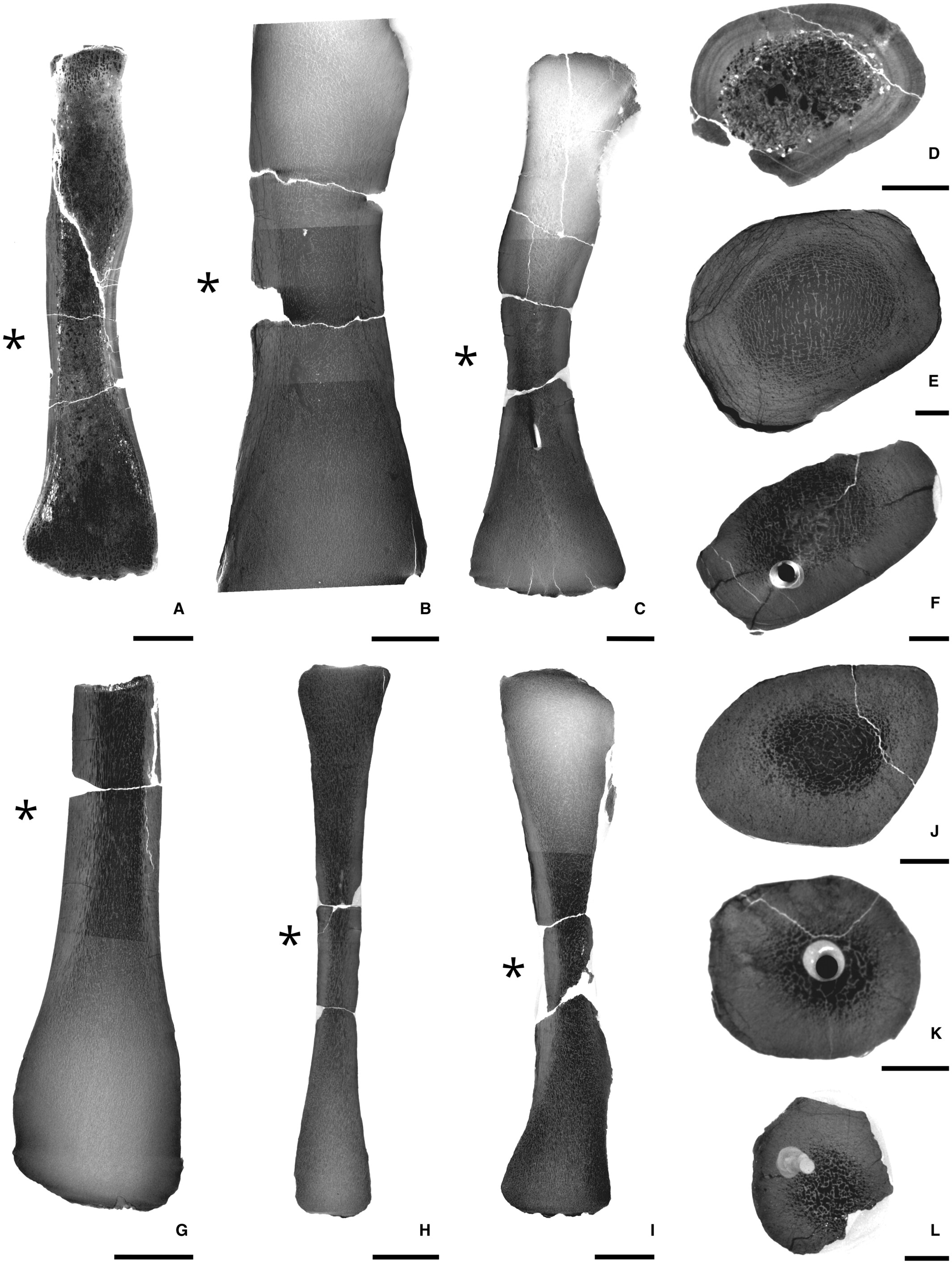
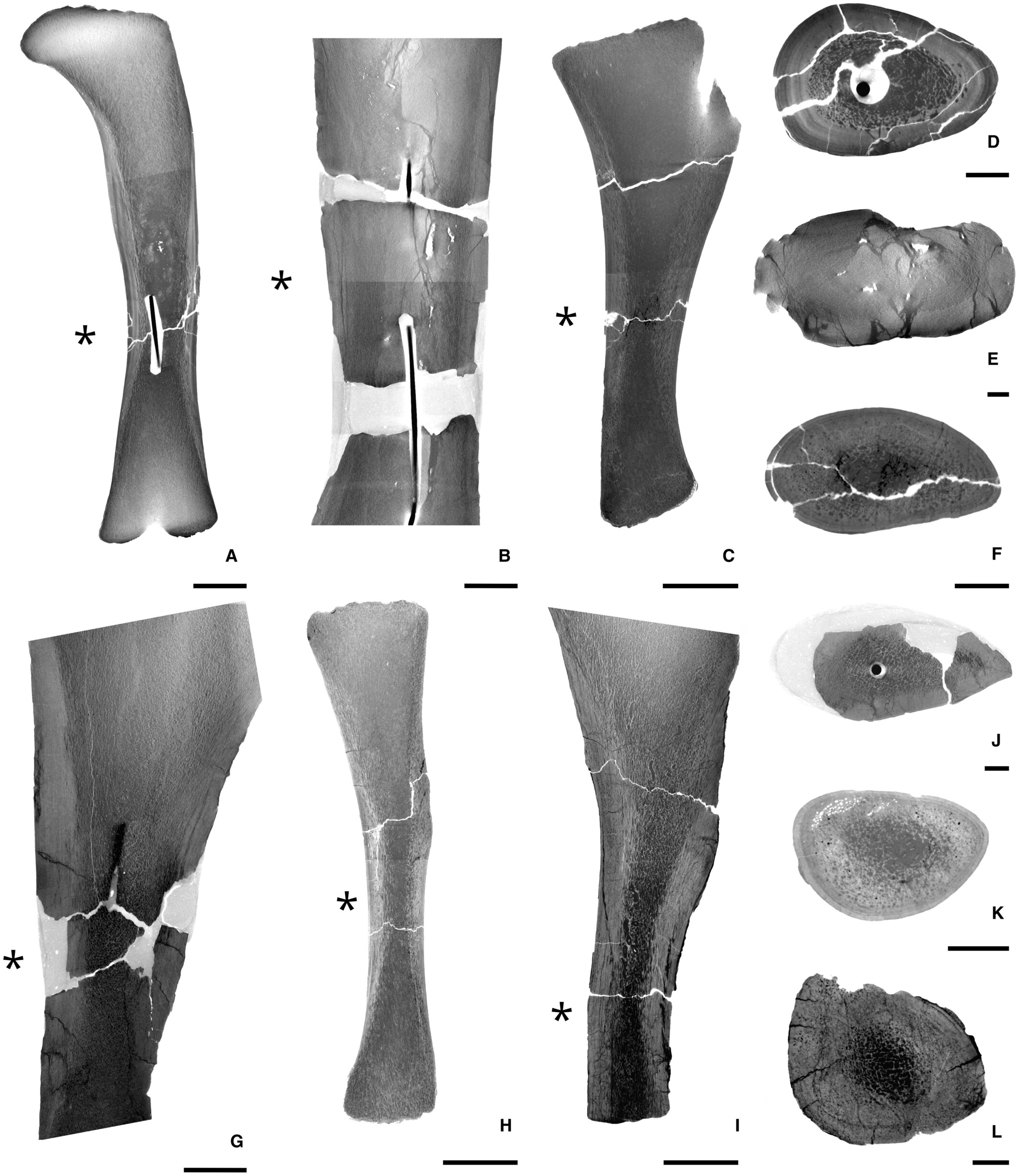
Virtual sections of CT-scanned Nigersaurus limb elements

A 2023 study by the French palaeontologist Rémi Lefebvre and colleagues examined the microanatomical structure of the limb bones of Nigersaurus through CT-scans, the first such study of a sauropod. Virtual sections of the limb bones sampled from individuals of different sizes were explored to determine the range of variation. Heavy-weight bearing animals often have features associated with this condition, affecting the inner structure of the limb bones, but the variation between such bones is poorly known. While other heavy animals examined (such as rhinoceroses) had thick and variable bone cortices, the cortex of Nigersaurus was rather thin. These researchers suggested that the microanatomy of sauropods was not affected by drastic selective pressure caused by bearing weight, but that features such as the columnar limbs (as seen in elephants), pneumaticity, and fleshy foot pads and cartilage relaxed pressure on the bones. They also suggested that sauropods may therefore have been lighter in weight than expected for their size, supporting the lowest body mass estimates for these dinosaurs.

=== Diet and feeding ===
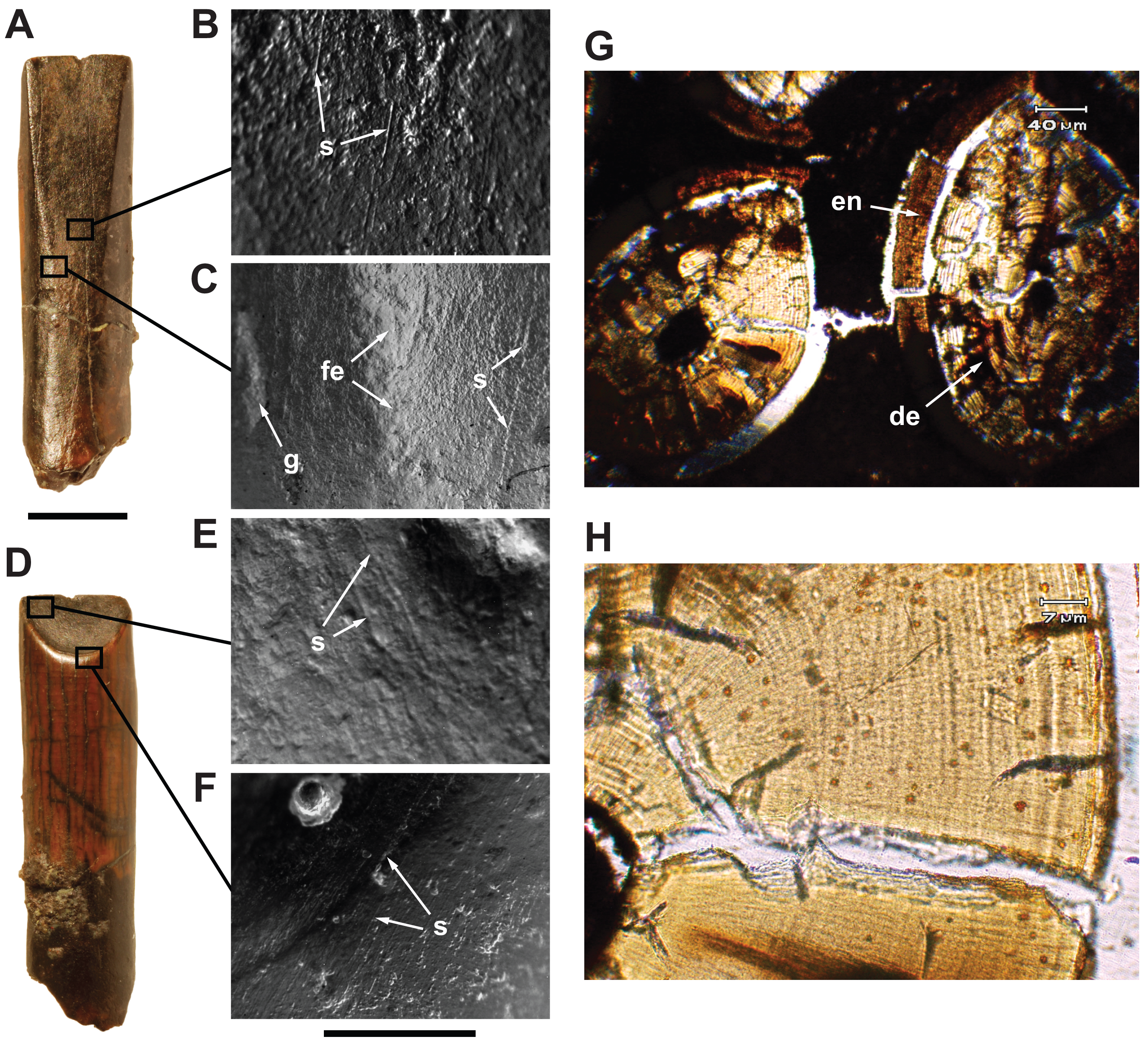
Crown form, wear pattern, and microstructure of the teeth

Nigersaurus was suggested by Sereno and colleagues to be a ground-level, non-selective browser. The width of the muzzle and lateral orientation of the tooth row show that the sauropod could gather much food and crop it close to the ground, within 1 m (3 ft 3 in) of the surface. This is further supported by facets on the labial (externally facing) side of the upper teeth, similar to Dicraeosaurus and Diplodocus, which are evidence that food or substrate wore the animal's teeth as it fed. Nigersaurus also bears signs of low-angle tooth-to-tooth wear on the inside of the maxillary crowns, which suggests that jaw movement was limited to precise up-and-down motions. Worn teeth from the lower jaw have not yet been discovered, but they are expected to show opposing tooth-to-tooth wear. The ability to raise their heads well above the ground does not necessarily mean they browsed on items there, and the short neck of Nigersaurus would have restricted the browsing range compared to other diplodocoids.

The adductor muscle of the jaw appears to have attached to the quadrate instead of the supratemporal fenestra. Both this and the other mastication muscles were likely weak, and Nigersaurus is estimated to have had one of the weakest bites of the sauropods. In addition, according to Whitlock and colleagues in 2011, the small, nearly parallel nature of the tooth scratches and pits (caused by grit, which would not be obtained as often by high-browsers) indicate that it ate relatively soft, herbaceous plants such as low-growing ferns. Because of the lateral orientation of the teeth, it probably would not have been able to chew. Nigersaurus wore its tooth crowns down faster than other dinosaurian herbivores, and its tooth replacement rate was the highest of any known dinosaur. Each tooth was replaced once every 14 days; the rate had previously been estimated lower. In contrast to Nigersaurus, sauropods with lower tooth replacement rates and broader tooth crowns are thought to have been canopy browsers.

Grass did not evolve until the late Cretaceous, making ferns, horsetails, and angiosperms (which had evolved by the middle Cretaceous) potential food for Nigersaurus. Sereno and colleagues stated it was unlikely that Nigersaurus fed on conifers, cycads, or aquatic vegetation, due respectively to their height, hard and stiff structure, and lack of appropriate habitat. Wedel suggested that the evenly spaced teeth of Nigersaurus could have functioned like a comb, by straining water plants or invertebrates, similar to flamingos. He also suggested it could have low-browsed from short conifers and other low-growing plants.

=== Head posture ===
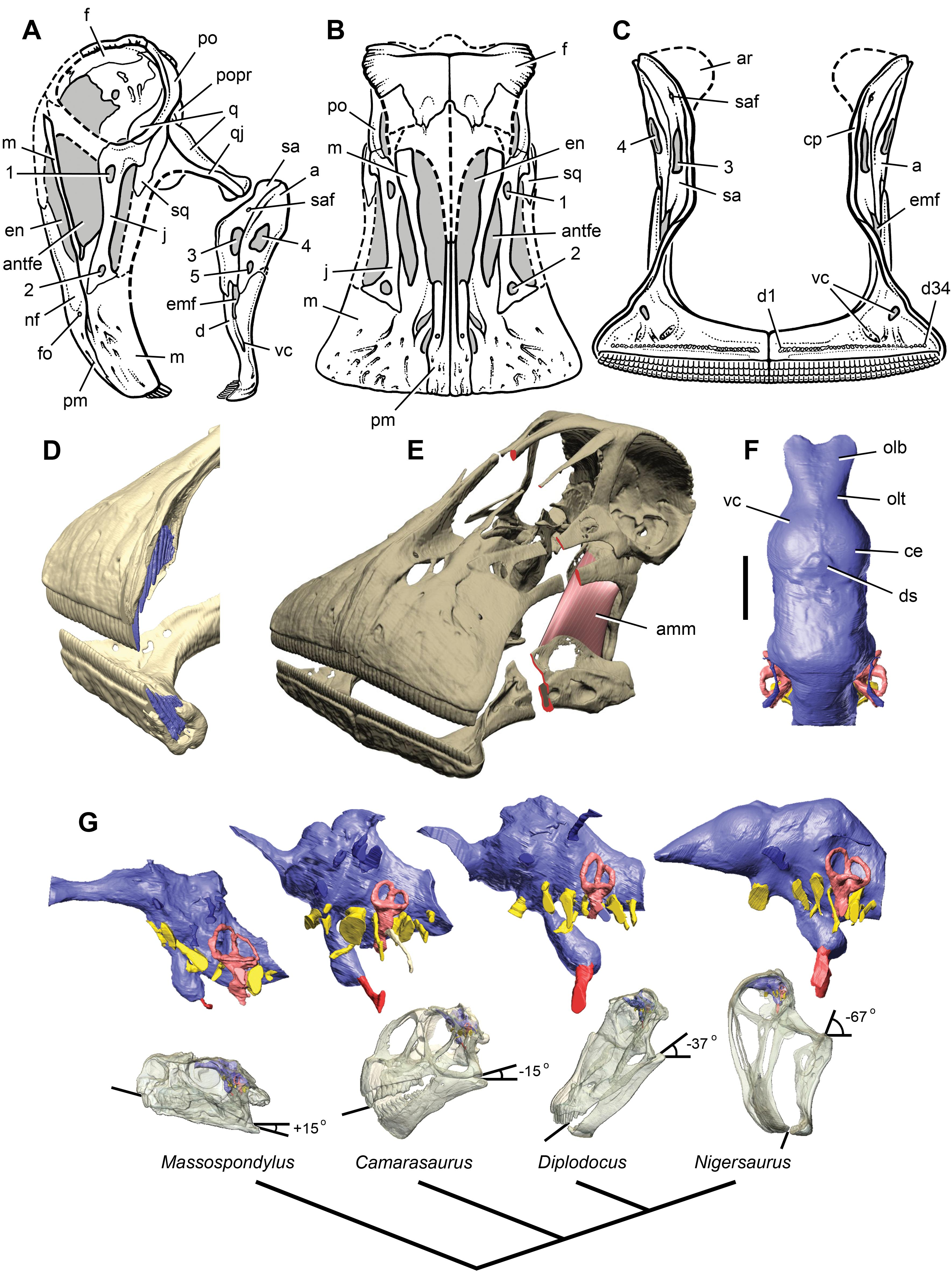
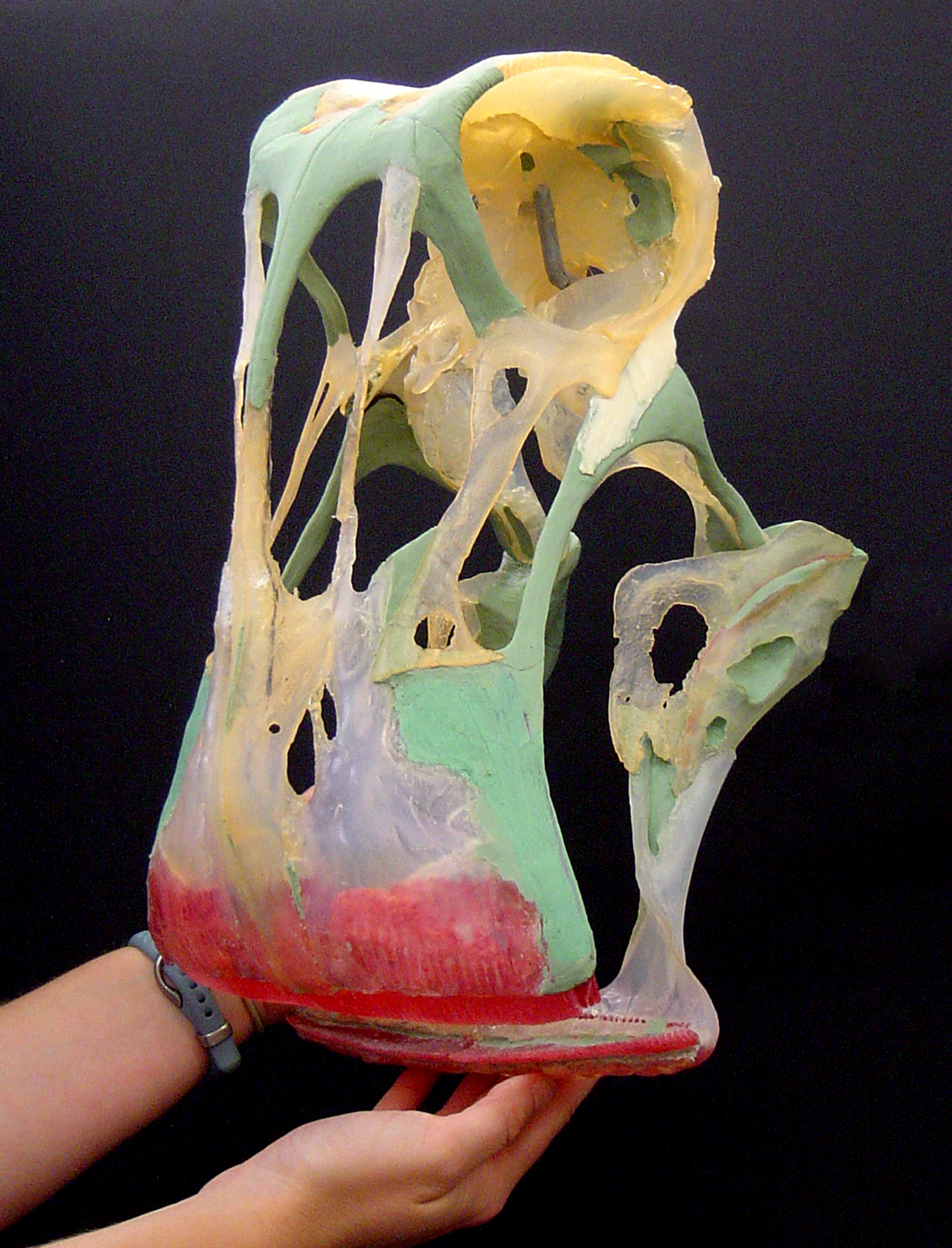
Diagrams of the skull and jaw, and 3D reconstructions of the dental battery, skull, and brain, as well as sauropodomorph head postures proposed by Sereno and colleagues (left), and "prototype" skull based on scans (right, dental batteries in red, green bones are reconstructed)

On the basis of microtomography scans of skull elements of the holotype specimen, Sereno and colleagues created a "prototype" Nigersaurus skull they could examine. They also made an endocast of the brain and scanned the semicircular canals of its inner ear, which they found to be oriented horizontally. In their 2007 study, they stated that the structure of the occiput at the back of the skull and cervical vertebrae would have limited the upward and downward movement of the neck and the rotation of the skull. Based on this biomechanical analysis, the team concluded that the head and muzzle were habitually oriented 67° downwards and close to ground level, as an adaptation for ground-level browsing. This is unlike the way other sauropods have been restored, with their heads held more horizontally.

A 2009 study by the British palaeontologist Mike P. Taylor and colleagues agreed that Nigersaurus was able to feed with the downturned head and neck posture proposed by the 2007 study, but contested that this was the habitual posture of the animal. The study noted that the "neutral" head and neck posture of modern animals does not necessarily correspond to their habitual head posture. It further argued that the orientation of the semicircular canals varies significantly within modern species, and is therefore not reliable for determining head posture. This was supported by the Spanish palaeontologist Jesús Marugán-Lobón and colleagues in a 2013 study that suggested the methods used by Sereno's team were imprecise, and that Nigersaurus habitually held its head like other sauropods.

In 2020, the French palaeontologist Julien Benoit and colleagues tested lateral semicircular canal correlation to head posture on modern mammals, and found that while there was significant correlation between the reconstructed and actual head postures, the plane of the semicircular canal was not held horizontally in the resting pose as inferred. The authors therefore cautioned against using semicircular canals as proxy to infer the precise orientation of skulls. They found that diet correlated strongly with semicircular canal orientation, but not with head posture, while head posture and semicircular canal orientation were strongly correlated with phylogeny.

== Palaeoenvironment ==
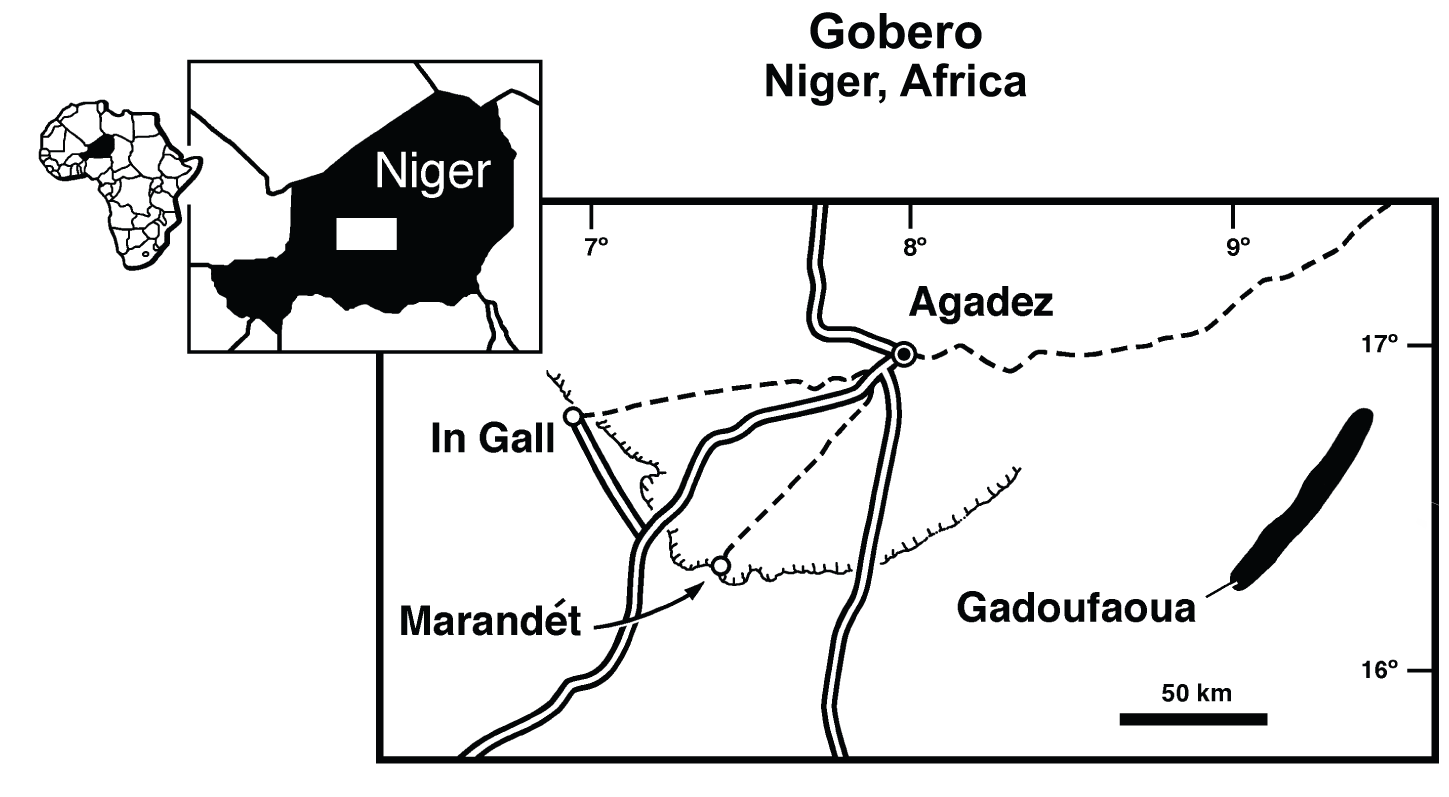
Location of Gadoufaoua in Niger

Nigersaurus is known from the Elrhaz Formation of the Tegama Group in an area of the Ténéré Desert called Gadoufaoua, located in Niger. It is one of the most commonly found vertebrates in the formation. The Elrhaz Formation consists mainly of fluvial sandstones with low relief, much of which is obscured by sand dunes. The sediments are coarse- to medium-grained, with almost no fine-grained horizons. Nigersaurus lived in what is now Niger about 120 to 112 million years ago, during the Aptian and Albian ages of the mid-Cretaceous. It likely lived in habitats dominated by inland floodplains (a riparian zone).

After the iguanodontian Lurdusaurus, Nigersaurus was the most numerous megaherbivore. Other herbivores from the same formation include Ouranosaurus, Elrhazosaurus, and an unnamed titanosaur. Together, these compose one of the few associations of megaherbivores with a balance of sauropods and large ornithopods. It also lived alongside the theropods Kryptops, Suchomimus, Eocarcharia, and Afromimus. Crocodylomorphs like Sarcosuchus, Anatosuchus, Araripesuchus, and Stolokrosuchus also lived there. In addition, remains of a pterosaur, chelonians, fish, a hybodont shark, and freshwater bivalves have been found. The aquatic fauna consists entirely of freshwater inhabitants.
