= List of Indian and Madagascan dinosaurs =

Dinosaurs of the Indian-Madagascan landmasses prehistorically

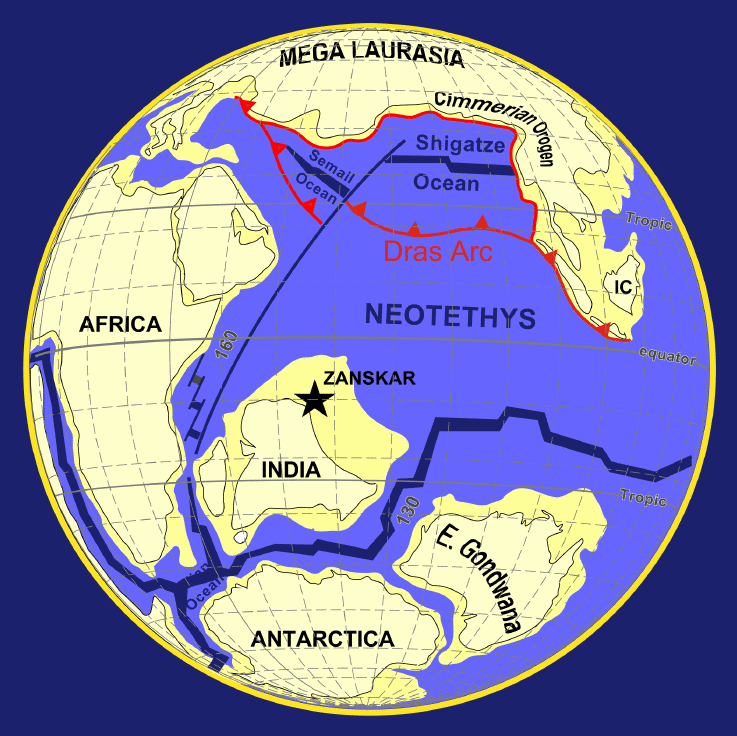
Globe showing union of India and Madacascar, approx 100 Mya

This is a list of non-avian dinosaurs whose remains have been recovered from the Indian subcontinent or Madagascar. Though widely separated today, the Indian subcontinent and Madagascar were connected throughout much of the Mesozoic and shared similar dinosaur faunas, distinct from what has been found on other modern African and Asian landmasses.

The Indian fossil record of dinosaurs is good, with fossils coming from the entire Mesozoic era – starting with the Triassic period (a geological period that started 251.9 million years ago and continued till 201.3 million years ago), to the Jurassic period (201 million years ago to 143 million years ago) and Cretaceous period (from 143 million years ago to 66 million years ago), when globally all non-avian dinosaurs and 75 per cent of all life on Earth together became extinct. Madagascar also preserves various unique dinosaurs from the Triassic, the Jurassic and the Cretaceous.

== Criteria for inclusion ==
- The genus must appear on the List of dinosaur genera.
- At least one named species of the creature must have been found in the Indian subcontinent or Madagascar.

== List of Indian and Madagascan dinosaurs ==
=== Valid genera ===
Name	Year	Formation	Location	Notes	Images
Archaeodontosaurus	2005	Isalo III Formation (Middle Jurassic, Bajocian to Bathonian)	Madagascar	Retained "prosauropod"-like teeth despite its late age	
Barapasaurus	1975	Kota Formation (Early Jurassic, Sinemurian to Pliensbachian)	India	Several individuals have been found associated with tree trunks, which may represent the aftermath of a flood	
Brachypodosaurus	1934	Lameta Formation (Late Cretaceous, Maastrichtian)	India	Has been suggested to be a thyreophoran, but such an identification is unlikely	
Bruhathkayosaurus	1987	Kallamedu Formation (Late Cretaceous, Maastrichtian)	India	Reportedly exceptionally large but its fossils have been lost. Its bones have been informally speculated to be misidentified tree trunks but later research suggests at least the tibia is real	
Ceratocaudia	2026	Kaladongar Formation (Early Jurassic to Middle Jurassic, Pliensbachian to Bajocian)	India	One of the oldest macronarians. May represent a dwarf taxon	
Coeluroides	1933	Lameta Formation (Late Cretaceous, Maastrichtian)	India	Potentially synonymous with Ornithomimoides	
Compsosuchus	1933	Lameta Formation (Late Cretaceous, Maastrichtian)	India	Has been suggested to be both an abelisaurid and a noasaurid	
Dahalokely	2013	Ambolafotsy Formation (Late Cretaceous, Turonian)	Madagascar	Shares features of both abelisaurids and noasaurids	
Dandakosaurus	1982	Kota Formation (Early Jurassic, Pliensbachian to Toarcian)	India	Poorly known but large for an early theropod	
Dryptosauroides	1932	Lameta Formation (Late Cretaceous, Maastrichtian)	India	Only known from six caudal vertebrae	
Indosaurus	1933	Lameta Formation (Late Cretaceous, Maastrichtian)	India	Had a characteristically thickened skull	
Indosuchus	1933	Lameta Formation (Late Cretaceous, Maastrichtian)	India	Its skull was flattened and topped by a short crest	
Isisaurus	2003	Lameta Formation (Late Cretaceous, Maastrichtian)	India	Unusually proportioned with a short, robust neck and long limbs	
Jainosaurus	1995	Lameta Formation (Late Cretaceous, Maastrichtian)	India	Originally named as a species of Antarctosaurus	
Jaklapallisaurus	2011	Upper Maleri Formation (Late Triassic, Norian to Rhaetian)	India	May have been closely related to South American sauropodomorphs	
Kotasaurus	1988	Kota Formation (Early Jurassic, Sinemurian to Pliensbachian)	India	The neural spines of its vertebrae were massively constructed, which is a basal trait	
Laevisuchus	1933	Lameta Formation (Late Cretaceous, Maastrichtian)	India	Only known from three vertebrae but can confidently be assigned to the Noasauridae	
Lametasaurus	1923	Lameta Formation (Late Cretaceous, Maastrichtian)	India	Described based on now lost remains, it is currently seen as a possible chimera including theropod material and osteoderms of uncertain origin	
Lamplughsaura	2007	Upper Dharmaram Formation (Early Jurassic, Sinemurian)	India	Large and robustly built	
Lapparentosaurus	1986	Isalo III Formation (Middle Jurassic, Bathonian)	Madagascar	Relatively fast-growing as evidenced by the preservation of a large amount of fibrolamellar bone	
Majungasaurus	1955	Maevarano Formation (Late Cretaceous, Maastrichtian)	Madagascar	Bite marks on several specimens have been found to perfectly match the teeth of this genus, suggesting cannibalistic tendencies	
Maleriraptor	2025	Upper Maleri Formation (Late Triassic, Norian)	India	This genus fills a temporal gap between older South American herrerasaurs and younger North American taxa	
Masiakasaurus	2001	Maevarano Formation (Late Cretaceous, Maastrichtian)	Madagascar	Possessed procumbent teeth at the tips of its jaws which may indicate a feeding specialization	
Nambalia	2011	Upper Maleri Formation (Late Triassic, Norian to Rhaetian)	India	Known from the remains of two individuals	
Narindasaurus	2020	Isalo III Formation (Middle Jurassic, Bathonian to Callovian)	Madagascar	The oldest known turiasaur	
Ornithomimoides	1932	Lameta Formation (Late Cretaceous, Maastrichtian)	India	Two species have been named, both from isolated vertebrae	
Orthogoniosaurus	1931	Lameta Formation (Late Cretaceous, Maastrichtian)	India	Only known from a single, fragmentary tooth	
Pradhania	2007	Upper Dharmaram Formation (Early Jurassic, Sinemurian)	India	Closely related to Massospondylus	
Rahiolisaurus	2010	Lameta Formation (Late Cretaceous, Maastrichtian)	India	Remains of multiple growth stages are known	
Rajasaurus	2003	Lameta Formation (Late Cretaceous, Maastrichtian)	India	Possessed a single, short horn on its forehead that may have been used for display and head-butting	
Rapetosaurus	2001	Maevarano Formation (Late Cretaceous, Maastrichtian)	Madagascar	Known from almost the entire skeleton, including the skull	
Tharosaurus	2023	Jaisalmer Formation (Middle Jurassic, Bathonian)	India	Described as an early diplodocoid, but it was later reinterpreted as an indeterminate eusauropod	
Titanosaurus	1877	Kallakurichi Formation, Lameta Formation (Late Cretaceous, Maastrichtian)	India	Although only known from a few bones, this genus is the namesake of the Titanosauria and the Titanosauriformes	
Vahiny	2014	Maevarano Formation (Late Cretaceous, Maastrichtian)	Madagascar	May have been a rare component of its habitat due to the paucity of its remains	

=== Invalid and potentially valid genera ===
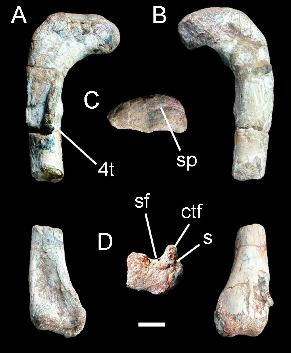
Alwalkeria

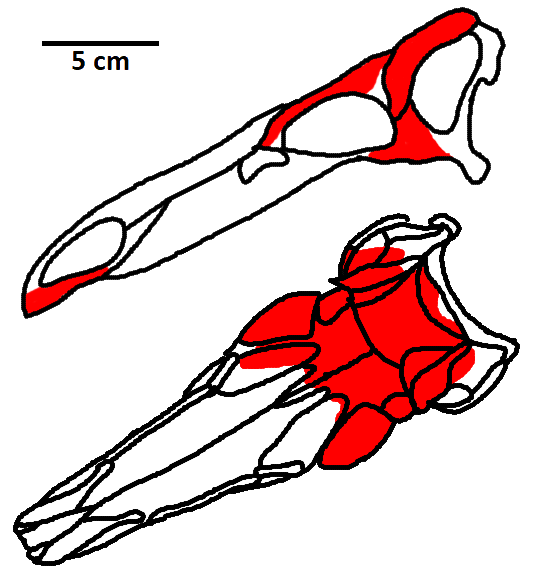
Dravidosaurus

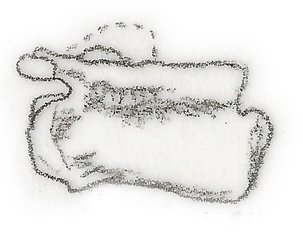
Jubbulpuria

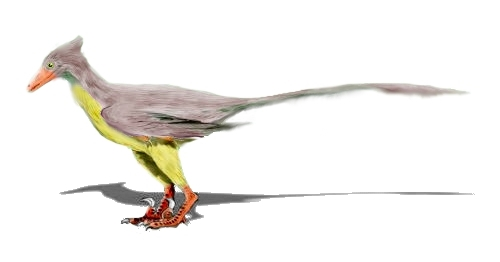
Rahonavis
- Alwalkeria maleriensis: Described based on a chimeric specimen. The exact holotypic bone cannot be identified any further than Avemetatarsalia.
- Dravidosaurus blanfordi: Described as a stegosaur but has been suggested to be a plesiosaur. However, it has been reported that stegosaur remains from its time and place are being described.
- Jubbulpuria tenuis: Potentially synonymous with Laevisuchus.
- Rahonavis ostromi: A small feathered maniraptoran. It has been variously suggested to be a dromaeosaurid (possibly an unenlagiine), an avialan or outside both groups.

== Timeline ==
This is a timeline of selected dinosaurs from the list above. Time is measured in a megaannum, which is a year when multiplied by a million times (i.e. a million years), along the x-axis.

== See also ==
- List of birds of India
- List of birds of Madagascar
