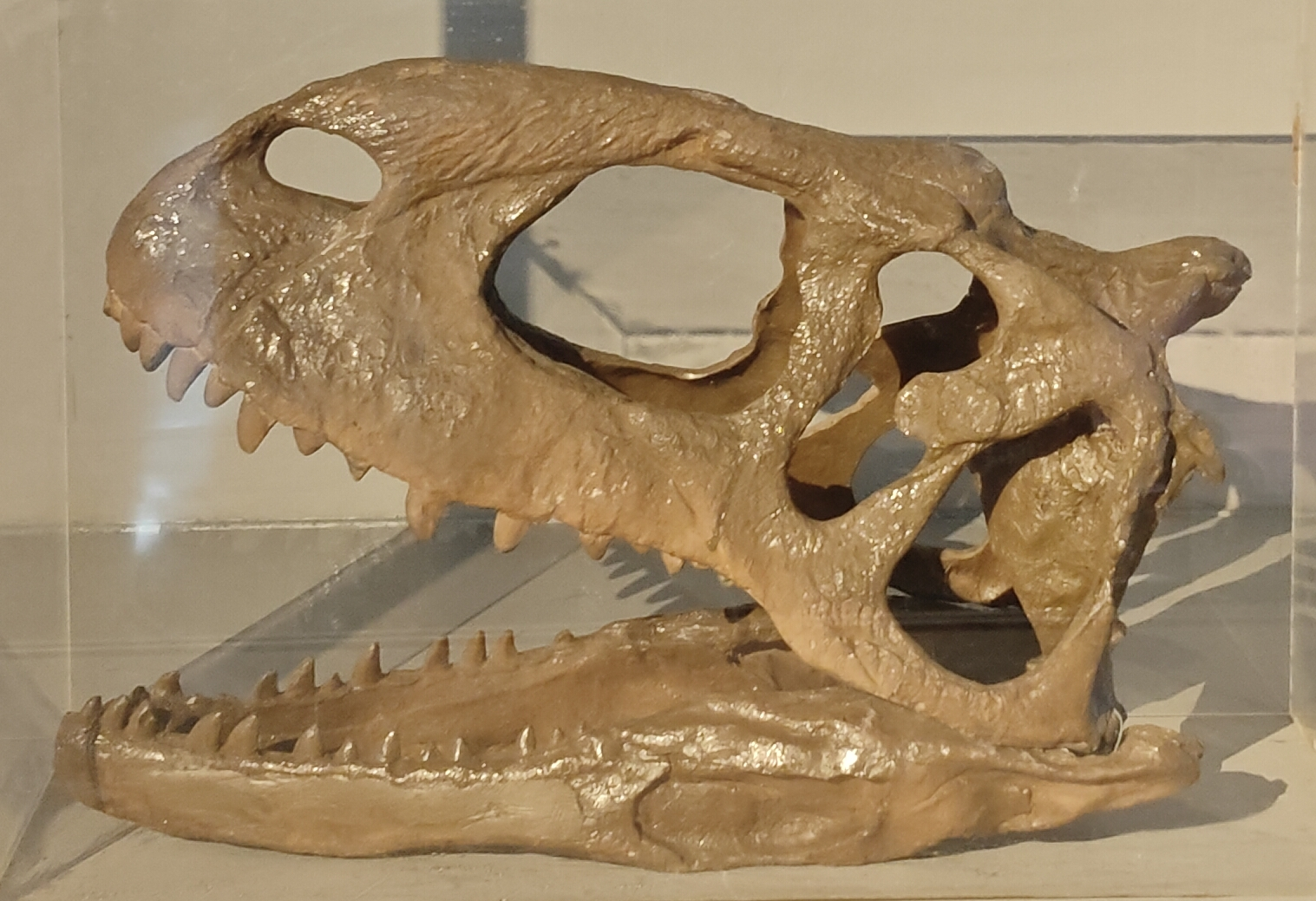
- Reconstructed skull

Scientific classification
- Kingdom: Animalia
- Phylum: Chordata
- Class: Reptilia
- Clade: Dinosauria
- Clade: Saurischia
- Clade: Theropoda
- Family: †Abelisauridae
- Subfamily: †Majungasaurinae
- Genus: †Rajasaurus; Wilson et al., 2003
- Species: †R. narmadensis

Binomial name
- †Rajasaurus narmadensis Wilson et al., 2003

= Rajasaurus =

Rajasaurus Temporal range: Late Cretaceous (Maastrichtian), 69–66 Ma

Abelisaurid dinosaur genus from Late Cretaceous India

Rajasaurus (/rɑːdʒə/lit. 'King lizard') is a genus of carnivorous abelisaurid theropod dinosaur from the Late Cretaceous of India, containing one species: Rajasaurus narmadensis. The bones were excavated from the Lameta Formation in the Gujarat state of Western India, probably inhabiting what is now the Narmada River Valley. It was formally described by palaeontologist Jeffrey A. Wilson and colleagues in 2003 based on a partial skeleton comprising the braincase, spine, hip bone, legs, and tail–a first for an Indian theropod. The dinosaur likely measured 6.6 metres (22 ft), and had a single horn on the forehead which was probably used for display and head-butting. Like other abelisaurids, Rajasaurus was probably an ambush predator.

India at this time was an island, due to the break-up of the supercontinent Gondwana, though it is possible animals still were able to migrate to and from nearby continents. The creation of the subfamily Majungasaurinae, and its inclusion of abelisaurids from India, Madagascar, and Europe–including Rajasaurus–further reiterates this. The Lameta Formation has yielded several other dinosaur species, including abelisaurids and titanosaurian sauropods, similar to other Gondwanan landmasses. The area during the Cretaceous was probably forested, and served as nesting grounds for several creatures.

== Discovery and naming ==
Rajasaurus type locality in Temple Hill, Rahioli, Gujarat, India

The Lameta Formation was first discovered in 1981 by geologists working for the Geological Survey of India (GSI), G. N. Dwivedi and Dhananjay Mahendrakumar Mohabey, after being given limestone structures–later recognised as dinosaur eggs–by workers of the ACC Cement Quarry in the village of Rahioli near the city Balasinor in the Gujarat state of western India. The remains of Rajasaurus were found in this fossil-rich limestone bed to which GSI geologist Suresh Srivastava was assigned to excavate on two separate trips from 1982–1983 and 1983–1984. In 2001, teams from the American Institute of Indian Studies and the National Geographic Society, with the support of the Panjab University, joined the study in order to reconstruct the excavated remains. Fragments of Rajasaurus were also found near Jabalpur in Madhya Pradesh in the northern part of the Lameta Formation, namely a piece of the upper jaw. Rajasaurus was then formally described in 2003 by geologist Jeffrey A. Wilson and colleagues.

The holotype specimen of Rajasaurus comprises a partial skeleton, GSI Type No. 21141/1-33, which includes the maxillae, premaxillae, braincase, and quadrate bone on the skull; and spine, hip bone, legs, and tail in post-cranial remains. It is the first Indian theropod to have preserved these post-cranial remains. It is possible Rajasaurus, Lametasaurus, and Indosaurus are synonymous, though this cannot be confirmed due to fragmentary remains, and the Lametasaurus specimen has been lost.

The generic name Rajasaurus derives from the Sanskrit rāja, meaning 'king, sovereign, chief, or best of its kind' and Ancient Greek sauros, meaning 'lizard'; and its specific name narmadensis refers to the Narmada River in central India near where it was discovered.

== Description ==
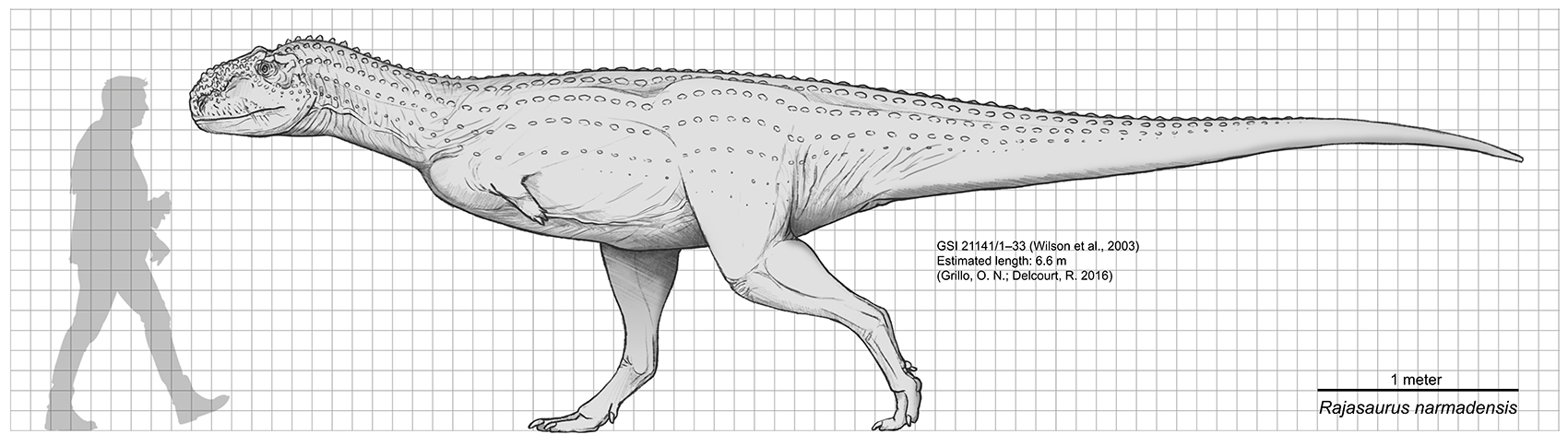
Scale diagram of Rajasaurus and a human

In 2010, palaeontologist Gregory S. Paul estimated the body length of Rajasaurus at 11 metres (36 ft) and weight at 4 metric tons (4.4 short tons). In 2016, its length was estimated to be 6.6 metres (22 ft), with the known vertebrae significantly smaller in size than those of Pycnonemosaurus, Carnotaurus and Ekrixinatosaurus. Rajasaurus closely resembled the Madagascan abelisaurid Majungasaurus. Rajasaurus typically had four fingers, short arms, and, to compensate, a heavily-constructed head which was the primary tool for hunting; however, the skull was short, they probably had modest jaw musculature, and the teeth were short. Rajasaurus probably had a bite force similar to Allosaurus at around 3,500 newtons (790 lbf). The pelvis and hindlimb bones of the contemporaneous Lametasaurus have been suggested to belong to Rajasaurus, based on shared features in the ilium. It also appears to be from a larger specimen than the holotype.

=== Skull ===
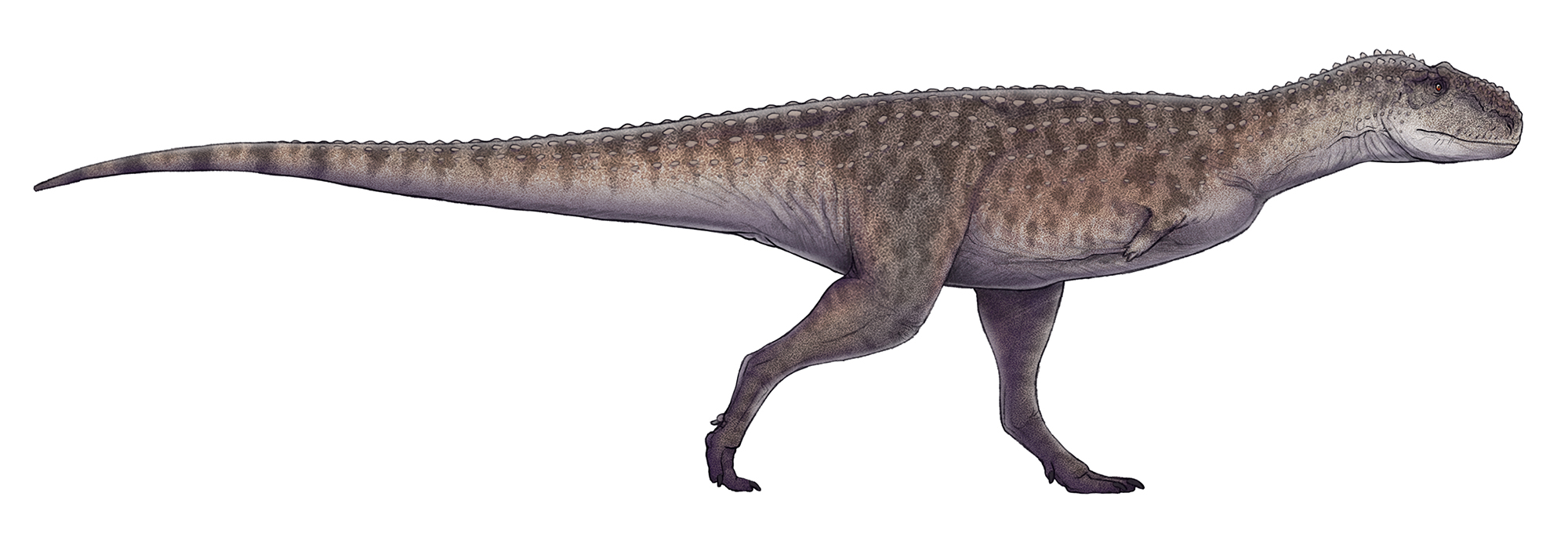
Life restoration

On the braincase, only the left sides of the parietal and frontal bones are preserved. The braincase is thick, with the frontals achieving a maximum thickness of 4 centimetres (1.6 in) above the eye socket. On the frontals near the midline is a path for the olfactory tract which is a part of smelling. The rims of the supratemporal fossae, depressions on either side of the top of the skull, form a low sagittal crest along the middle of the top of the skull. The front rims of the fossae are unusually steep. Abelisaurids, typically, had elongated fenestrae (holes in the skull) below the quadrate bone near the bottom of the skull, but Rajasaurus had elongated supratemporal fenestrae near the top of the skull. Unlike in other theropods but similar to Majungasaurus, the crista prootica, which is typically a ridge along the otic capsule bone in the ear, more so juts outward as a stump.

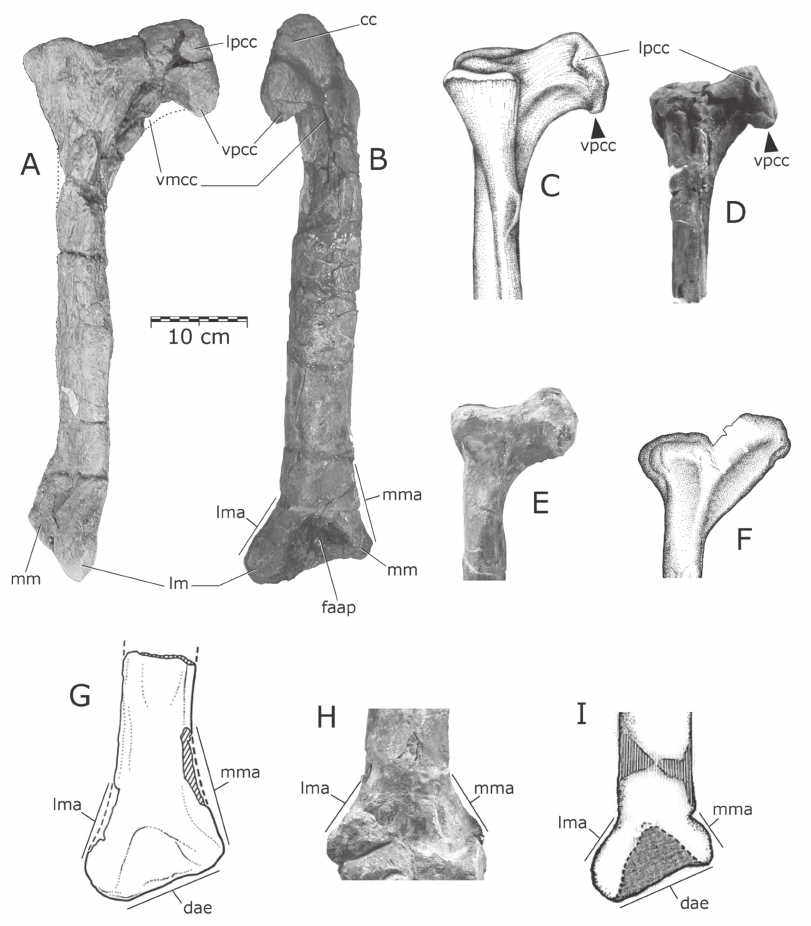
Abelisaurid tibiae; G is Rajasaurus

Rajasaurus had a low horn on its forehead that is primarily made of nasal bone more than frontal, unlike the horn on Majungasaurus. The horn in life was probably the same size as the fossilised horn, unlike in Carnotaurus where in life the horn was extended by a thickened layer skin. Though Rajasaurus, like Majungasaurus, did have a thickened layer of skin, it probably did not add to the overall length of the horn. A trough-like groove bordered by a raised wall is present where the frontal meets the nasal, decreasing in height and width towards the midline, serving to support the horn on the nasal.

=== Postcrania ===
Only one neck vertebra–likely a middle vertebra–is preserved, and it is proportionally shorter than that of other ceratosaurs, broader than is tall, and spool-shaped. Like in other ceratosaurs, the back face of the vertebra where it connects to another vertebra is very concave; however, unlike in other ceratosaurs, the front face is also concave. Like other ceratosaurs, the neck vertebra has two air pockets, though they are unusually close to the head. Eleven partial spool-shaped dorsal vertebrae were found, but only one–most likely the fourth thoracic vertebra–is well preserved; the faces are concave, and more deeper than broad, in contrast to the neck vertebra which is the opposite. These vertebrae contain many air pockets. The bottom-side of six sacral vertebrae are preserved; they are elongated and have a decreasing width towards the ends, and have no arching. Three partial tail vertebrae were found, likely from the middle-section of the tail, and they also have concave faces, but are more cylindrical than spool-shaped.

The part of the hip that juts out to attach to the ischium, the ischial peduncle, projects farther out than the pubic peduncle, which causes the hip-joint to be farther down on the back-underside of the hip. The iliac crests, on the other side of the hip from the ischium and pubic bone, are thin compared to the hip-joint area, 1 and 8 centimetres (0.39 and 3.15 in) respectively in thickness. The fibula, on the outside portion of the lower leg below the knee, decreases in width from top to bottom and is slightly concave. Similar to Ceratosaurus, the second metatarsal bone which connects the ankle bone to the second toe, is robust, has an oval-shaped and slightly concave joint between it and the ankle, and the width does not decrease as it gets nearer the toes. The fourth metatarsal bone has similar proportions to the second metatarsal. Both second metatarsals are preserved and only the left fourth metatarsal is preserved.

== Classification ==
Wilson, in 2003, assigned Rajasaurus to the subfamily Carnotaurinae, being more closely related to abelisaurids like Majungasaurus and the South American Carnotaurus than to African abelisaurids–as Africa, he believed, had separated from Gondwana first, and South America, India, and Madagascar were connected via Antarctica–on the basis of several similarities such as the presence of a sagittal crest, neck vertebrae with two air pockets, the configuration of the nasal bones, a fleshy growth ("excrescence") on the frontal bone, and a thick skull roof. However, if this were the case, then African abelisaurids would display endemism and not Rajasaurus. In 2008, palaeontologist Matthew Carrano created the subfamily Brachyrostra for South American abelisaurids as a sister taxon to Carnotaurinae, with the abelisaurids migrating through the Gondwanan continents via small land connections as they broke apart until they were completely separated in the Middle Cretaceous.

In 2014, the subfamily Majungasaurinae was erected by palaeontologist Thierry Tortosa to separate the newly discovered European Arcovenator, Majungasaurus, Indosaurus, Rahiolisaurus, and Rajasaurus from South American abelisaurids based on physical characteristics such as elongated antorbital fenestrae in front of the eye sockets, and a sagittal crest that widens into a triangular surface towards the front of the head. Despite large oceanic barriers, it has been suggested that a migration of abelisaurids took place in the Late Cretaceous between Africa, Europe, Madagascar, and India which ultimately isolated South American abelisaurids; it is possible that migration occurred between Europe and India across Africa given its proximity to both, and the volcanic Dras-Kohistan island arc may have allowed island hopping and an indirect path to Asia, though these are still questionable explanations.

The following cladogram was recovered by Tortosa (2014):

- Ceratosauria
  - Ceratosaurus
  - Noasauridae
  - - Abelisauridae
      - - Carnotaurinae
          - Carnotaurus
          - Abelisaurus
      - - Majungasaurinae
          - Rajasaurus
          - Majungasaurus
          - Indosaurus
          - Rahiolisaurus
          - Arcovenator

Rajasaurus is distinguished from other genera by its single forehead horn (though Majungasaurus also only has one), the elongated supratemporal fenestrae (holes in the upper rear of the skull), and the ilia bones on the hip which feature a ridge separating the brevis shelf from the hip joint.

== Palaeobiology ==
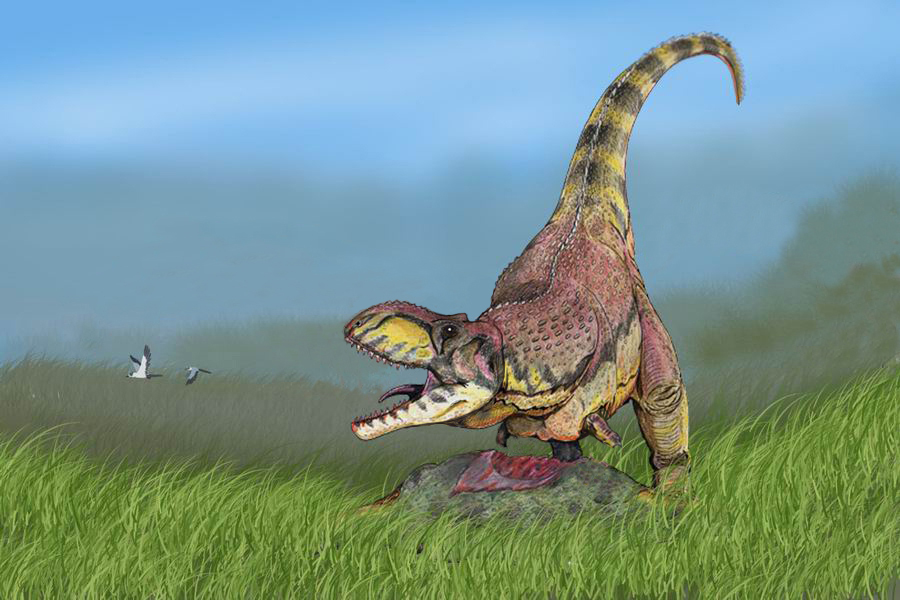
Restoration of Rajasaurus with prey

The horn of Rajasaurus could have been used for display or head-butting with other Rajasaurus individuals. Head-butting, inferred from the lack of shock-absorbing cancellous bone in the skull, could have been both or either low-motion shoving matches like modern day marine iguanas (Amblyrhynchus cristatus), or focused on the neck and the flank like giraffes (Giraffa spp.). The neck muscles, though, in abelisaurids were adapted for withstanding high stress. The horn could have been used for defending territory or for mating matches.

Abelisaurids may have been ambush predators, using a bite-and-hold tactic to hunt large prey. The leg bones of Majungasaurus are comparatively short to other similarly-sized theropods, suggesting the dinosaur was comparatively slower–this same condition is seen in Rajasaurus. However, ceratosaurs may have been able to rapidly accelerate.

== Palaeoecology ==
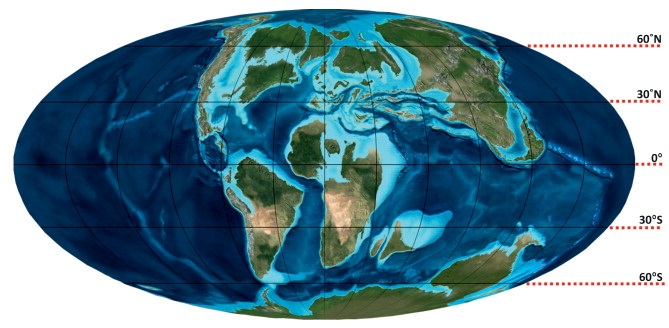
India was an island in the Late Cretaceous

Rajasaurus has been found in the Lameta Formation, a rock unit radiometrically dated to the Maastrichtian age of the latest Cretaceous representing an arid or semi-arid landscape with a river flowing through it–probably providing shrub cover near the water–which formed between episodes of volcanism in the Deccan Traps. Rajasaurus likely inhabited what is now the Narmada River Valley. The formation is known for being a sauropod nesting site, yielding several dinosaur eggs, and sauropod herds likely chose sandy soil for nesting; though eggs belonging to large theropods have been found, it is unknown if they belong to Rajasaurus. Sauropod coprolite remains indicate they lived in a forested landscape, consuming plants such as Podocarpus, Araucaria, and Cheirolepidiaceae conifers; cycads; palm trees; early grass; and Caryophyllaceae, Sapindaceae, and Acanthaceae flowering plants. Ferns were also common in India with Osmundaceae, Schizaeales, Dicksoniaceae, Gleicheniaceae and Salviniales being found. The prehistoric snake Sanajeh mainly raided the nests of sauropods for eggs, though it is possible it also targeted smaller theropod eggs.

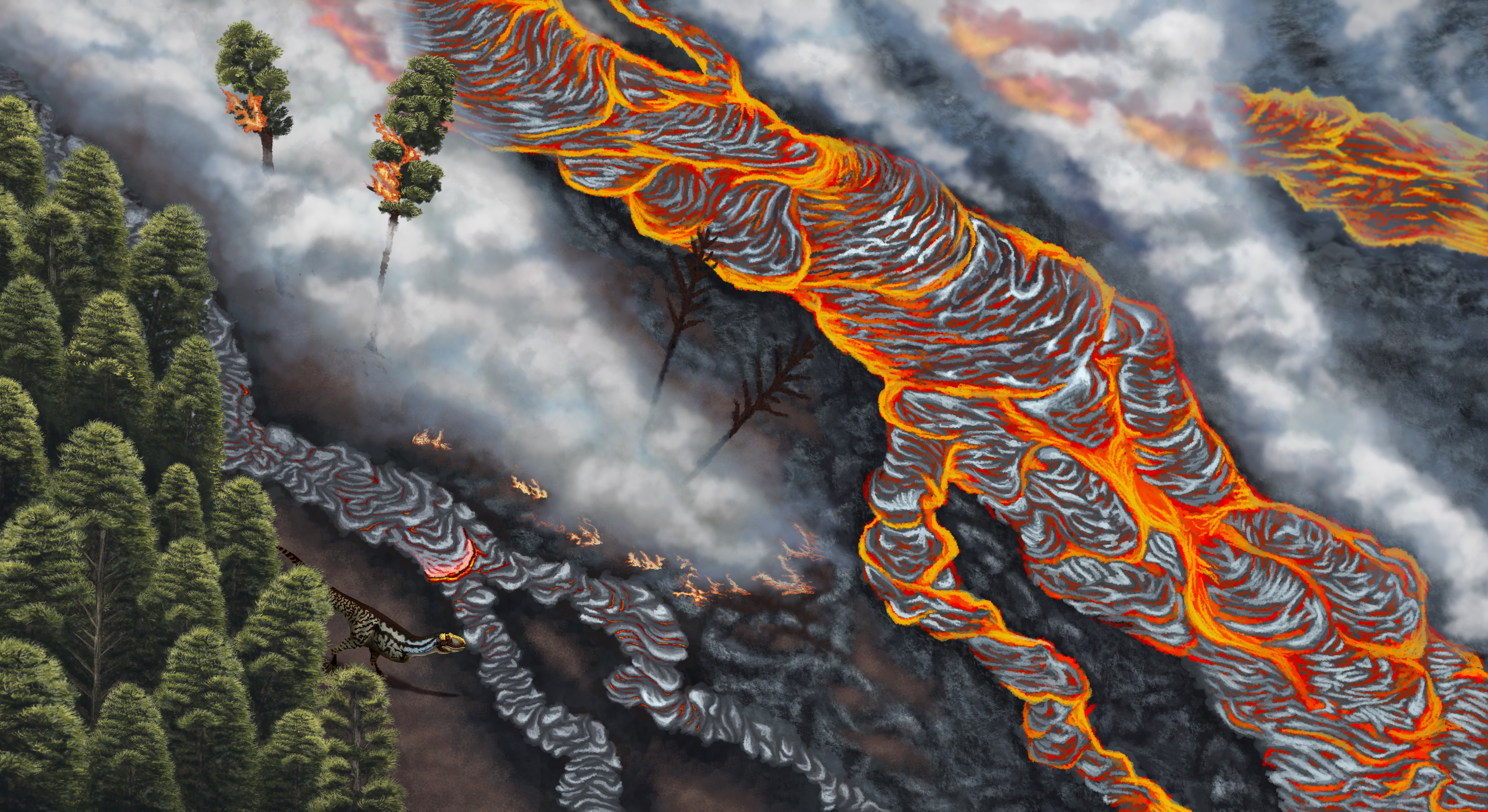
Rajasaurus and other dinosaurs would have faced intense volcanism due to the Deccan Traps

India, by the Late Cretaceous, had separated from Madagascar and South America during the break-up of Gondwana, and Rajasaurus lived on an isolated island, likely causing endemism and unique characteristics not seen in other abelisaurids. However, despite being an island, there is no evidence of endemic animals with unique traits from Late Cretaceous India, perhaps indicating a continued connection to other parts of the world, likely Africa due to its proximity. The similarity between European and Indian sauropod egg taxa suggests an inter-continental migration of animals between India, Europe, and South America during the Cretaceous, despite water barriers.

Several dinosaurs have been described from the Lameta Formation, such as the noasaurid Laevisuchus; abelisaurids Indosaurus, Indosuchus, Lametasaurus, and Rahiolisaurus; and the titanosaurian sauropods Jainosaurus, Titanosaurus, and Isisaurus. The diversity of abelisauroid and titanosaurian dinosaurs in Cretaceous India indicates they shared close affinities to the dinosaur life of the other Gondwanan continents, which had similar inhabitants.

While some authors have suggested that the Deccan Traps had a major adverse effect on the climate of India and its dinosaur inhabitants, others have suggested that the effects of the volcanism were relatively mild.

== Cultural significance ==
The Gujarat state has declared the fossil site in Balasinor a "dinosaur park," sometimes called the "Jurassic Park of India" in reference to the 1993 film, in response to the massive rush of tourism, with the crowning attraction being Rajasaurus. In Rahioli, a life-sized statue was erected in honour of its discovery. The Indian theme park Adlabs Imagica features the Rajasaurus River Adventure, a water ride following the fictional "Dr. Roy" through prehistoric times. Rajasaurus also appeared in the "Badlands" episode of Prehistoric Planet, where at least two individuals are shown hunting down Isisaurus hatchlings as they pass through the volcanic fields of the Deccan Traps.

== See also ==
- Timeline of ceratosaur research
- Dryptosauroides
- Compsosuchus
- Jubbulpuria
- Ornithomimoides
- Orthogoniosaurus
