= 1933 in paleontology =

Paleontology or palaeontology is the study of prehistoric life forms on Earth through the examination of plant and animal fossils. This includes the study of body fossils, tracks (ichnites), burrows, cast-off parts, fossilised feces (coprolites), palynomorphs and chemical residues. Because humans have encountered fossils for millennia, paleontology has a long history both before and after becoming formalized as a science. This article records significant discoveries and events related to paleontology that occurred or were published in the year 1933.

== Plants ==
=== Angiosperms ===
Name	Novelty	Status	Authors	Age	Unit	Location	Notes	Images
lodes multireticiilata	Sp nov	valid	Reid & Chandler	Ypresian	London Clay	UK; England	An icacinaceous species.	
Langtonia	Gen et sp nov	valid	Reid & Chandler	Ypresian	London Clay	UK; England	A tupelo relative, type species L. bisulcata.	
Palaeophytocrene	Gen et sp nov	valid	Reid & Chandler	Ypresian	London Clay	UK; England	An icacinaceous relative. Type species P. foveolata	
Tinomiscoidea	Gen et sp nov	valid	Reid & Chandler	Ypresian	London Clay	UK; England	A moon seed relative. Type species T. scaphiformis	

== Arthropods ==
=== Newly named crustaceans ===
Name	Novelty	Status	Authors	Age	Unit	Location	Notes	Images
Anthracocaris	Gen et comb nov	valid	Calman	Early Carboniferous		Scotland	A tanaid, type species is A. scotica (originally named as a species of Palaeocaris in 1882)	

=== Newly named insects ===
Name	Novelty	Status	Authors	Age	Unit	Location	Notes	Images
Electrostephanus brevicornis	Sp nov	valid	Brues	Lutetian	Baltic Amber	Russia	A stephanid wasp	
Electrostephanus petiolatus	Sp nov	valid	Brues	Lutetian	Baltic Amber	Russia	A stephanid wasp, Electrostephanus type species	Electrostephanus petiolatus
Electrostephanus tridentatus	Sp nov	jr synonym	Brues	Lutetian	Baltic Amber		A stephanid wasp, now Denaeostephanus tridentatus	

== Conodonts ==
=== Newly named conodonts ===
Name	Novelty	Status	Authors	Age	Unit	Location	Notes	Images
Wurmiella excavata	Sp nov	valid	Mehl and Branson	420 Millions of years ago		USA; Nevada		
Idiognathoides	Gen nov	valid	Harris and Hollingsworth	Pennsylvanian	Oklahoma	China; Mexico; USA (Kentucky and Wyoming)		
Cavusgnathus	Gen nov	valid	Harris and Hollingsworth	Pennsylvanian	Oklahoma	China; Mexico; Russia; UK; USA ( Alabama, Arkansas, Missouri, Montana, Nevada, Pennsylvania, Utah and Wyoming)		

== Dinosaurs ==
- Barnum Brown prospected the Two Medicine Formation, but found nothing significant.
- Lull published a monograph where he discusses AMNH 5244, a ceratopsian braincase.

=== New taxa ===
Name	Novelty	Status	Authors	Age	Type locality	Location	Notes	Images
Alectrosaurus olseni	Gen. et sp. nov.	Valid taxon	Gilmore	Santonian	Iren Dabasu Formation	Mongolia	A tyrannosauroid	
Antarctosaurus septentrionalis	Sp. nov.	Valid	Huene & Matley	Maastrichtian	Lameta Formation	India	A species of Antarctosaurus now Jainosaurus septentrionalis	
Austrosaurus mckillopi	Gen. et sp. nov.	Valid	Longman	Albian	Allaru Formation	Australia	A titanosauriform	
Bactrosaurus johnsoni	Gen. et sp. nov.	Valid	Gilmore	Santonian	Iren Dabasu Formation	China	A hadrosauroid	
Coeluroides largus	Gen. et sp. nov.	Nomen dubium	Huene & Matley	Maastrichtian	Lameta Formation	India	An abelisaur	
Compsosuchus solus	Gen. et sp. nov	Nomen dubium	Huene & Matley	Maastrichtian	Lameta Formation	India	A noasaurid	
Dryptosauroides grandis	Gen. et sp. nov.	Nomen dubium	Huene & Matley	Maastrichtian	Lameta Formation	India	A noasaurid	
Indosaurus matleyi	Gen. et so. nov.	Valid	Huene & Matley	Maastrichtian	Lameta Formation	India	An abelisaurid	
Indosuchus raptorius	Gen. et sp. nov.	Valid taxon	Huene & Matley	Maastrichtian	Lameta Formation	India	An abelisaurid	
Jubbulpuria tenuis	Gen. et sp. nov.	Nomen dubium	Huene & Matley	Maastrichtian	Lameta Formation	India	A noasaurid	
Laevisuchus indicus	Gen. et sp. nov	Valid	Huene & Matley	Maastrichtian	Lameta Formation	India	A noasaurid	
Mandschurosaurus mongoliensis	Sp. nov.	Valid	Gilmore	Santonian	Iren Dabasu Formation	China	A species of Mandschurosaurus now named Gilmoreosaurus mongoliensis	
Mongolosaurus haplodon	Gen. et sp. nov.	Valid	Gilmore	Aptian-Albian	On Gong Formation	China	A titanosaur	
Ornithomimoides mobilis	Gen. et sp. nov.	Nomen dubium	Huene & Matley	Maastrichtian	Lameta Formation	India	A noasaurid	
Ornithomimoides barasimlensis	Sp. nov.	Nomen dubium	Huene & Matley	Maastrichtian	Lameta Formation	India	A species of Ornithomimoides	
Ornithomimus asiaticus	Sp. nov.	Valid	Gilmore	Santonian	Iren Dabasu Formation	China	A species of Ornithomimus now named Archaeornithomimus asiaticus	
Pinacosaurus grangeri	Gen. et sp. nov.	Valid	Gilmore	Campanian	Djadochta Formation	Mongolia	An ankylosaurid	

== Synapsids ==
=== Non-mammalian ===
Name	Status	Authors	Discovery year	Age	Unit	Location	Notes	Images
Mucrotherium	Valid							
Uniserium	Valid							

== Other animals ==
Name	Novelty	Status	Authors	Age	Unit	Location	Notes	Images
Paramedusium	Gen. et sp. nov.		Gürich	Ediacaran		Namibia	A discoid fossil of uncertain affinity. The type species is P. africanum. Argued to be probably a junior synonym of Aspidella by Gehling et al. (2000).	
Pteridinium	Gen. et sp. nov.	Valid	Gürich	Ediacaran		Namibia	An erniettomorph. The type species is P. simplex.	
