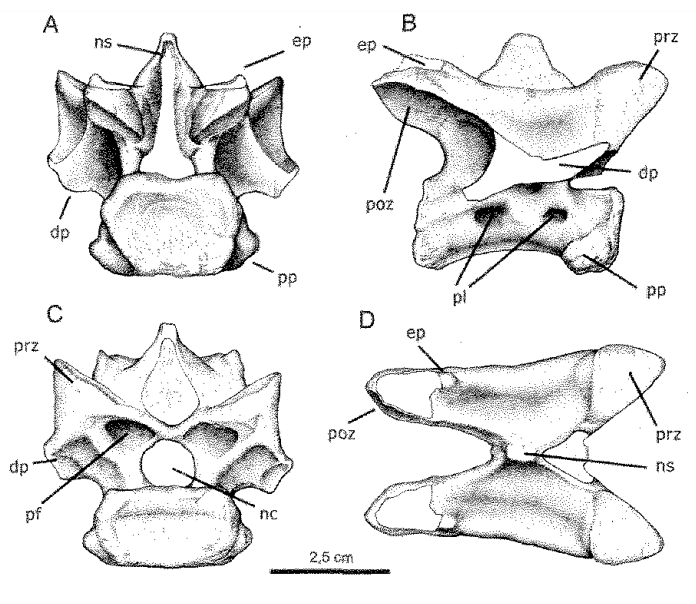
- Cervical vertebra K20/613 in multiple views

Scientific classification
- Kingdom: Animalia
- Phylum: Chordata
- Class: Reptilia
- Clade: Dinosauria
- Clade: Saurischia
- Clade: Theropoda
- Family: †Noasauridae
- Genus: †Laevisuchus; Huene & Matley, 1933

Type species
- †Laevisuchus indicus Huene & Matley, 1933

Synonyms
- Jubbulpuria tenuis? Huene & Matley, 1933

= Laevisuchus =

Laevisuchus Temporal range: Late Cretaceous, Maastrichtian

Extinct genus of dinosaurs

Laevisuchus (/ˌlɛvɪˈsjuːkəs/, "light crocodile") is a genus of theropod dinosaur from the Late Cretaceous. Its remains were discovered by Charles Alfred Matley near Jabalpur in Maastrichtian "Carnosaur Bed" deposits in the Lameta Formation in Madhya Pradesh, central India, and were named and described by paleontologists Friedrich von Huene and Matley in 1933.

== Discovery ==
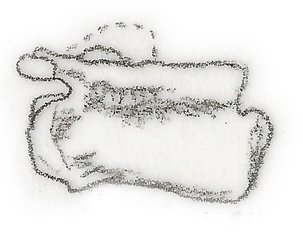
Jubbulpuria vertebra, now referred to Laevisuchus

The type species is Laevisuchus indicus. The generic name is derived from Latin laevis, "light" and the Greek name for the ancient Egyptian crocodile god, Soukhos. The specific name means "Indian" in Latin. It is known only from three cervical vertebrae (GSI K20/613, GSI K20/614, and GSI K27/696) and a dorsal vertebra (GSI K27/588). A holotype was not assigned by Huene and Matley, and a lectotype has never been chosen from the syntypes. All remains except GSI K27/696 were lost, though GSI K20/613 was rediscovered in 2012. A 2024 revision of the small-bodied theropods from India classified Jubbulpuria tenuis as a junior synonym of Laevisuchus, and suggested that other taxa (Compsosuchus solus and Ornithomimoides? barasimlensis) are likely indeterminate abelisaurs.

== Description ==
Laevisuchus was a small bipedal carnivore about the same size as Masiakasaurus, which is estimated to be around 2 metres (6.6 ft) in length. It was described on the basis of cervical (GSI K20/614, GSI K20/613, GSI K27/696) and dorsal vertebrae (GSI K27/588), being distinguished by blunt pre- and postzygapophyses, shorter proportions, and a central neural spine position in dorsal view, unlike the relative Masiakasaurus. Its broader neural arch and deeper incisions in spinopostzygapophyseal laminae differentiate it from Noasaurus.

GSI K27/696 features a neural arch significantly broader and longer than the centrum, creating a top-heavy look. Pneumatopores on its sides and uneven joint surfaces accentuate this look, while pronounced parapophyses suggest ventral expansion. The referred caudal vertebrae GSI K20/612 and GSI K27/614 (Jubbulpuria) are similar in size and shape, potentially from the same Laevisuchus specimen. The former lacks features such as the transverse processes and neural spine, and the latter is slightly stouter, indicating a more proximal tail position. A partial right dentary RTMNU/DG/VERT/1/55P/2020, shares features with the noasaurid Masiakasaurus, and, while it wasn't formally referred to as Laevisuchus, it was suggested to come from it or a related form.

== Classification ==
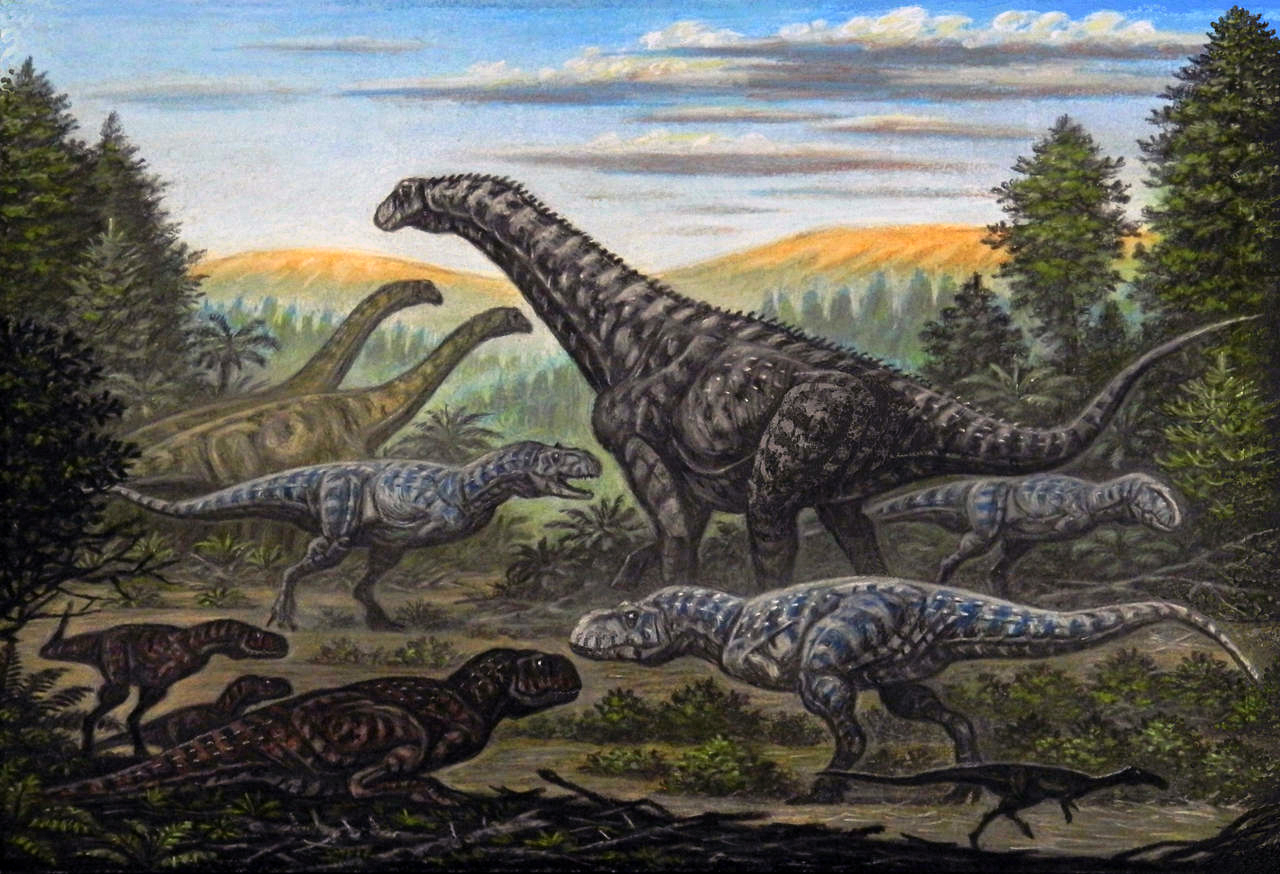
Life restoration of Laevisuchus (lower right) with contemporary dinosaurs

Laevisuchus was originally classified by Huene as a "coelurid" due to the similarity of its vertebrae with those of the Coelurosaur Aristosuchus. However, an analysis in 2004 has shown it to be an abelisauroid because of its long epipophyses, a pair of foramina on the centrum, and low and triangular neural spines. The vertebrae specifically resemble those of noasaurids like Masiakasaurus and Noasaurus due to having more anteriorly placed neural spines and posteriorly reduced epipophyses. The Jubbulpuria material was originally classified by Huene as another "coelurid" similar to but smaller than Coeluroides, another poorly known theropod from the Lameta Formation.

Laevisuchus type locality in Carnosaur beds, Bara Simla, Jabalpur, Madhya Pradesh, India

In 2024, Laevisuchus was recovered as a member of the Noasauridae, in an unresolved position outside the clade that includes Masiakasaurus and Noasaurus. Jubbulpuria was also considered a possible synonym of Laevisuchus. Later in 2024, Hendrickx et al. recovered Noasaurus in a polytomy with Laevisuchus, Masiakasaurus, Velocisaurus, and Vespersaurus, likely representing a radiation of small-bodied noasaurids that occurred during the Late Cretaceous.

== See also ==
- Timeline of ceratosaur research
- Jubbulpuria
