= Chiappe =

Chiappe is a surname. Notable people with the surname include:

- Luis M. Chiappe, Argentine paleontologist
- Jean Chiappe, high-ranking French civil servant
- María Luisa Chiappe, Colombian economist, diplomat, civil servant and businesswoman
- Sandro Mariátegui Chiappe, Peruvian politician
