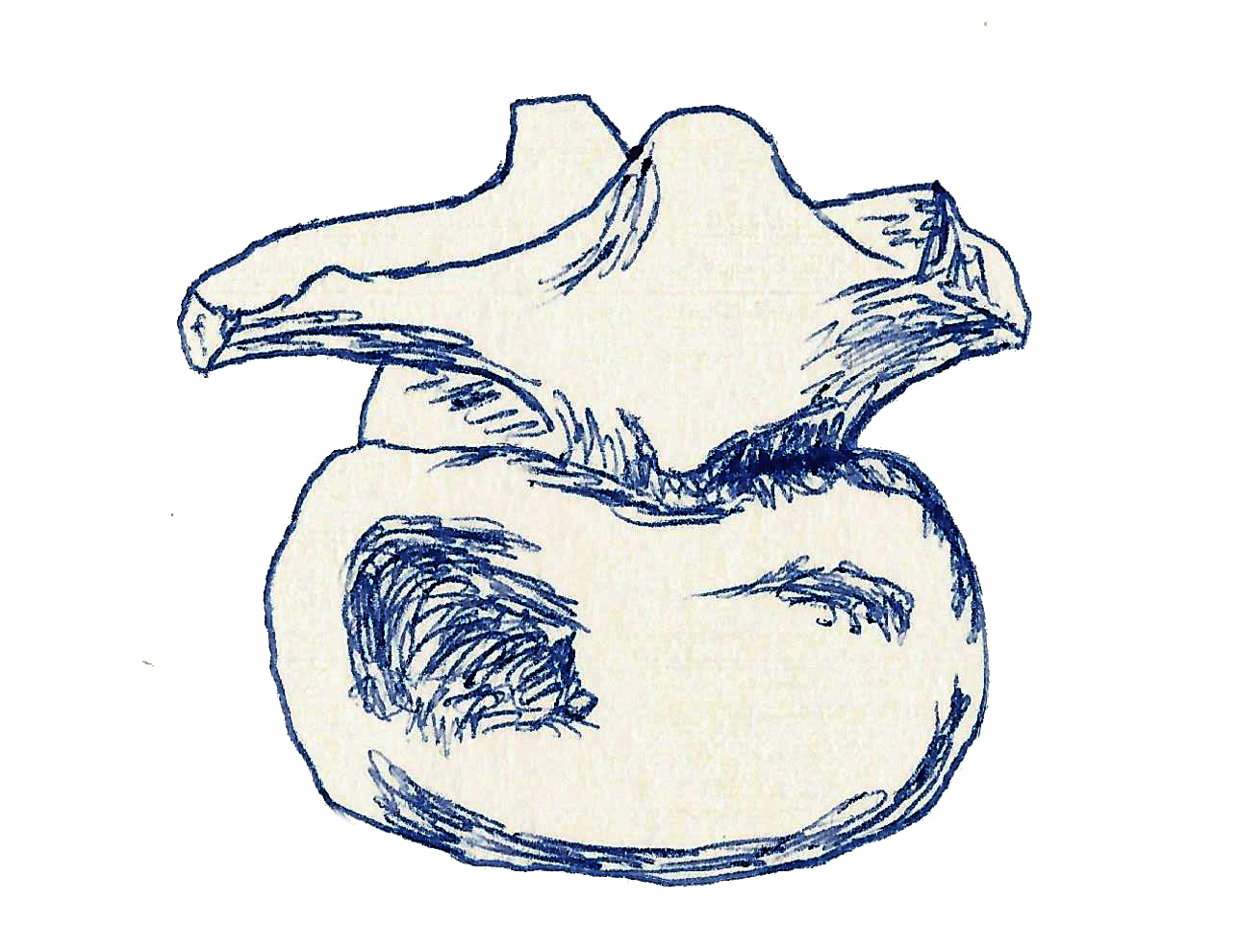
- Caudal vertebra

Scientific classification
- Kingdom: Animalia
- Phylum: Chordata
- Class: Reptilia
- Clade: Dinosauria
- Clade: Saurischia
- Clade: Theropoda
- Genus: †Coeluroides von Huene and Matley, 1933
- Species: †C. largus

Binomial name
- †Coeluroides largus Huene & Matley, 1933

= Coeluroides =

Coeluroides Temporal range: Late Cretaceous, 66 Ma

Extinct genus of dinosaurs

Coeluroides ("hollow tail form") is an extinct genus of theropod dinosaur that lived during the Late Cretaceous Period in what is now India. It is based solely on the holotype caudal vertebrae GSI K27/562, K27/574 and K27/595, discovered in a layer of the Lameta Formation. The type species, C. largus, was described by Friedrich von Huene and Charles Alfred Matley in 1933.

When fully grown, Coeluroides is estimated to be 2 metres (6.6 ft) long and perhaps 30 kilograms (66 lb) in weight, similar to but larger than Jubbulpuria. Coeluroides was long considered a nomen dubium because of sparse remains, but a 2004 overview of Indian theropods from the Lameta Formation found it to be probably valid. An SVP 2012 abstract considers it as a possible senior synonym of Ornithomimoides.

== See also ==
- Timeline of ceratosaur research
- Jubbulpuria
