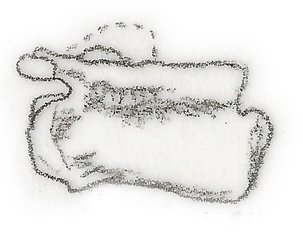
- Vertebra

Scientific classification
- Kingdom: Animalia
- Phylum: Chordata
- Class: Reptilia
- Clade: Dinosauria
- Clade: Saurischia
- Clade: Theropoda
- Clade: †Ceratosauria
- Genus: †Jubbulpuria; Huene & Matley, 1933

Type species
- Jubbulpuria tenuis Huene & Matley, 1933

= Jubbulpuria =

Jubbulpuria Temporal range: Late Cretaceous, 70–66 Ma

Extinct genus of dinosaurs

Jubbulpuria ("Jubbulpore one") is the name given to a dubious genus of theropod dinosaur from the Late Cretaceous Lameta Formation of India.

== Discovery and naming ==
Jubbulpuria type locality in Carnosaur beds, Bara Simla, Jabalpur, Madhya Pradesh, India

The genus was in 1932 named by Friedrich von Huene. The generic name refers to Jabalpur in India, in the vicinity of which the fossils were found. The type species, Jubbulpuria tenuis, was described by Huene and Charles Alfred Matley in 1933. The specific name means "slender" in Latin.

Its fossil specimens were found by Matley in 1917-19 or 1932 within the Lameta Formation, dating from the Maastrichtian. They consist of two syntypes, GSI K27/614 and GSI K20/612, each being a partial distal caudal vertebra. A third distal tail vertebra, GSI K27/599, has been referred to the species.

== Description ==
Jubbulpuria was a small predator, estimated to have been 0.5 metres (1 ft 8 in) high, 1.2 metres (3 ft 11 in) long, and weighing several kilograms.

== Classification ==
Jubbulpuria was originally classified by Huene as a coelurid dinosaur similar to but smaller than Coeluroides, another poorly known theropod from the Lameta Formation. Recent researchers have concluded that its position is hard to determine with any certainty beyond a general Theropoda incertae sedis, and that it should be considered a nomen dubium. It may have been a ceratosaur. A 2024 study identified Jubbulpuria as a junior synonym of Laevisuchus.

== See also ==
- Timeline of ceratosaur research
