= Orthogoniosaurus =

Orthogoniosaurus Temporal range: Late Cretaceous, 66 Ma

Scientific classification
- Kingdom: Animalia
- Phylum: Chordata
- Class: Reptilia
- Clade: Dinosauria
- Clade: Saurischia
- Clade: Theropoda
- Genus: †Orthogoniosaurus; Das-Gupta, 1931
- Species: †O. matleyi

Binomial name
- †Orthogoniosaurus matleyi Das-Gupta, 1930

Possible species
- †O. rawesi? Lydekker, 1890

Synonyms
- "Massospondylus" rawesi? Lydekker, 1890

Extinct genus of dinosaurs

Orthogoniosaurus (meaning "straight angled lizard", referring to the straight posterior edge of its type tooth) is a dubious genus of theropod dinosaur from the Late Cretaceous (late Maastrichtian) Lameta Formation of Jabalpur, India. It is based on one small, fragmentary tooth, with the preserved section measuring 2.7 cm (1.1 in) long.

Because it is the earliest published name for a Lameta theropod, it has sometimes been used as a synonym for other contemporaneous theropods, such as Indosaurus and Indosuchus. As a tooth taxon, however, such usage has been discouraged. Ralph Molnar in 1990 noted that the form of the tooth was much like that of teeth from the rear of theropod jaws, although the lack of serrations on the leading edge was unusual. In 2004 it was considered to be a dubious ceratosaur. Later studies have considered it to be an abelisaurid.

"Massospondylus" rawesi, another tooth taxon, is sometimes given as a second species. It was suggested that the tooth may not be dinosaurian, and could be substantially older. However, more recent research agrees on a Cretaceous age, and the tooth likely pertains to a theropod, possibly an abelisaurid.

== See also ==
- Timeline of ceratosaur research
