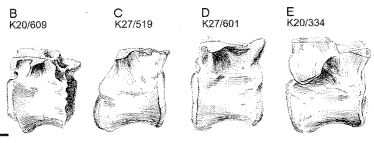
- Vertebrae from the holotype

Scientific classification
- Kingdom: Animalia
- Phylum: Chordata
- Class: Reptilia
- Clade: Dinosauria
- Clade: Saurischia
- Clade: Theropoda
- Family: †Abelisauridae
- Genus: †Dryptosauroides; Huene, 1932 vide Huene & Matley, 1933
- Species: †D. grandis

Binomial name
- †Dryptosauroides grandis Huene & Matley, 1933

= Dryptosauroides =

Dryptosauroides Temporal range: Late Cretaceous, 66 Ma

Extinct genus of dinosaurs

Dryptosauroides (meaning "similar in form to Dryptosaurus") is a dubious genus of possibly abelisauroid theropod dinosaur from the Late Cretaceous (Maastrichtian) Lameta Formation of India. It has been estimated at 10 metres (33 ft) long and 1.5 tonnes (1.7 short tons) in weight.

Its fossils consist of six caudal vertebrae, together forming type specimens GSI IM K20/334, 609, K27/549, 601, 602 and 626. The vertebrae, originally incorrectly identified as dorsals, are 13 to 14 centimetres (5.1 to 5.5 in) long. These remains are today commonly considered to be indistinguishable from those of other theropods from the same formation. A cervical vertebra, four rib heads, and a dorsal rib have also been assigned to Dryptosauroides (D. sp.), but they may have belonged to a different theropod.

The type species, Dryptosauroides grandis, was named by Friedrich von Huene in 1932 and described by him and Charles Alfred Matley in 1933. The specific name grandis means "large" in Latin.

== See also ==
- Timeline of ceratosaur research
