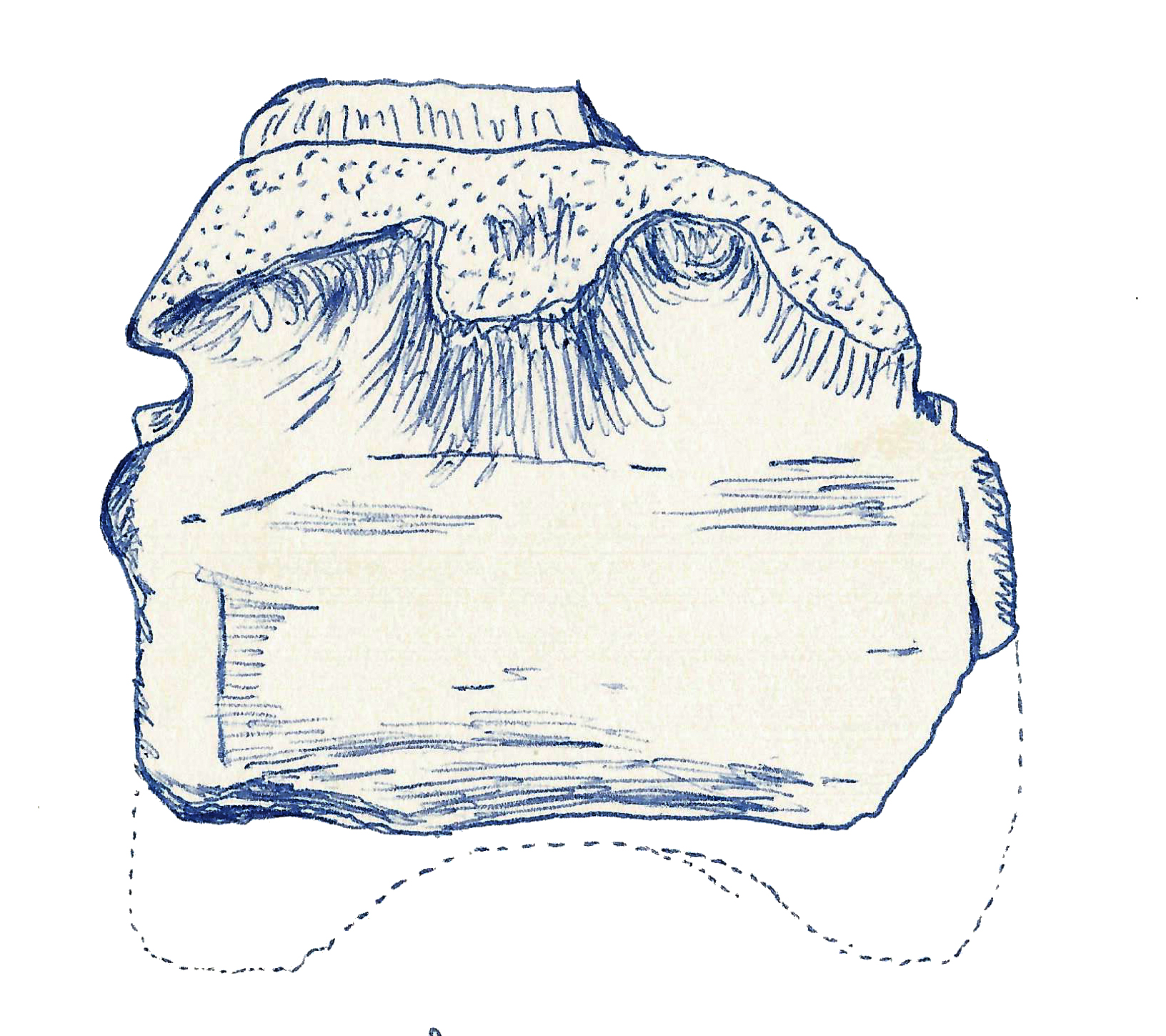
- Illustration of a partial vertebra of O. mobilis, specimen K20/610

Scientific classification
- Domain: Eukaryota
- Kingdom: Animalia
- Phylum: Chordata
- Clade: Dinosauria
- Clade: Saurischia
- Clade: Theropoda
- Family: †Abelisauridae
- Genus: †Ornithomimoides; Huene, 1932 vide Huene and Matley, 1933

Type species
- †Ornithomimoides mobilis von Huene and Matley, 1933

Other species
- †O. barasimlensis(?) von Huene and Matley, 1933

Synonyms
- Coeluroides? von Huene and Matley, 1933

= Ornithomimoides =

Ornithomimoides Temporal range: Late Cretaceous, 70–66 Ma

Extinct genus of dinosaurs

Ornithomimoides ("bird mimic-like") is a dubious genus of theropod dinosaur, from the Late Cretaceous (Maastrichtian stage, sometime between 70 and 66 mya) Lameta Formation of India. Two species have been identified, the type species O. mobilis and O. barasimlensis, were named by von Huene in 1932 and were described by Matley in 1933 though they are known only from isolated vertebrae. O. barasimlensis is known from five dorsal vertebrae, and O. mobilis from four smaller vertebrae, found at the same location.

Ornithomimoides (both species O. mobilis and O. barasimlensis) type locality in Carnosaur beds, Bara Simla, Jabalpur, Madhya Pradesh, India

It is possible that, based on three reviews, published in 1999, 2004 and 2024 respectively, Ornithomimoides may have been an abelisaur, which may have measured between 6.2 metres (20 ft) and 9 metres (30 ft) in length.

== See also ==
- Timeline of ceratosaur research
