= Charles Alfred Matley =

British paleontologist and geologist

Charles Alfred Matley (4 February 1866–1947) was a British civil servant who also spent his spare time as an amateur paleontologist and geologist. During his postings as a civil servant in various places including in India and Wales, he conducted geological studies in his spare time. He retired from the civil service in 1920 and was made a government geologist posted to work in Jamaica in 1922 but the survey position was ended in 1924. The dinosaur Indosaurus matleyi is named after him.

== Life and work ==
Matley was born in Birmingham. He went to King Edward's School and initially sought to become a school teacher. He then joined the civil service, starting his career in the banking department of the General Post Office in London. From 1890 he worked in the accounts section of the war office in Birmingham. He attended evening classes at the Mason Science College where he took lectures in geology Charles Lapworth. The College became a part of Birmingham University in 1900. He received an external BSc degree from the University of London in 1894. While working at the war office he taught at the Birmingham and Midland Institute in the evenings and conducted geology research on the weekends in northern Anglesey. This work on the Precambrian and Lower Paleozoic of northwest Wales led to a thesis that earned him a doctorate in geology (D.Sc.) from the University of London in July 1902. He was transferred to the Army Audit Office in Dublin in 1902 and during this period he collaborated with A. Vaughan on the local geology. In 1905 he was posted to Edinburgh where he studied the Fife coast. In 1913 he went to India as an auditor for the ordinance factories and here he transferred to the Indian Civil Service. He examined the Jabalpur region where he discovered dinosaur fossils.

After retiring from the civil service in 1920, he travelled through South Africa back to England and was appointed Government Geologist for the geological survey (1922-1924) of Jamaica and under his tenure a ground water assessment for the island was prepared. In addition, while on the island he collected one of the most extensive collection of Jamaican fossils.

Matley was awarded the Murchison Medal in 1929 by the Geological Society of London.

He married Ann Loach in Birmingham in 1891. After the Jamaican geology survey ended in 1924, he and his wife travelled around the region. He studied the geology of the Barbados region in 1929. The couple lived in Leamington Spa, Warwickshire. Ann died in 1942 and he died in 1947.

=== Work in India ===
Matley's first discoveries of fossils in India happened in 1917 to 1920 near Jabalpur. After his retirement he was able to conduct more geological and paleontological surveys in 1932-33 with support from the Percy Sladen Trust, the Gloyne Fund, the British Museum (Natural History) and the Geological Survey of India in the Central Provinces of India, particularly in the region around Jabalpur in present-day Madhya Pradesh. He excavated fossils from the Lameta Formation in 1919, a Late Cretaceous geological unit known for its rich dinosaur-bearing deposits. Matley's collections from the Jabalpur area included remains of sauropod dinosaurs, notably species of Titanosaurus, Jainosaurus, as well as theropod material. These finds formed the basis of a major monograph co-authored with the German palaeontologist Friedrich von Huene, titled The Cretaceous Saurischia and Ornithischia of the Central Provinces of India (1933), published by the Palaeontologia Indica. His work remains a foundational reference in Indian dinosaur palaeontology. Matley also described reptilian and amphibian fauna from the Lameta beds, contributing to the broader understanding of the Mesozoic fauna of the Indian subcontinent.
