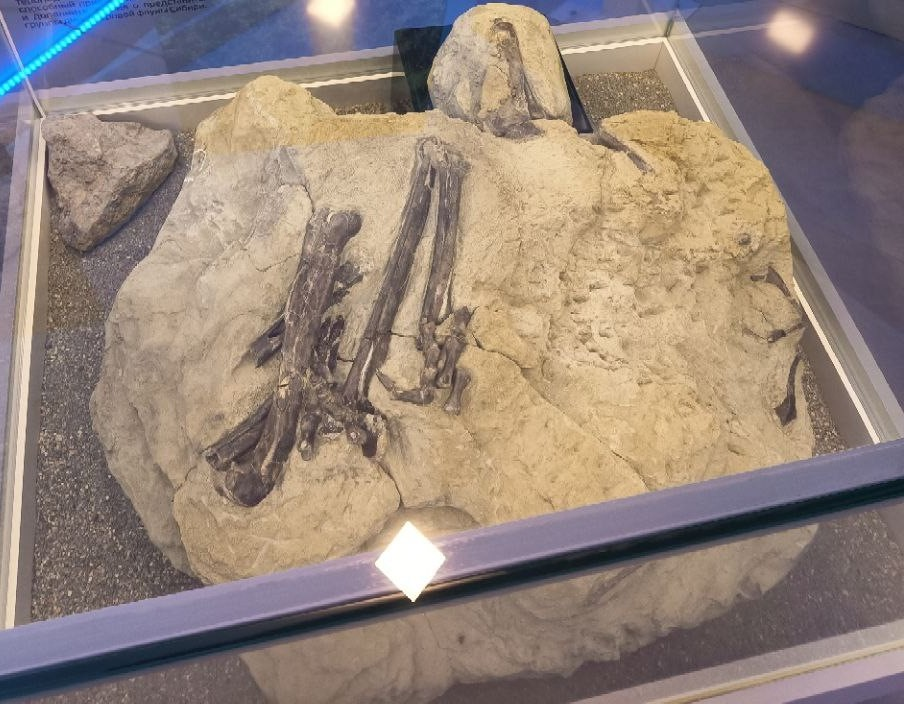
- Holotype specimen

Scientific classification
- Kingdom: Animalia
- Phylum: Chordata
- Class: Reptilia
- Clade: Dinosauria
- Clade: Saurischia
- Clade: Theropoda
- Family: †Noasauridae
- Genus: †Kiyacursor; Averianov et al., 2024
- Species: †K. longipes

Binomial name
- †Kiyacursor longipes Averianov et al., 2024

= Kiyacursor =

Kiyacursor Temporal range: Early Cretaceous, Aptian

Genus of theropod dinosaurs

Kiyacursor (meaning "Kiya River runner") is an extinct genus of noasaurid theropod dinosaur from the Early Cretaceous Ilek Formation of Russia. The genus contains a single species, K. longipes, known from a partial skeleton. Kiyacursor represents the first Early Cretaceous ceratosaur discovered in Asia, as well as the second non-avian theropod named from Russia, after Kileskus in 2010.

== Discovery and naming ==
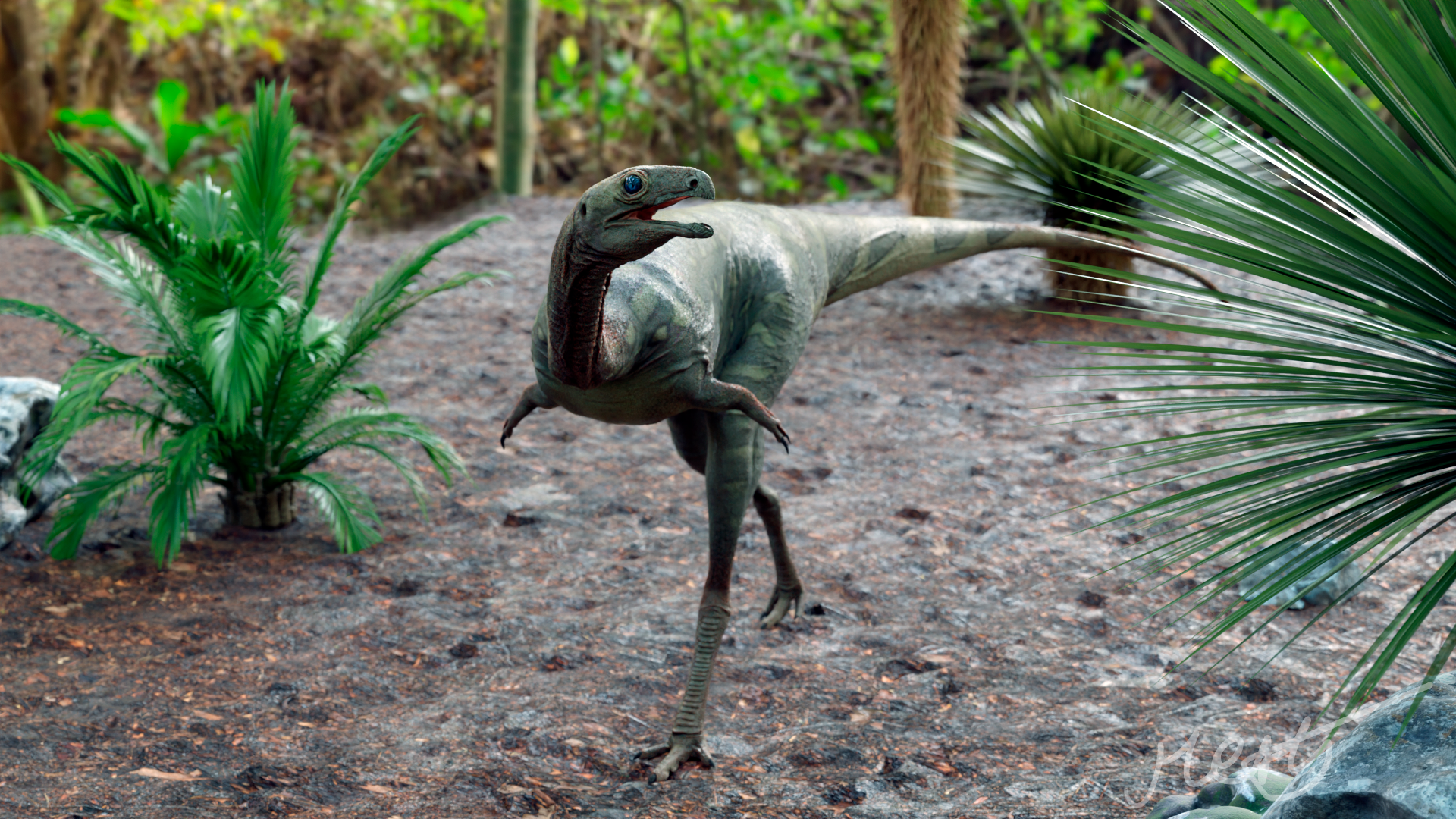
Life restoration

The Kiyacursor holotype specimen, KOKM 5542, was discovered in the summer of 2023 in sediments of the Ilek Formation (Shestakovo 1 locality) by the Kiya River in Kemerovo Oblast, Russia. The specimen consists of an incomplete skeleton, including cervical and caudal vertebrae, cervical and dorsal ribs, a left scapulocoracoid, humeri, and much of both articulated hind limbs.

A partial cervical vertebra, PIN 329/16, was first described in 2023 by Averianov & Lopatin as belonging to a long-necked theropod similar to basal therizinosauroids like Falcarius. Since this specimen was found in the same locality as the Kiyacursor holotype, Averianov et al. (2024) suggested that the vertebra may represent the same individual as KOKM 5542.

In early 2024, the name "Kiyacursor" (alternatively spelled "Kyacursor") was first mentioned in online sources, including press and social media, but remained a nomen nudum as the peer-reviewed description had not yet been published.

Later that year, Averianov and colleagues formally described Kiyacursor longipes as a new genus and species of noasaurid theropod based on these fossil remains. The generic name, Kiyacursor, combines a reference to the Kiya River near the type locality with the Latin word "cursor", meaning "runner". The specific name, longipes, combines the Latin words "longus", meaning "long", and "pes", meaning "foot".

== Description ==
Size of Kiyacursor compared to a human

Averianov et al. (2024) estimated the body length of Kiyacursor at 2.5 metres (8.2 ft). Based on paleohistological studies, they suggested that the holotype individual was an immature subadult when it died, having lived for three years or more. As such, it would have been larger as an adult.

The third metatarsal of Kiyacursor is large, and the second metatarsal is significantly reduced. A similar morphology is observed in the related Elaphrosaurus and Limusaurus, as well as the extant ostrich. This suggests that Kiyacursor likely possessed notable cursorial abilities, being capable of running at high speeds.

== Classification ==
In the strict consensus tree of their phylogenetic analyses, Averianov et al. (2024) recovered Kiyacursor in a clade of basal noasaurids along with Afromimus and an unnamed specimen from the Eumeralla Formation of Australia, which, in turn, is the sister taxon to the clade formed by the Noasaurinae and Elaphrosaurinae. These results are displayed in the cladogram below:

- Abelisauroidea
  - Abelisauridae
  - Noasauridae
    - - Afromimus
      - Kiyacursor
      - Eumeralla Formation taxon
    - - Noasaurinae
        - Vespersaurus
        - - Masiakasaurus
          - Noasaurus
      - Elaphrosaurinae
        - Velocisaurus
        - - Limusaurus
          - - CCG 20011 (Shaximiao noasaurid)
            - Elaphrosaurus

== Paleoecology ==
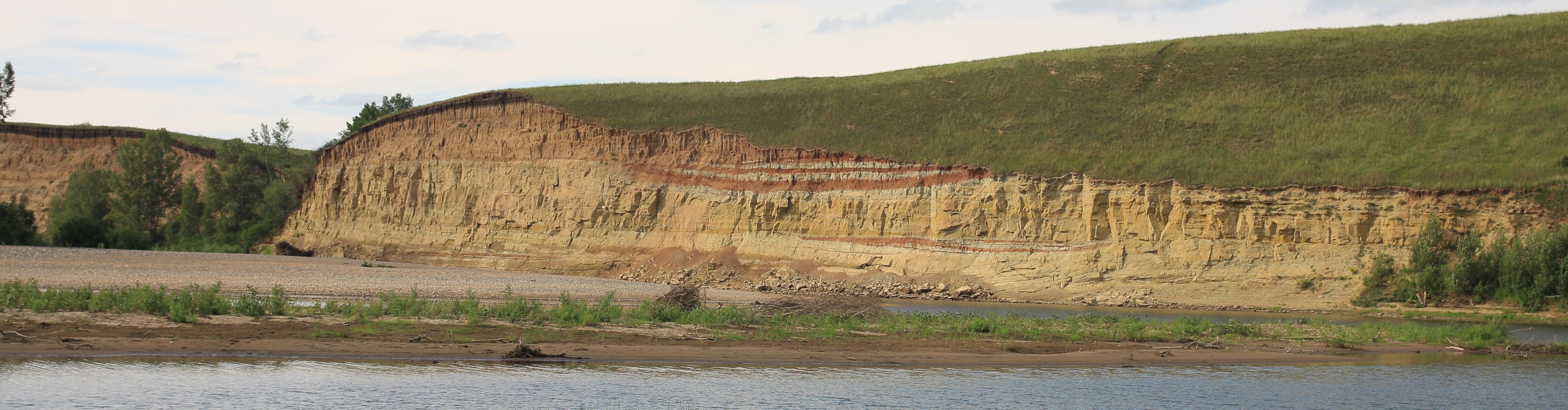
Shestakovo 1 locality, where the Kiyacursor holotype was found

Kiyacursor was found in outcrops of the Ilek Formation, which dates to the Aptian age of the Early Cretaceous. Other non-avian dinosaurs named from the formation include the early ceratopsian Psittacosaurus sibiricus and the somphospondylan sauropod Sibirotitan. Remains of birds (Evgenavis and Mystiornis) and indeterminate dinosaurs (including theropods, sauropods, and stegosaurs) have also been discovered. Fossil pterosaurs, crocodylomorphs, turtles, lizards, various synapsids (including mammaliaforms), and amphibians are also known from the formation. Many of these animals represent relict populations of groups otherwise known from the Jurassic, suggesting that this area of Siberia was a refugium for them.
