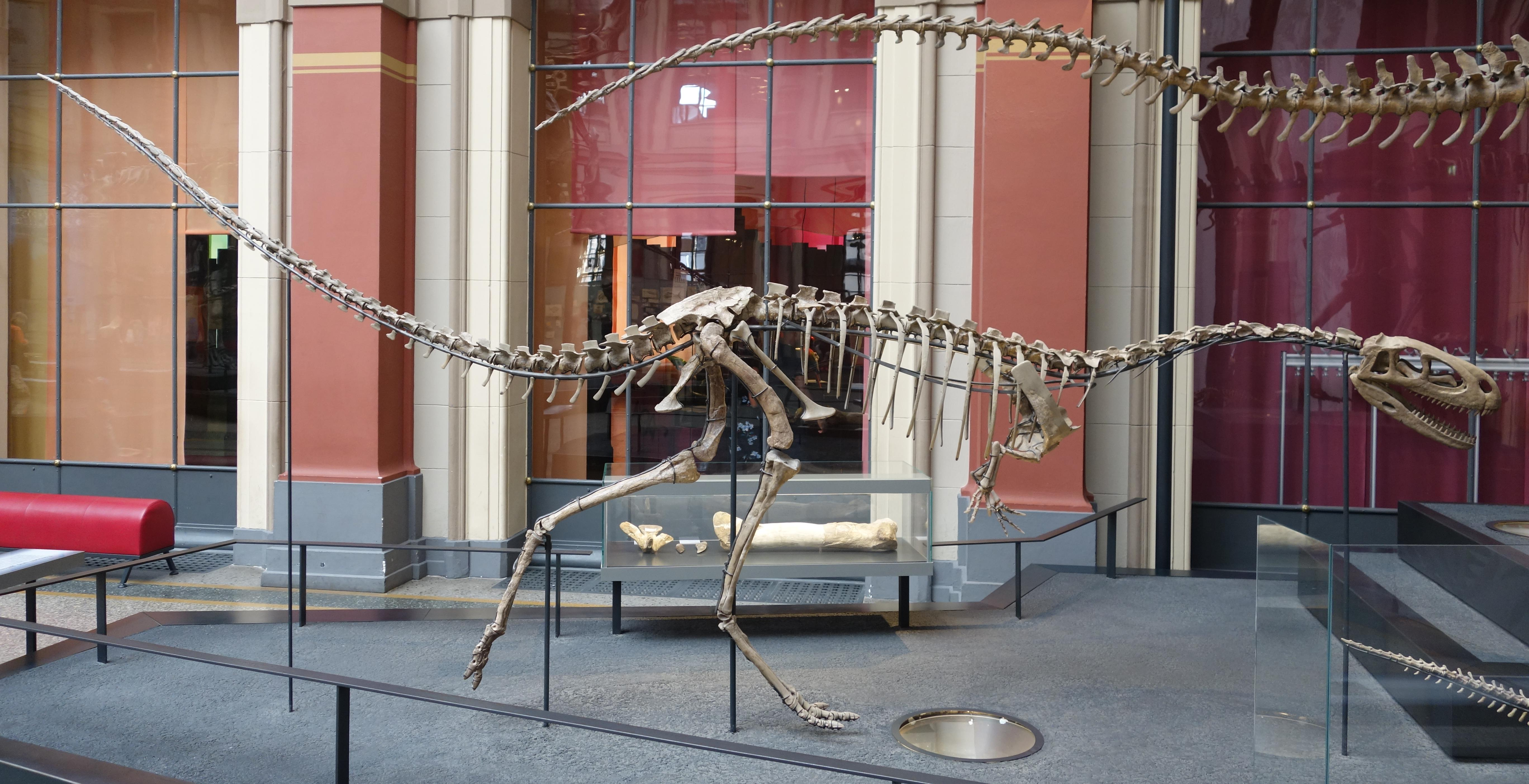
- Holotype skeleton mounted (skull, hands and other elements speculative and likely outdated), Natural History Museum of Berlin

Scientific classification
- Kingdom: Animalia
- Phylum: Chordata
- Class: Reptilia
- Clade: Dinosauria
- Clade: Saurischia
- Clade: Theropoda
- Family: †Noasauridae
- Subfamily: †Elaphrosaurinae
- Genus: †Elaphrosaurus; Janensch, 1920
- Species: †E. bambergi

Binomial name
- †Elaphrosaurus bambergi Janensch, 1920

= Elaphrosaurus =

Elaphrosaurus Temporal range: Late Jurassic (Kimmeridgian to Tithonian), 155–145 Ma

Ceratosaurian theropod dinosaur genus from the Late Jurassic Period

Elaphrosaurus (/ɛˌlɑːfroʊˈsɔːrəs/ el-AH-froh-SOR-əs) is a genus of ceratosaurian theropod dinosaur that lived approximately 155 to 145 million years ago during the Late Jurassic Period in what is now Tanzania in Africa. Elaphrosaurus was a medium-sized but lightly built member of the group that could grow up to 6.2 m (20 ft) long. Morphologically, this dinosaur is significant in two ways. Firstly, it has a relatively long body but is very shallow-chested for a theropod of its size. Secondly, it has very short hindlimbs in comparison with its body. Phylogenetic analyses indicate that this genus is likely a ceratosaur. Earlier suggestions that it is a late surviving coelophysoid have been examined but generally dismissed. Elaphrosaurus is currently believed to be a very close relative of Limusaurus, an unusual beaked ceratosaurian which may have been either herbivorous or omnivorous.

== Discovery ==
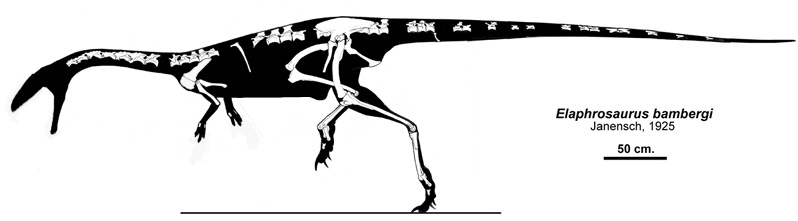
Skeletal restoration of elements recovered from 1920 to 1925

The type specimen of Elaphrosaurus bambergi HMN Gr.S. 38–44 was recovered in the Middle Dinosaur Member of the Tendaguru Formation of Lindi Region in Tanzania. The specimen was collected by Werner Janensch, I. Salim, H. Reck, and Parkinson in 1910 in gray, green, red, sandy marl that was deposited during the Kimmeridgian stage of the Jurassic period, approximately 157 to 152 million years ago. This specimen is housed in the collection of the Natural History Museum of Berlin, Germany.

Elaphrosaurus was described and named by Werner Janensch in 1920 and the type species is Elaphrosaurus bambergi. The genus name Elaphrosaurus is derived from the Greek words elaphros (ελαφρός) meaning "light to bear" as in "light-footed", a reference to its presumed high running speed and "sauros" (σαῦρος) meaning "lizard"; thus, "light-footed lizard". The specific name honours the industrialist Paul Bamberg for his financial support of the Tendaguru expeditions.

HMN Gr.S. 38–44 consists of 18 presacral vertebrae, 5 sacral vertebrae, 20 caudal vertebrae, a pelvic girdle, a nearly complete left hindlimb (missing only some phalanges), several isolated metacarpals, and a humerus. In 1925, Janesch referred two rib fragments, dorsal vertebrae, and a manual phalanx he believed to be phalanx II-2. However, the referred vertebrae has been lost and the manual phalanx (now considered to be phalanx I-1) cannot be evaluated as belonging to Elaphrosaurus. In 1929, he also referred to Elaphrosaurus both scapulocoracoids, two more rib fragments, and a radius (although the radius, being proportionally long and from a different stratigraphic horizon, likely does not belong to this species). Many bones were damaged by calcite encrustation and reconstructed with plaster, although only the left scapulocoracoid was significantly deformed.

A related animal, perhaps the same genus, was found in stratigraphic zones 2–4 of the Morrison Formation. Few theropod skeletons have been found, most discoveries being fragments.

Dinosaur footprints from the Niger Republic and from Beit Zayit were attributed to Elaphrosaurus. This assignment is considered inconclusive.

It also known from the Upper dinosaur member of the Tendaguru formation.

== Description ==
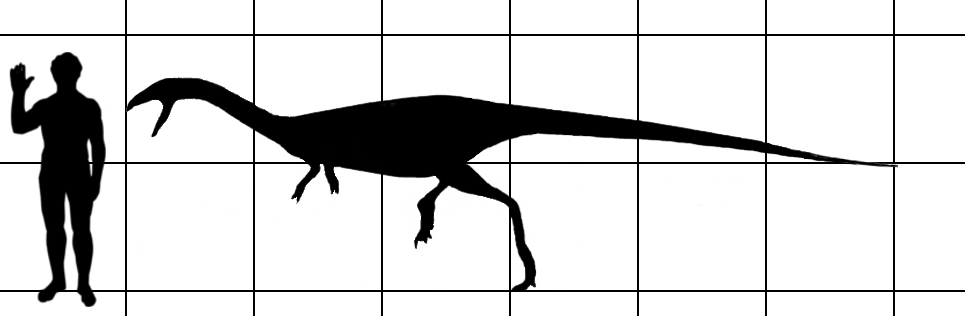
Size comparison of Elaphrosaurus with a human

Elaphrosaurus was long and slender, with a long neck. What is known about Elaphrosaurus mostly comes from a single nearly complete skeleton and no skull has been found. It was distinctive among theropods for being short-legged for its length. Paul (1988) noted that this was the longest-bodied and shallowest-chested theropod that he had examined. Elaphrosaurus was about 6–6.2 m (19.7–20.3 ft) long, 1.46 m (4.8 ft) tall at the hip, and weighed about 200–210 kg (440–460 lb). The tibia (shin bone) of Elaphrosaurus, measured 608 mm was considerably longer than its femur (thigh bone) that measured 520 mm, and the metatarsals were 74% the length of the femur. These proportions, also shared by some ornithomimosaurs, likely indicate cursorial habits. Its long tail ended with a rare downward bend which may be unrelated to taphonomy. Although the neck of Elaphrosaurus was long, the thin zygapophyses and a lack of epipophyses on the cervical vertebrae indicate that it was much less flexible than those of other theropods and that it may have only supported a rather small skull. These traits argue against Elaphrosaurus being a predator of large prey, and it was possibly omnivorous or herbivorous due to its close relation with Limusaurus.

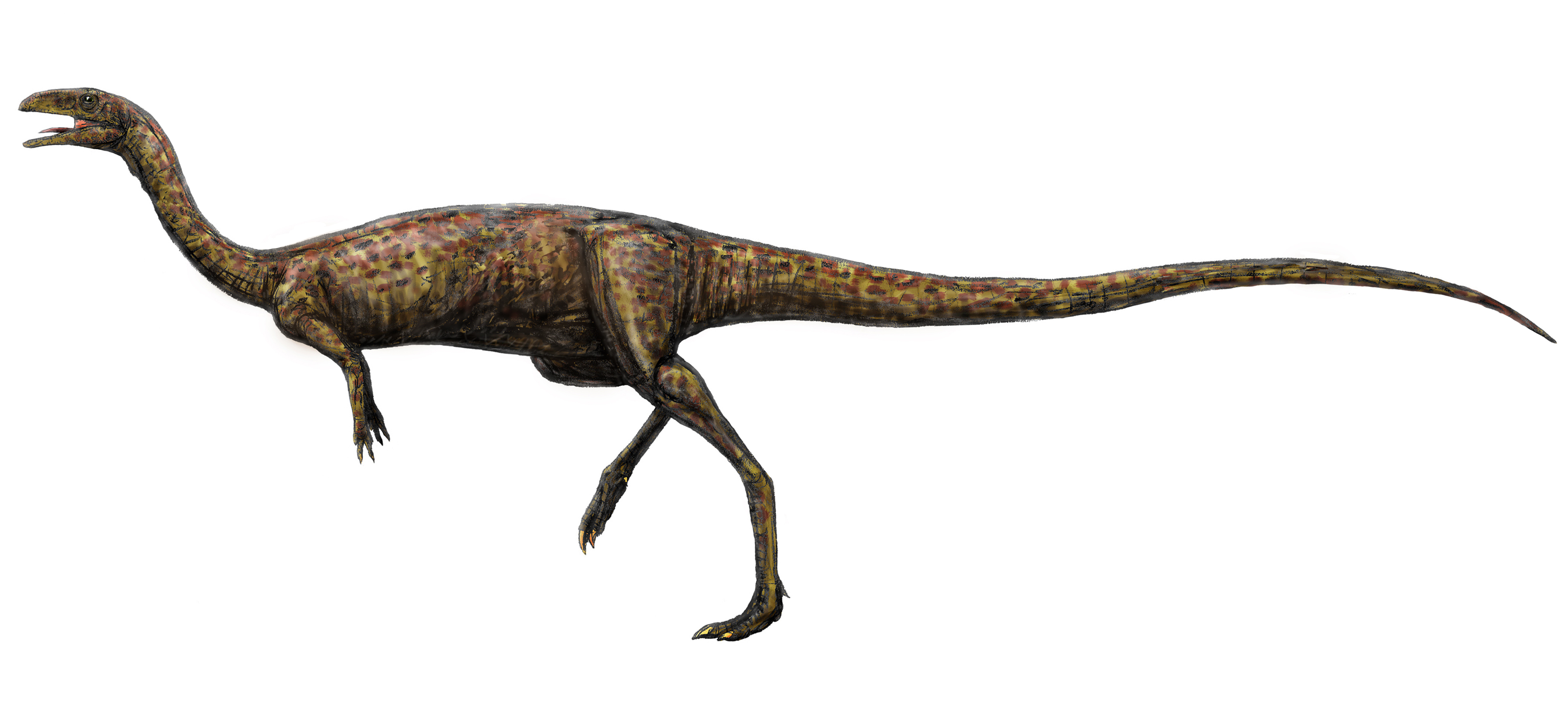
Restoration of Elaphrosaurus with head and hands based on the related Limusaurus

A diagnosis is a statement of the anatomical features of an organism (or group) that collectively distinguish it from all other organisms. Some, but not all, of the features in a diagnosis are also autapomorphies. An autapomorphy is a distinctive anatomical feature that is unique to a given organism. According to Rauhut (2000), Elaphrosaurus can be distinguished based on the following characteristics: the cervical vertebrae possess thin latero-ventral laminae, bordering the posterior pleurocoel ventrally, the cervical vertebrae are strongly concave ventrally, with the ventral margin arching above the mid-height of the anterior articular facet at its highest point, the brevis fossa of the ilium is extremely widened, so that the brevis shelf forms an almost horizontal lateral flange, the distal end of the ischium is strongly expanded into a triangular boot.

An emended diagnosis in Rauhut and Carrano's 2016 study added that Elaphrosaurus could uniquely be distinguished by pronounced ventrolateral laminae at the posterior ends of the cervical vertebrae, no cervical epipophyses (especially unique among abelisauroids), the distal end of metacarpal II offset ventrally from its shaft by a distinct step, the proximal end of metatarsal IV almost 2.5 times deeper anteroposteriorly than wide transversely, and a very short ascending process of the astragalus (if identified correctly).

== Classification ==
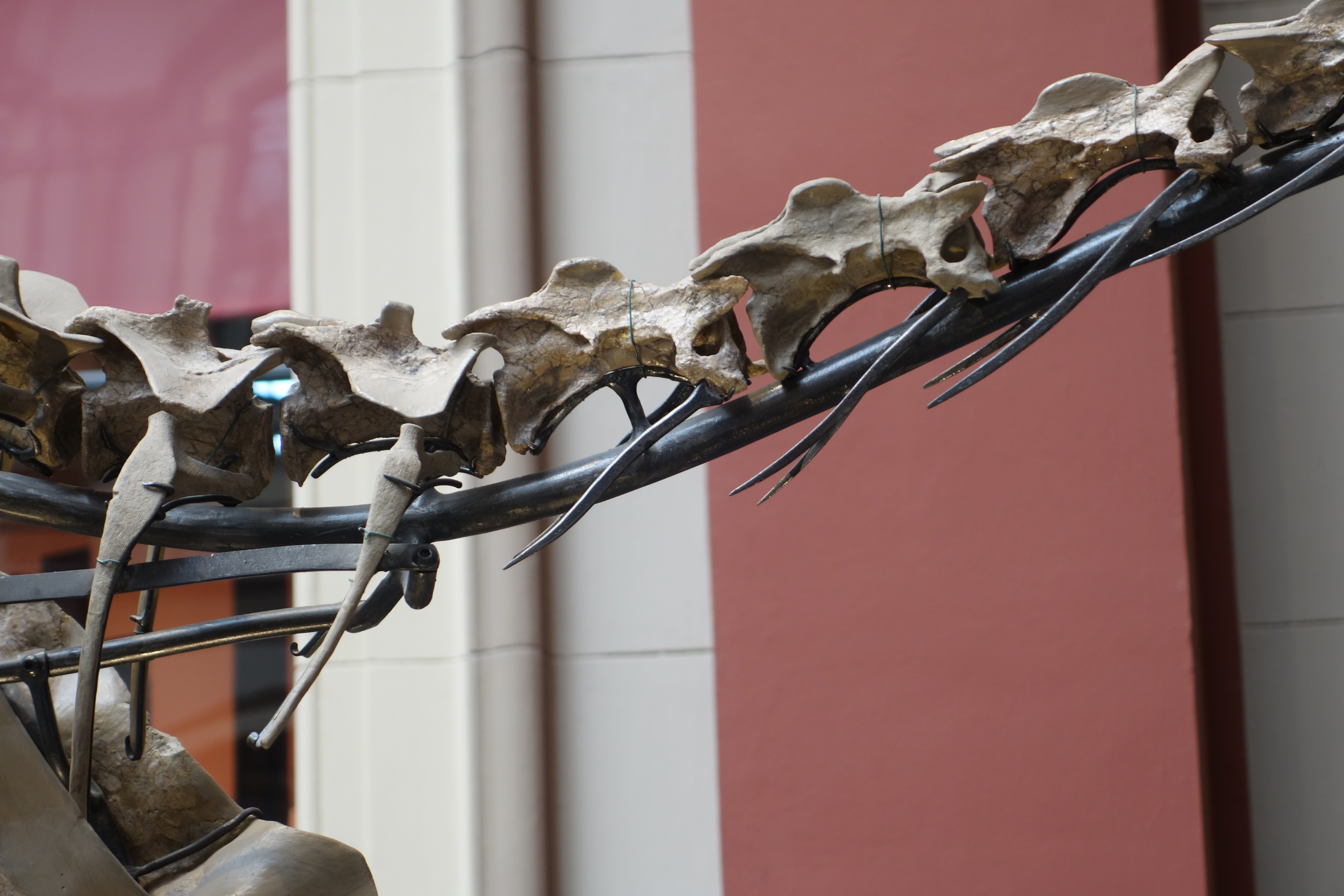
Cervical vertebrae of the holotype

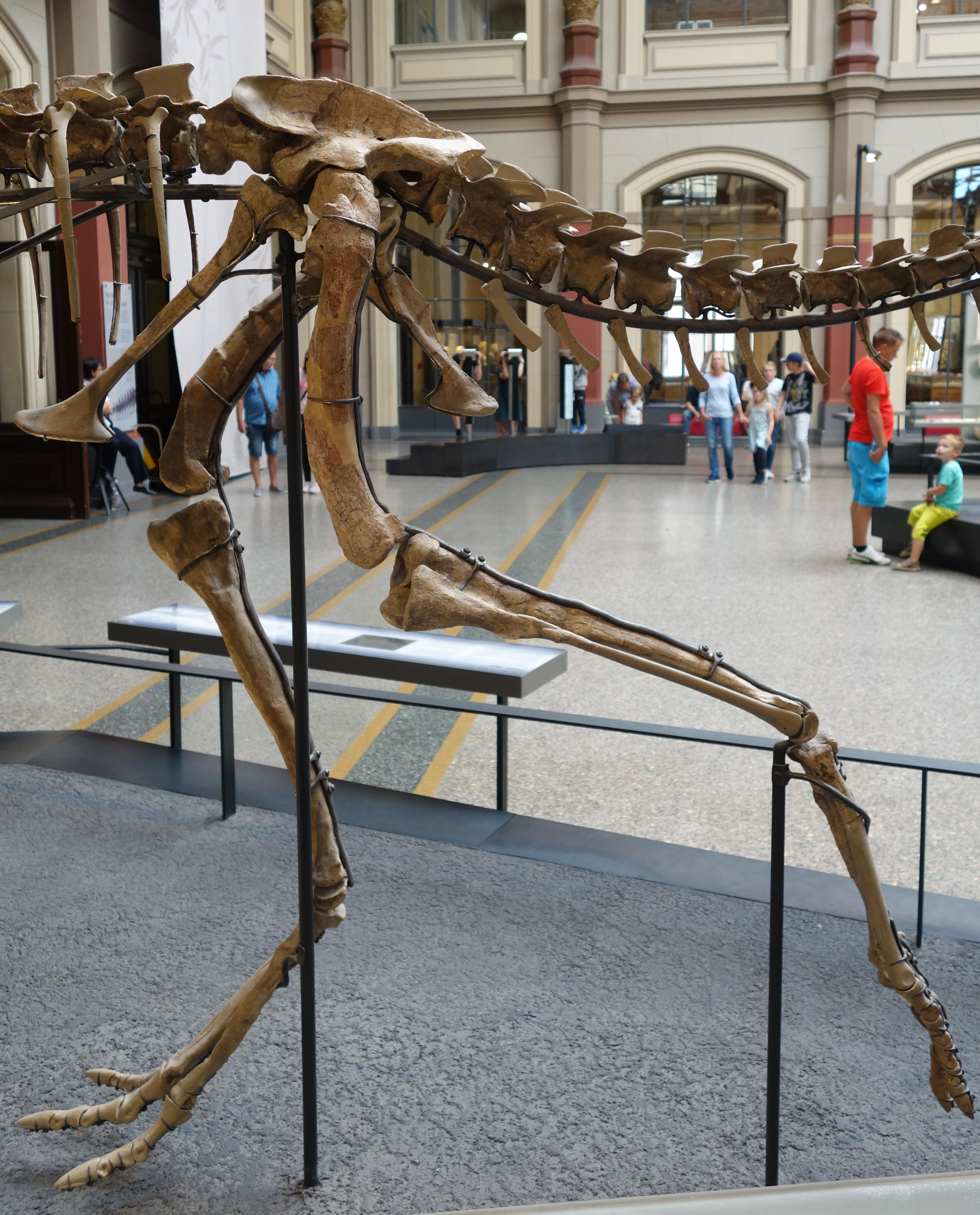
Hind limbs of the holotype

Elaphrosaurus was first described by Janensch as a coelurosaurian. At the time, Coelurosauria was a wastebasket taxon for small theropods. Then, Elaphrosaurus was placed in the family Ornithomimidae by Franz Nopcsa in 1928 because of its light frame and the fact that its humerus is straight and slender, with a low deltopectoral crest. Janensch himself rejected this assignment, believing any resemblances could plausibly be explained by convergent evolution. By the middle of the twentieth century, Elaphrosaurus was usually seen as a member of the Coeluridae. However, Nopcsa's hypothesis was revived by Dale Alan Russell in 1972, and confirmed by Peter Malcolm Galton in 1982. In 1988 Gregory S. Paul remarked that upon closer examination its limbs approximate those of Coelophysis and suggested a position in the Coelophysidae. Nevertheless, in 1990 Barsbold, Teresa Maryańska and Osmólska and other researchers still classified it as an ornithomimid. More recent work by Carrano and Sampson (2008) and Carrano et al. (2012) assign Elaphrosaurus to the Ceratosauria. A re-study of the known fossil material, published in 2016, concluded that, due to characteristics of the scapulocoracoid and metatarsals, Elaphrosaurus was actually an early member of the Noasauridae within Ceratosauria, and that it formed a distinct group with certain Asian noasaurids, which was named the Elaphrosaurinae.

The following cladogram is based on the phylogenetic analysis conducted by Rauhut and Carrano in 2016, showing the relationships of Elaphrosaurus among the noasaurids:

- Abelisauroidea
  - Abelisauridae
  - Noasauridae
    - Laevisuchus
    - Deltadromeus
    - - Elaphrosaurinae
        - Limusaurus
        - - CCG 20011
          - Elaphrosaurus
      - Noasaurinae
        - Velocisaurus
        - Noasaurus
        - Masiakasaurus

=== Formerly assigned species ===
The following material was assigned to Elaphrosaurus over the years, but further study revealed that these assignments were dubious:

- Elaphrosaurus iguidiensis, was described by Albert-Félix de Lapparent in 1960, and the material was collected in Algeria, Libya and Niger in Early Cretaceous sediments. The material consists of over forty teeth, a manual ungual, eight caudal vertebrae, a distal femur fragment, and a complete tibia measuring 350 mm. These specimens originated in three different localities and do not appear to belong to the same species.
- Elaphrosaurus gautieri, was first described by de Lapparent in 1960, and the material was collected at the Tiouraren Formation in Niger in Middle-Late Jurassic sediments. This material, a partial skeleton, has since been renamed Spinostropheus gautieri by Sereno et al. (2004).
- Elaphrosaurus philtippettensis, subsequently Elaphrosaurus philtippettorum, was erected by Stephan Pickering in 1995 based on USNM 5737, which consists of a tibia, a humerus, some metatarsals, and the distal portion of a fragmentary pubic bones recovered from the Morrison Formation of Colorado. Research by Carpenter et al. (2005) concluded that these fossils are not ceratosaurian and are likely referable to the coelurid theropod Tanycolagreus. It is named after visual effects supervisor Phil Tippett.
- Elaphrosaurus agilis, was a renaming by Dale Russell in 1980 of Coelurus agilis, originally named by Othniel Charles Marsh in 1884. The species is based on a pair of fused pubic bones that were by Marsh believed to represent a much larger version of the type species Coelurus fragilis. John Ostrom (1980) confirmed Charles Whitney Gilmore's earlier position that Coelurus agilis was synonymous with Coelurus fragilis. This means that Elaphrosaurus agilis is actually the same animal as Coelurus fragilis, its junior synonym.
- Elaphrosaurus sp. USNM 8415, was discovered in 1883 and first referred to the ornithopod Dryosaurus. It was later referred to Elaphrosaurus by Galton in 1982, based on remains recovered at the Morrison Formation of Colorado. This material, which is clearly ceratosaurian, does not bear any morphology that specifically ties it to Elaphrosaurus. Current knowledge limits the placement of this material to Ceratosauria incertae sedis.
- Elaphrosaurus sp. DMNH 36284, was referred to this genus by Chure in 2001, based on the proximal portion of a fragmentary right tibia from the Brushy Basin Member of the Morrison Formation. Phylogenetic analysis by Carrano and Sampson (2008) showed that it was not basal ceratosaurian, but instead resembled the leg bone of an abelisauroid theropod that has yet to be formally described.

== Paleobiology ==
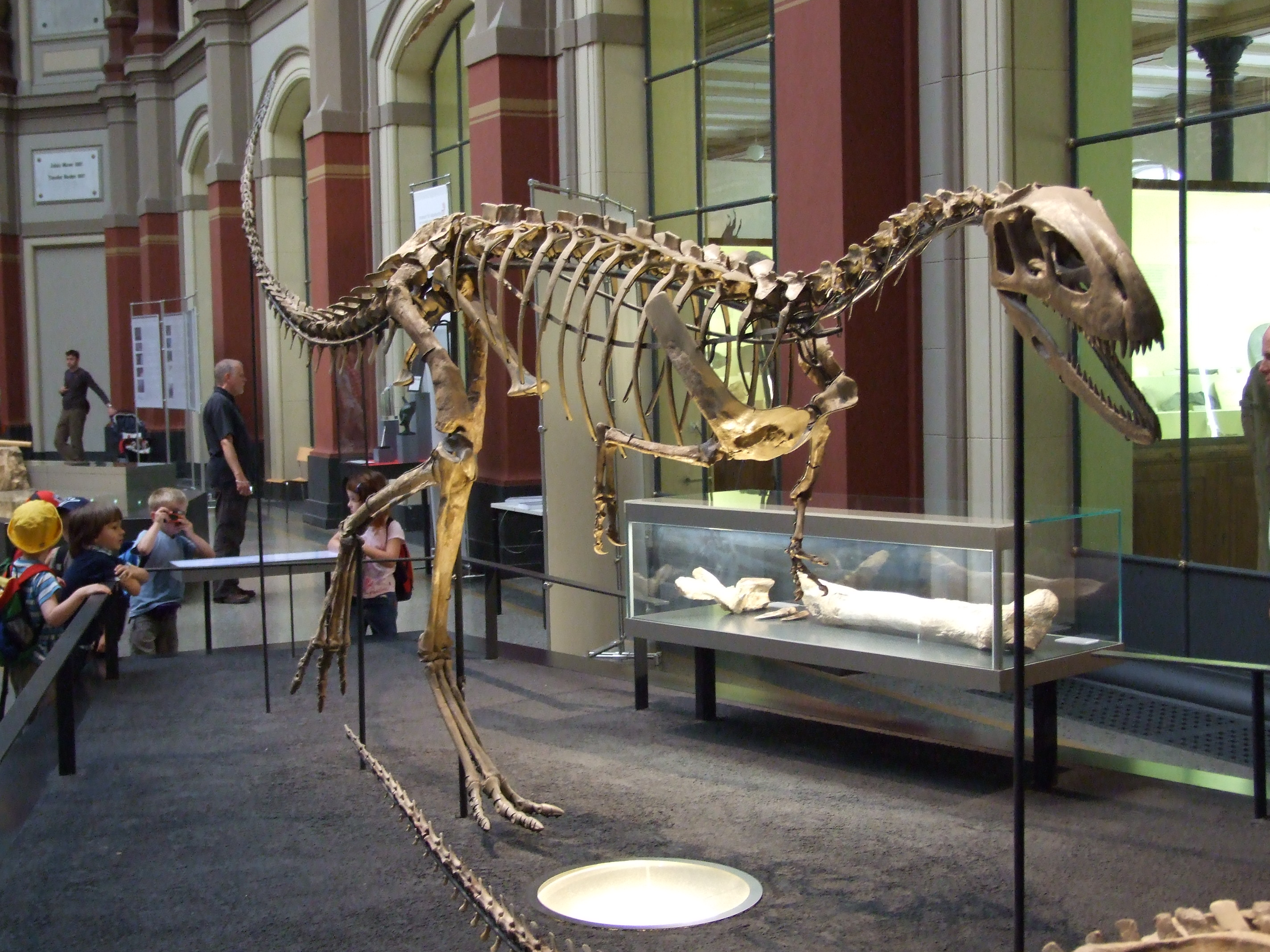
Holotype mount from the front

Paul (1988) noted that Elaphrosaurus bambergi was too small to prey on the sauropods and stegosaurs present in its paleoenvironment, and suggested instead that it likely hunted the small and swift ornithopod herbivores. However, newer studies support the idea that Elaphrosaurus was a herbivore or omnivore, owing to its close relation with Limusaurus and a neck which is much less flexible than those characteristic of carnivorous theropods.

== Paleoecology ==
Studies suggest that the paleoenvironment of the Tendaguru Formation was a marginal marine environment with both non-marine faunal and floral content. The Middle Dinosaur Member of the Tendaguru Formation has yielded the sauropods Giraffatitan, Australodocus, Janenschia, Tornieria and Dicraeosaurus, theropods similar to Allosaurus and Ceratosaurus, the carcharodontosaurid Veterupristisaurus, the stegosaurid Kentrosaurus and the iguanodontian Dysalotosaurus. Dinosaurs shared this paleoenvironment with pterosaurs like Pterodactylus and Rhamphorhynchus, as well as with early mammals.

== See also ==
- Timeline of ceratosaur research
