= Piejūra =

Nature park along the Gulf of Riga, Latvia

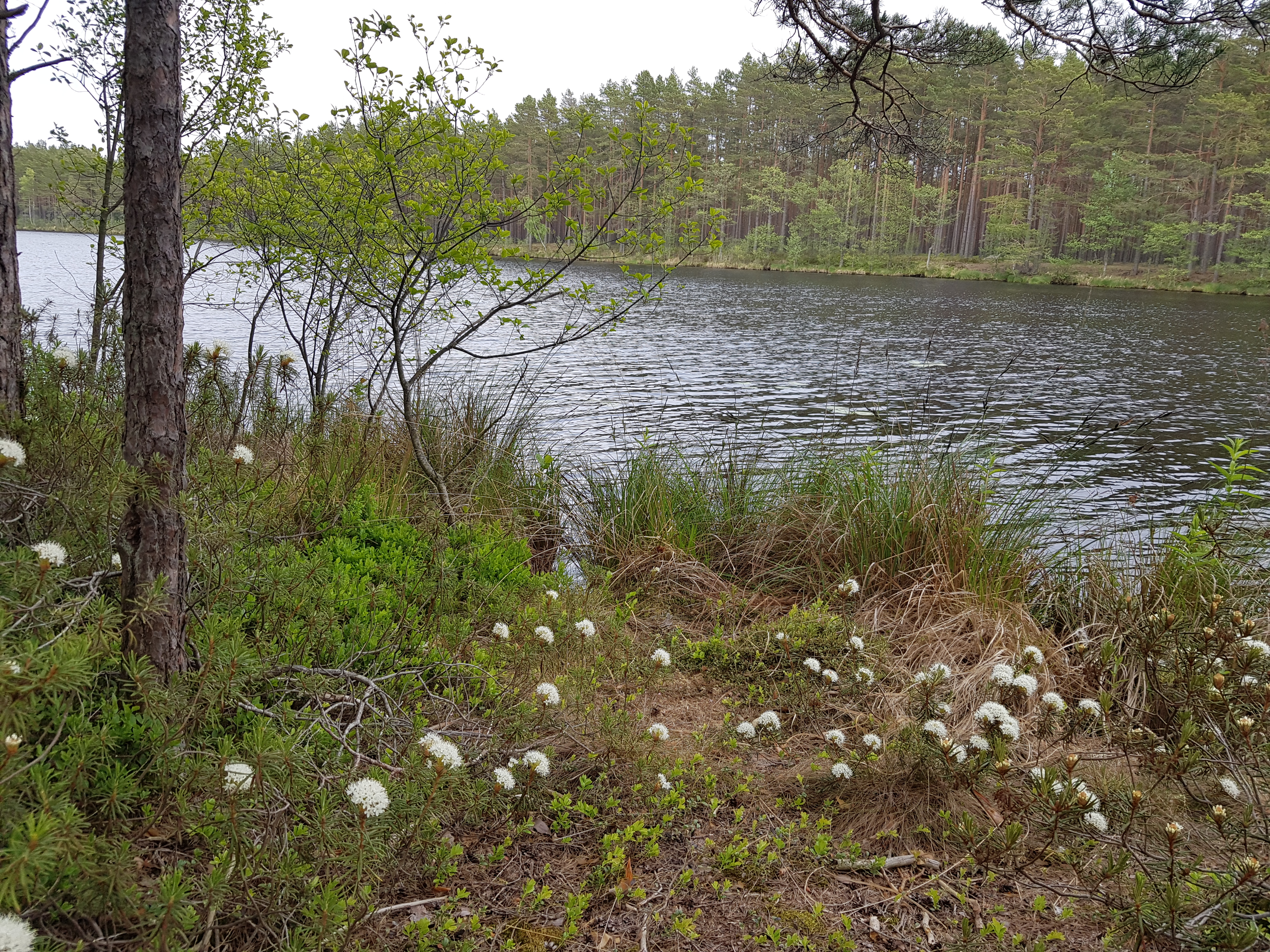
- Bank of Garezers lake
- Interactive map of Piejūra
- Location: Riga, Carnikava Municipality, and Saulkrasti Municipality, Latvia
- Coordinates: 57°07′15″N 24°13′52″E
- Area: 4,180 hectares (10,300 acres)
- Designation: Nature reserve, Natura 2000 (LV0301700)
- Created: 1964
- Operator: Pierīgas reģionālā administrācija

Dabas parks Piejūra (lit. 'Nature Park Piejūra' or 'Seaside') is a nature park along the Gulf of Riga in Latvia founded in 1962. It is a protected nature reserve and a Natura 2000 location. The park stretches 36.6 kilometres (22.7 mi) over an 4,180 hectares (10,300 acres) area from Riga, through Carnikava Municipality, and up to Saulkrasti. It is a popular seasonal recreation location, notably for beach access. The park is notable for its protected biotopes, particularly its dunes and boreal forests. The park's conservation plan for 2020 onwards was developed under the "LIFE CoHaBit" project.

== Location ==
The nature park is a protected area designated as a nature reserve in Latvia, as well as a Natura 2000 territory. It is the third oldest nature park in Latvia. The park was formed primarily for the preservation of biotopes. A concrete goal is to further the coexistence of oligotrophic to mesotrophic plants in mineral-starved mesotrophic lakes and their coasts.

The area of the park is 4,180 hectares (10,300 acres). The territory is located in Rīgavas līdzenums (Rigava plain) in lv:Piejūras zemiene (Seaside lowland) coastal zone. The park stretches 36.6 kilometres (22.7 mi) along the coast of the Gulf of Riga, with up to 2.8 kilometres (1.7 mi) wide areas and occupies 7% of coastal zone in Latvia. The territory spans from Vakarbuļļi village North-West of Riga, through Carnikava Municipality, and up to Inčupe river South-West of Saulkrasti The park borders the Lielupe and Daugava river estuaries and includes 1.6 kilometres (0.99 mi) of Gauja estuary.

The park is primarily owned by State (56%), municipalities (40%) and only 4% privately. There are few permanent residents in the area and most infrastructure is outside the area. The park is divided into 3 functional zones: nature reserve, nature park and neutral zones.

== Geology ==
The 40–50 metres (130–160 ft) to 80–100 metres (260–330 ft) thick terrain consists of sand, aleurites and clay deposits, primarily from Baltic Ice Lake, Littorina Sea and its lagoons as well as alluvial river and delta sediments. Most of the territory is covered with around 2 metres (6 ft 7 in) meter thick sand sediment with up to 10–25 metres (33–82 ft) in dune ridges. The majority of territory's height ranges between 3–7 metres (9.8–23.0 ft) with up to 20–28 metres (66–92 ft) in the dune ridges. The newer West side is only 0.5–1.5 metres (1 ft 8 in – 4 ft 11 in) high.

== Ecology ==
80% of the park's area are forests, 10% are beaches and dunes, while only 2% are human infrastructure. The park contains 24 identified EU biotopes that make up 84% of the territory. The most common biotopes are forested coastal dunes (2180), fixed coastal "gray" dunes with herbaceous vegetation (2130) and old boreal forests (9010). Other less common biotopes and those of conservation interest are embryonic shifting dunes (2110), foredunes (2120), forested coastal dunes and old boreal forests, Northern boreal alluvial meadows (6450), and boreal Baltic coastal meadows (1630).

Many rare plant and animal species are found here. Plant species are mainly determined based on the park's sand bedrock, high groundwater levels and poor natural drainage. Many rare vascular plant species are found here. The park is one of the most notable bird migration routes in Europe. Various water birds and songbirds can be found here, including sightings of Eurasian eagle-owls and Sea eagles.

=== Forests ===
Forests occupy 72% or 2,991.8 hectares (7,393 acres) area of the park, and have a high cultural and ecosystem regulation value. Forests vary between new growths and old forests depending on soil and forestry practices. 80% of the forests are dry pine forests formed in dune ridges and hills. In many locations, dense pine stands had been planted to stop the now-dormant shifting dunes. There haven't been significant changes in forest biotope areas in recent years, although some of the "gray" dunes have becomes forested coastal dunes. These forests are most influenced by recreational and tourist anthropogenic effects – foot traffic, garbage disposal, bad forestry practices.

There are six EU and Latvia protected forest biotopes and forested coastal dunes account for 93% of park's forests. Other forest biotopes occupy relatively small areas and are old boreal forests, deciduous swamp woods (9080), bog woodland (91D0), alluvial forests (91E0), and herb-rich forests (9050).

Natural and planted forested coastal dunes take up a 2,769 hectares (6,840 acres) area and vary between compact dune groups to wide dune arrays as well wide inter-dune depressions, and can overlap with old boreal forests. These primarily pine and rarer spruce forests are mostly dry, with poor mineral, nutrient and water circulation. In interdune depressions, there are some mixed wet forests with a mixture of birch, black alder and pines. Latvia is one of the few EU countries that still has natural forested coastal dunes, particularly without transformation. The estimated biotope habitat quality of forests range between poor to excellent, with potential for poorer areas to improve with proper maintenance. About 500 hectares (1,200 acres) are old pine stands that closest match natural forests, some reaching 250 year age. These location have the highest species variety and most favourable conditions, although newer regions are nevertheless an important habitat. Various rare and endangered species are found here, such as Pulsatilla pratensis, Dianthus arenarius, Epipactis atrorubens, Platanthera bifolia, Lycopodium annotinum, and Lycopodium clavatum.

Dry soil old boreal forest and herb-rich forest biotopes can be found in Garciems lagoon and house many rare species. Forest variety is further supplemented by bog woodland and deciduous swamp woods that can be found in inter-dune depressions with wet mineral-rich soil, while alluvial forests grow near rivers.

=== Dunes and beaches ===
Three EU protected dune biotopes are found here – embryonic shifting dunes, foredunes and "gray" dunes. The dunes found in the park are a high-valued recreation, tourism and sport resource year-round, especially due to being near Latvia's most-populated areas. They are also an effective erosion-regulating barrier against sea effects. Overall, dunes are susceptible to anthropogenic and natural "mechanical" damage, invasive species, and eutrophication.

Embryonic dunes that form from washed out sand and high winds are rarely found on Latvia's coastline and 18.1 hectares (45 acres) are located in the park. The area of foredunes has been decreasing over the years likely due to anthropogenic effects and recreational beach improvement works that prevent new foredune formation even though the geological conditions are otherwise favourable, namely along Vakarbuļļi, Daugravgrīva and Vecāķi beaches.

Foredunes are often found along the beach over 52.8 hectares (130 acres) area and are home to littoral and psammophytic plant species. Many of foredunes have transformed or been reclassified into "gray" dunes over time, so their absolute area has decreased. No new foredunes are forming between Lielupe and Daugava, while new ones are forming around Lilaste.

"Gray" dunes are commonly found in the park and cover 279.7 hectares (691 acres). These xerophytic dunes house a wude diversity of plant species and communities. It is the main habitat for rare plant species, such as Dianthus arenarius, Alyssum gmelinii, and Pulsatilla pratensis. The area classified as "gray" dunes has significantly increased over the years both from foredune conversion and more accurate classification, including the addition of open areas within the nearby forests. "Gray" dunes are also susceptible to overgrowing and becoming "brown" forested dunes.

There are two beach monitoring stations in the park – one in Daugavgrīva and one in Lilaste. In Daugavgrīva, embryonic dunes and "gray" dunes are only found in select areas, and new dunes do not form due to high human presence. In Lilaste, few embryonic dunes form due to human influence, however there is stable sand accumulation and foredune formation.

Among the EU and Latvia's protected biotopes are annual vegetation of drift lines (1210) and boreal Baltic sandy beaches with perennial vegetation (1640), both of which are very rare in Latvia and primarily located around The Gulf of Riga. The former is an important insect habitat and feeding grounds for waders. The rare biotope occupies 2.15 hectares (5.3 acres) near Lielupe estuary. The latter biotope is similarly very rare and takes up only 1.67 hectares (4.1 acres). Although the biotopes are small areas by themselves, they add a significant recreational value and well as protect against the coastal wave and wind influence. Their continued protection mainly depends on minimizing human influence and allowing natural geological processes to take place.

=== Lakes ===
There are seven natural lakes in the park (excluding oxbow lakes) – Ummis, Dienvidu Garezers, Vidējais Garezers, Ziemeļu Garezers, Dziļcaurums, Serģis, and Mazlandziņa. The first of the six formed 4000 to 6000 years ago from the receding sea and are the only example of such formation in Latvia. All lakes are 2–3.7 metres (6 ft 7 in – 12 ft 2 in) above sea level and are shallow ranging between 1–9 metres (3 ft 3 in – 29 ft 6 in) in depth. All lakes are located in Gauja river's drainage basin, although Ummis, Ziemeļu Garezers, Dziļcaurums and Mazlandziņa are drainless lakes and are only located in the basin geographically. Vidējais Garezers and Serģis are draining open lakes, while Dienvidu Garezers is through-flowing. All lakes have almost fully-natural slow drainage basins, mostly forested with some bog areas.

=== Bogs ===
There are a few small bogs and one larger bog in the park - a 55.6 hectares (137 acres) large Serģu purvs. All bogs are dominated by natural processes with little human influence. Serģu bog formed when the 26.3 hectares (65 acres) Serģa lake was drained via ditches dug in 1906, and these ditches remain today. By the 1940s, the lake had overgrown and there is only 0.4 hectares (0.99 acres) area of shallow (<1 metre (3 ft 3 in)) open water at present. Serģu bog is mostly wet and swampy, with some edges overgrown with trees and bushes. Most of the bog is covered with reeds and various transitional bog plants. Most of Serģu bog territory is of a Latvia's protected transition mire and quaking bog (7140) biotope, while the rest is active raised bog (7110). The bog's conditions are ill-suited for the growth of any protected species, although protected Hammarbya paludosa has been found. Around 8–9 hectares (20–22 acres) of still-living tree area is expected to become bogland within some decades, meanwhile serving as a habitat for various species dependant on dead trees. Other small bogs formed in depression between dunes and around areas of Garezers lakes where they have overgrown with plants forming transitional and raised bogs, or simply overgrown wet areas. Overall, the bogs are not suited for recreation and are of limited economic value, although their presence adds to the overall variety of the park. The bogs do however provide important water cycle and oxygen regulation, habitat for a variety of bog-exclusive species, and a natural barrier to invasive species and forest fires.

== Climate ==
The climate in the park is moderately warm and wet. There are lesser temperature fluctuations compared to the inland. The sea water accumulates warmth during summer and makes the autumn and winter warmer than inland. However, this also makes spring and summer cooler due to slower water warming. There are stronger winds in the park than inland, with coastal and sea breezes from interaction between water and land. The vegetation period is about 200 days, while the snow cover can remain up to 100 days a year.

== History ==
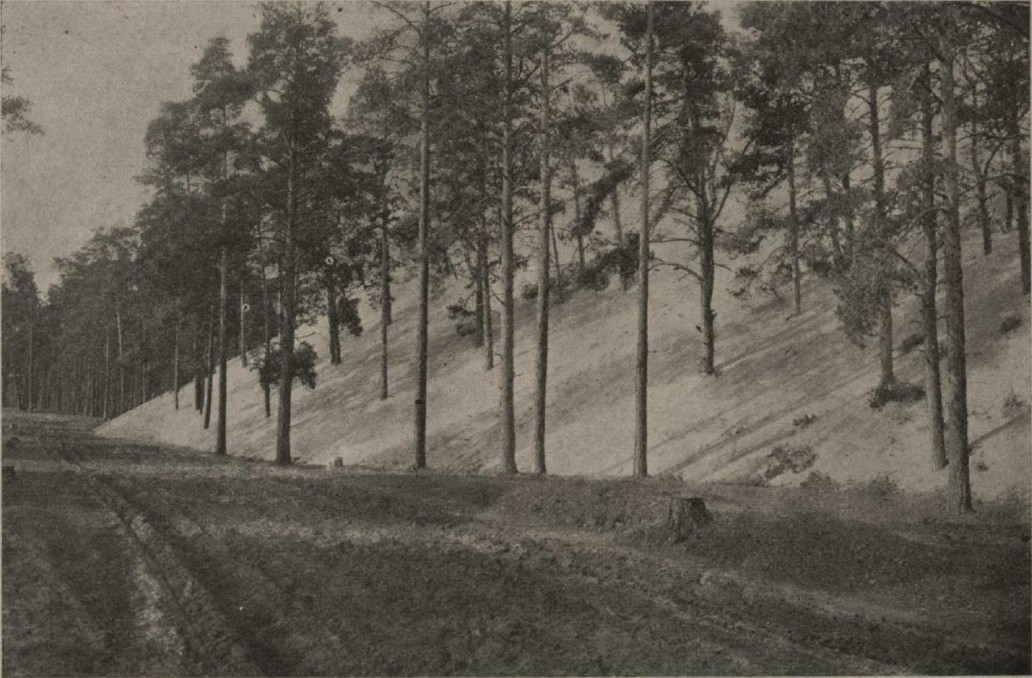
The shifting dune (Bākas Hill) burying the forest in Carnikava municipality

The main terrain of the park formed during the 5–7 thousand years during and after the Littorina Sea period. The new Western area only formed 300–400 years due to construction of dams and piers around Daugava delta.

Between 19th and 20th century, the area between Lielupe estuary and Pabaži used to have a 2,200 hectares (5,400 acres) area with sand and dune fields, either naked or with shallow scrub overgrowth. Due to long-term effects of wind, this sand become shifting dune ridges that slowly "travelled" over 200 years, burying old forests, waterways and damaging infrastructure. In the 1870s, about 200 hectares (490 acres) area was buried around Riga between Daugava and Lielupe estuaries. The lack of drainage caused the meadows to become swampy and required expensive canal construction for water drainage. In the 1930s, Piejura area had about 1,000 hectares (2,500 acres) of unsecured flowing sand with some ridges like Bākas hill moving and burying forest 1.85 metres (6 ft 1 in) per year. To stop the shifting sands, forestation works were carried out first covering the sand with branches and planting scrub and bushes to stop the sand movement and later planting trees to secure the area long-term. Towards the end of the 20th century, the sand movement had stopped.

The park itself was officially founded as a nature park in 1962. Latvian SSR Council of Ministers made the decision to create the park along the over 1,500 hectares (3,700 acres) territory between Vecāķi and Carnikava, between the coast and railroad, although, no immediate work took place in the following years. The nature park was established to protect the forested coastal dune and foredune biotopes, as well as the beach. The territory originally covered 1,629 hectares (4,030 acres) from Vecāķi neighbourhood to Gauja river estuary. Various border adjustments were made since then. By the end of the 20th century, the improvement project remained mostly on paper and only minimal amenities were available.

In 1999 the park was expanded to its current area by including areas to be conserved from Vakarbuļļi to Inčupe. In 2002, the park was added to Natura 2000 as type C for preservation of especially protected species and biotopes. In 2004, the "LIFE Piekraste" project established the park's maintenance guidelines until 2015, later extended to 2019. Since 2006, the protection and usage of the park are codified in law. Between 1 September 2016 and 31 August 2020, the "LIFE CoHaBit" project surveyed and analysed the territory and formed a plan for protection, management and development of the park for 2020 onwards. The project cost €970 thousand, of which €582 thousand was financed by the EU.

== Tourism ==
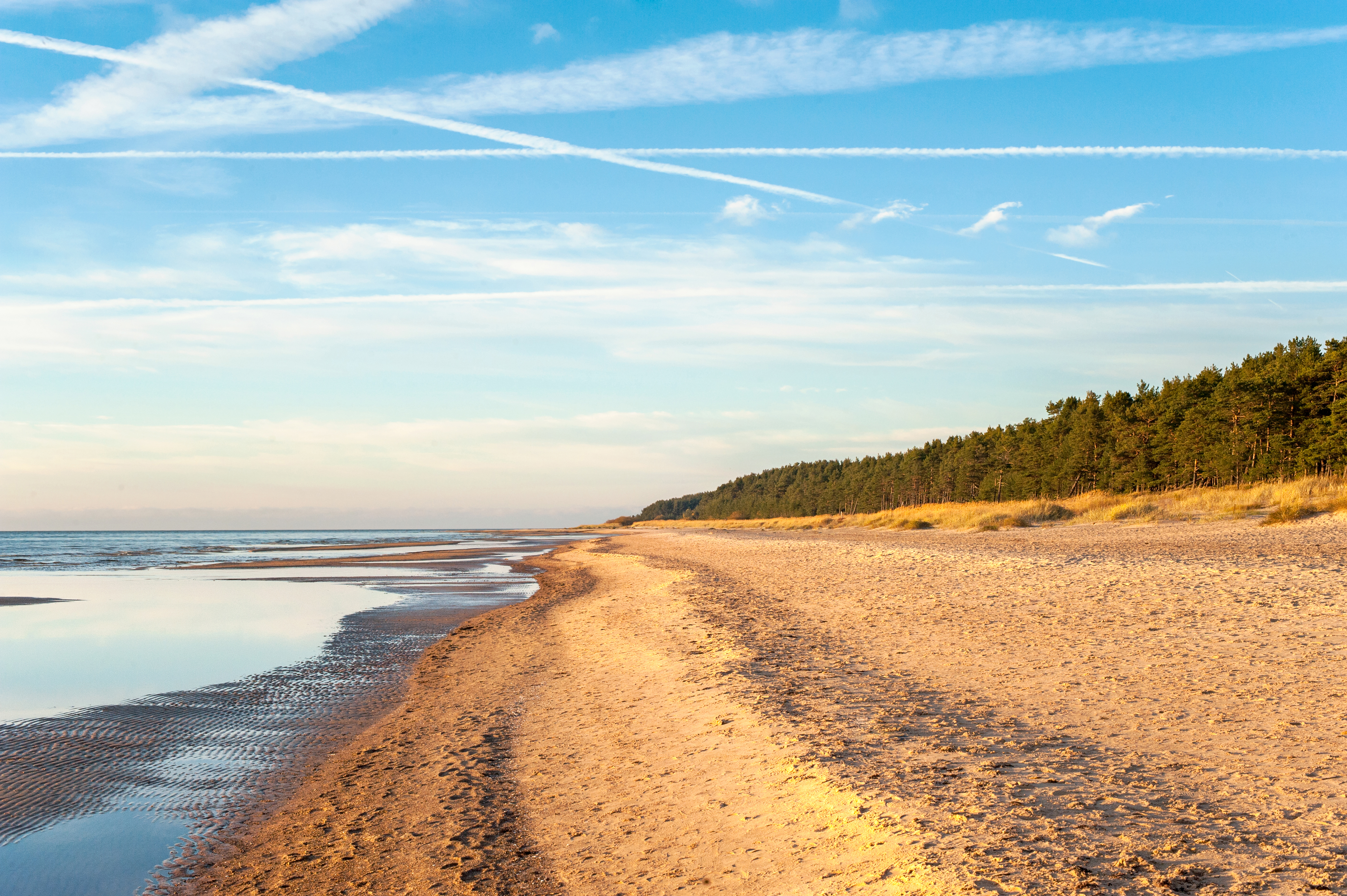
Beach along the boreal forest near Saulkrasti

The park is a popular tourism recreational location. Although the park is regularly visited by nearby residents, larger visitation from Riga and near-Riga is irregular and seasonal. Summer season attracts most visitors, especially for beach visits. Weekend visitation is much higher than during work days. Recreational activity is also very different between park locations. For example, beach visitation is concentrated in locations with easier access and near-beach infrastructure. According to a survey of park visitors, most arrive by foot (37%), car (36%) or bike (14%). The primary purposes are for swimming, sunbathing, hiking and other recreation.

Most anthropogenic effects on the park are from its visitors. Over the years, the park has had problems with people littering and dumping garbage, including "green trash" and composts that propagate invasive species. People also commonly swim in the Ummis lake, one of Latvia's cleanest lake where swimming if forbidden during summer, while information signs are commonly vandalized. Motorized vehicles are often illegally parked in the park, and the lack of car and pedestrian access, as well as designated parking space damages the park.

== Protection plan ==
The 2004 plan was replaced with the plan formed as part of the project "LIFE CoHaBit – Piekrastes biotopu aizsardzība dabas parkā "Piejūra"" (transl. Coastal biotope protection in nature park Piejura). The project was funded by EU's The LIFE Programme and The State Regional Development Agency. The new territory protection plan was developed by Ministry of Environmental Protection and Regional Development. The plan is set to last until 2031.

One of the primary goals of the plan is reduction of anthropogenic impact. The plan raises special attention to protection of plant species and reduction of lake eutrophication. It also calls attention to development of tourism infrastructure and availability of information, as well as reduction of dune damage due to visitors. The plan also asks to further divide the park into functional zones: regulated regime, nature reserve, nature park and neutral zones.

By mid-2021, a restoration and maintenance project for the coastal biotopes was completed over 230 hectares (570 acres) of biotope territory, bringing positive impact on at least 960 hectares (2,400 acres) of territory (about a fourth of the park). The major completed tasks included: foredune fortification against erosion, reduction of meadow reeds and increase in other plant variety and bird nesting, selective clearing of pines to further forest quality and other species growth, dune restoration increasing dune bird habitats, limiting of invasive species, and construction of infrastructure for reduction of anthropogenic effects by guiding visitor flow and providing information. Further goals were set for the next 12 years.

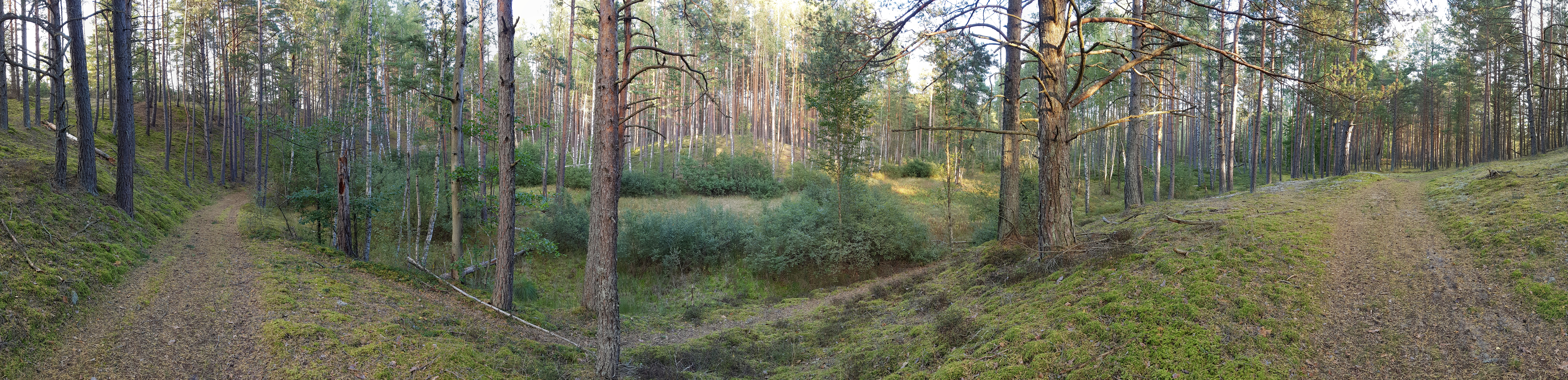
Boreal forest hills in Saulkrasti Municipality
