= Brachypodosaurus =

Brachypodosaurus Temporal range: Late Cretaceous, 66 Ma

Scientific classification
- Kingdom: Animalia
- Phylum: Chordata
- Class: Reptilia
- Clade: Dinosauria
- Clade: †Ornithischia (?)
- Genus: †Brachypodosaurus; Chakravarti, 1934
- Species: †B. gravis

Binomial name
- †Brachypodosaurus gravis Chakravarti, 1934

Extinct genus of dinosaurs

Brachypodosaurus (meaning "short-footed lizard") is a dubious genus of dinosaur, possibly an ornithischian, from the Late Cretaceous Lameta Formation (Maastrichtian) in India.

== History and validity ==
Brachypodosaurus type locality in Chota Simla hill, Jabalpur

As of 1934, there was very little evidence of ornithischian dinosaurs from India, with the only named taxon being the supposed stegosaur Lametasaurus named in 1924 from the Lameta Formation of Bara Simla Hill near Jabalpur. However, discussions of its classification by Indian paleontologist Dhirendra Kishore Chakravarti showed that it was not a stegosaur or an ornithischian. It was actually shown to be a chimera of theropod bones.

This left the only possible ornithischian from India as a fossil found by Chakravarti at Chota Simla Hill nearby. This fossil was also found in the Lameta Formation, but was 50–60 ft (15–18 m) above the beds where Lametasaurus was found, and was identified and described by Chakravarti in 1934 as the humerus of the new taxon Brachypodosaurus gravis. The genus name was derived from Greek βραχύς, brachys, "short", and πούς, pous, "foot", while the specific name gravis means "heavy" in Latin. Chakravarti considered Brachypodosaurus to be an armored dinosaur, considered a member of Stegosauria at the time. The holotype is IM V9.

== Classification ==
Chakravarti based his identification of the element as a humerus on the presence of a large crest on the shaft, which he took for the deltopectoral crest. The status as a (dinosaurian) humerus is problematic. The bone is flat, has a crest on the other side of the shaft also, is not twisted around its longitudinal axis, is strongly constricted above and below the crests and lacks a clear caput or condyles. In any case, it lacks stegosaurian synapomorphies. On the assumption it might at least be some member of the Thyreophora, it has been considered a possible ankylosaurian, the ankylosaurs being a sister group of the Stegosauria that survived into the Late Cretaceous. Even then, however, it was considered a nomen dubium as so few remains of the animal have been found. In 2004, Matthew Lamanna e.a. considered it unlikely that any Ornithischia were present in the Maastrichtian of India. The other Late Cretaceous genus from India originally described as a stegosaur, Dravidosaurus, is also of dubious validity, potentially based on plesiosaurian remains.
