= Dushihin Formation =

Early Cretaceous geologic formation in Mongolia

- Stratigraphic range: Aptian; 125–113 Ma
- Type: Geological formation

Lithology
- Primary: Claystone, conglomerate

Location
- Coordinates: 45.4°N 101.7°E
- Approximate paleocoordinates: 46.5°N 101.7°E
- Region: Övörkhangai Province
- Country: Mongolia
- Dushihin Formation (Mongolia)

The Dushihin Formation is an Early Cretaceous (Aptian) geologic formation in the Övörkhangai Province of Mongolia. The formation preserves fossils of Psittacosaurus mongoliensis and fossil eggs described as Trachoolithus faticanus.

== Description ==
The formation comprises concretionary, calcareous claystones and concretionary, brown, gray, green, blue, calcareous claystones with large flattened lime concretions. Within 3 metres (9.8 ft) in the formation is a lens of lighter grayish-brown clay with green and blue spots and small lime concretions. In the lens is also an inclusion of blue, pale purple-spotted aleurite. The depositional environment has been interpreted as lacustrine.

== Fossil content ==
The following fossils were reported from the lacustrine claystones and conglomerates of the formation:

- Dinosaurs
  - Psittacosaurus mongoliensis
  - Sauropoda indet.
  - Theropoda indet.
- Fossil eggs
  - Trachoolithus faticanus
  - Elongatoolithidae indet.
  - Spheroolithidae indet.
- Squamata
  - Paramacellodidae indet.

== See also ==
- List of dinosaur-bearing rock formations
  - List of stratigraphic units with dinosaur eggs
- Andaikhudag Formation
- Khuren Dukh Formation
- Tsagaantsav Formation
