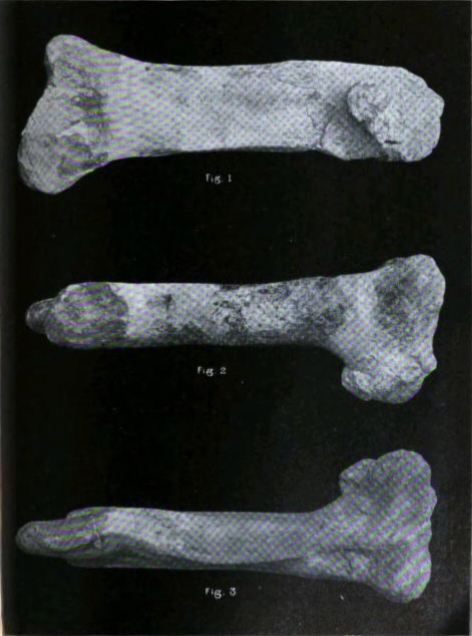
- Left tibia of L. indicus in 1) anterior, 2) right lateral and 3) left lateral views.

Scientific classification
- Kingdom: Animalia
- Phylum: Chordata
- Class: Reptilia
- Clade: Dinosauria
- Genus: †Lametasaurus; Matley, 1923

Type species
- †Lametasaurus indicus Matley, 1923

= Lametasaurus =

Lametasaurus Temporal range: Late Cretaceous, 70 Ma

Extinct genus of reptiles

Lametasaurus (lə-MAY-tə-SOR-us; lit. 'Lameta lizard'), is a chimeric genus of dinosaur known from the Lameta Formation of Jabalpur, India. The type species is L. indicus.

== History of discovery ==
Between October 1917 and 1919 Charles Alfred Matley excavated fossils near Jabalpur. In 1921 he reported the find in the "Carnosaur Bed" of what he considered to be two theropod dinosaurs. In 1923, he named one of these as the type species Lametasaurus indicus. The type specimen consisted of a number of dermal scutes, a sacrum of at least five sacral vertebrae (61 centimetres (24 in) in length), a pair of ilium (left ilium is 96 centimetres (38 in) in length with the acetabular portion, including the pubic and ischial processes, being about 37 centimetres (15 in) long and 18 centimetres (7.1 in) wide), a tibia (58 centimetres (1.90 ft) cm long with the distal breadth being 23.3 centimetres (9.2 in)) and teeth. In 1933 Matley and Friedrich von Huene described some more remains collected by Barnum Brown, thought to have been part of a tail club; later this was shown to be a large osteoderm.

In 1964, Alick Walker chose the scutes as the lectotype, thus removing the teeth and the bones from the type material.

The type material has been lost, lacking a known inventory number, making it difficult to test the several hypotheses. The taxon is today commonly seen as a nomen dubium.

== Description ==
The weight estimate of Lametasaurus, on the basis of the robust tibia, is 3,600 kg (7,900 lb), similar morphology can be seen in the tibia of Pycnonemosaurus, which indicates similar weight estimates.

== Classification ==
In 1921, the specimen was described within Megalosauria, while by 1923, Matley no longer identified it as a theropod but as a member of the Stegosauria instead, which concept at the time also included the armoured dinosaurs today assigned to the Ankylosauria; at first Matley had seen it as a stegosaurian in the modern sense and even intended to name it as a species of Omosaurus. In 1935, Dhirendra Kishore Chakravarti contested the interpretation as an armoured dinosaur. He claimed that the specimen was a chimera including titanosaurid armor, crocodile teeth and theropod hindlimb material.

By 1964, the name Lametasaurus designated the scutes only and was generally considered to represent a member of the Nodosauridae. The pelvis and hindlimb bones have in 2003 been suggested to belong to Rajasaurus, based on shared features in the ilium. In 2008, Matthew Carrano e.a. discarded the possibility the scutes were ankylosaurian, stating they were probably titanosaurian, but noted that a comparison to the osteoderms of Ceratosaurus would help in determining its affinities. If in which case the species were to be found ceratosaurian, it would possibly be a senior synonym of Indosaurus and/or Rajasaurus. Most recently, it has been suggested that some of the osteoderms assigned to Lametasaurus show ankylosaurian synapomorphies, which renders Lametasaurus a chimera regardless of the affinities of the other material.
