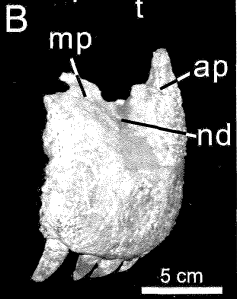
- Right premaxilla questionably assigned to I. raptorius (specimen AMNH 1753)

Scientific classification
- Kingdom: Animalia
- Phylum: Chordata
- Class: Reptilia
- Clade: Dinosauria
- Clade: Saurischia
- Clade: Theropoda
- Family: †Abelisauridae
- Genus: †Indosuchus; Huene, 1932
- Species: †I. raptorius

Binomial name
- †Indosuchus raptorius Huene, 1932

= Indosuchus =

Indosuchus Temporal range: Late Cretaceous, 70–66 Ma

Abelisaurid theropod dinosaur genus from the Late Cretaceous Period

Indosuchus (lit. 'Indian crocodile') is an extinct genus of abelisaurid theropod from the Late Cretaceous of India, approximately 70–66 million years ago, during the Maastrichtian age. Like other theropods, it was a bipedal carnivore. It measured approximately 7 m (23 ft) in length and weighed and estimated 1.2 tonnes (1.3 short tons). Its skull was flattened across the top and bore a prominent crest.

== Discovery and naming ==
Indosuchus was named by Friedrich von Huene in 1932 and formally described by Huene and Charles Alfred Matley in 1933. The description was based on three partial skulls discovered by Matley near Jabalpur, in Madhya Pradesh within the Lameta Formation. The lectotype, specimen GSI K27/685, consists of the parietal and frontal bones of a single individual. Two additional specimens were designated as paralectotypes, both preserving parts of the posterior skull and assigned to the genus on the basis of their parietal morphology. The known remains of the lectotype have since been lost.

Indosuchus type locality in Carnosaur beds, Bara Simla, Jabalpur, Madhya Pradesh, India

The generic name Indosuchus combines Indos, the Ancient Greek name for the Indus River, and Soukhos, the Greek name for the Egyptian crocodile god Sobek. The specific name raptorius is derived from Latin and means "raptorial".

== Classification ==
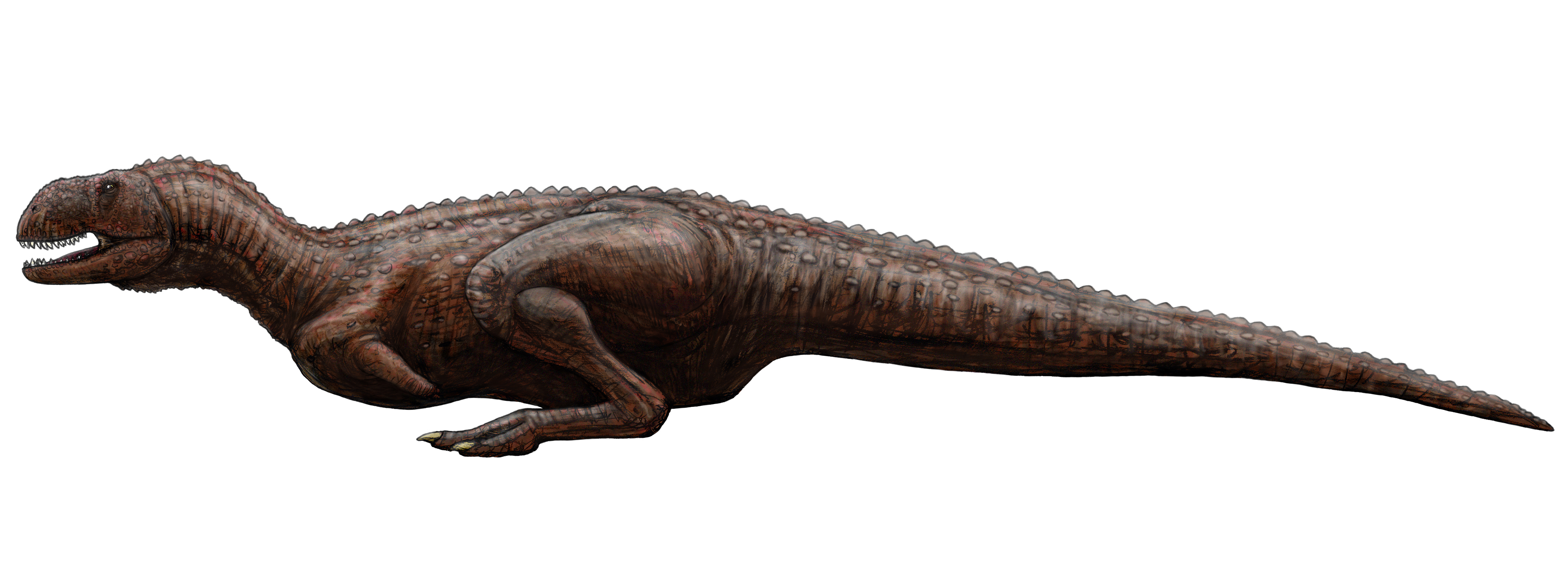
Life restoration in resting pose

Because only some skull elements have been found, Indosuchus placement has been somewhat erratic. Although it is now somewhat firmly placed within the Abelisauridae, it was originally assigned by von Huene to the Allosauridae. Alick Walker thought in 1964 it was a member of the Tyrannosauridae. The discovery of other abelisaurids like Carnotaurus has helped clarify its position; in 1986 José Bonaparte concluded it was an abelisaurid.

Indosuchus is defined based on how the frontonasal suture is placed anteriorly compared to lacrimal, according to Novas et al., 2004.

== See also ==
- Timeline of ceratosaur research
