= Trachoolithus =

Trachoolithus Temporal range: Aptian-Maastrichtian ~120–66 Ma

Egg fossil classification
- Basic shell type: Ornithoid
- Morphotype: Ornithoid-ratite
- Oofamily: †Elongatoolithidae
- Oogenus: †Trachoolithus; Mikhailov, 1994

Oospecies
- T. faticanus

Dinosaur egg

Trachoolithus is an oogenus of dinosaur egg. It only contains the oospecies T. faticanus, found in the Lameta Formation of India and the Dushihin Formation of Mongolia.

== See also ==
- List of dinosaur oogenera
