= Lameta Formation =

Geologic formation in India

- Stratigraphic range: Maastrichtian; ~70–66 Ma
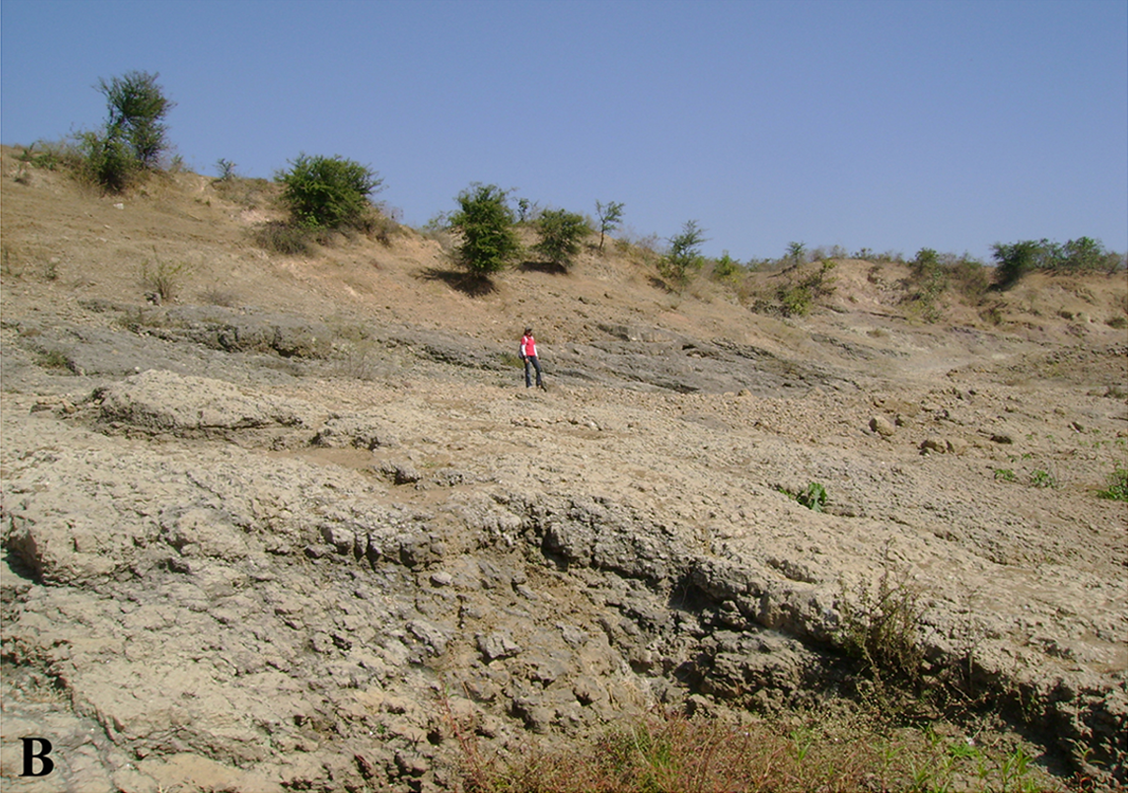
- Exposure of the Lameta Formation at its type locality of Lameta
- Type: Geological formation
- Underlies: Intertrappean Beds, Deccan Traps deposits
- Overlies: Jabalpur Group or Precambrian Basement
- Area: 5,000 km^{2} (1,900 sq mi)
- Thickness: Variable, typically 18–45 m (59–148 ft)

Lithology
- Primary: Claystone, sandstone limestone
- Other: Conglomerate

Location
- Coordinates: 23.2°N 80.0°E
- Approximate paleocoordinates: 24.7°S 63.2°E
- Region: Western India
- Country: India
- Extent: Madhya Pradesh, Gujarat, Maharashtra, Andhra Pradesh, Telangana

Type section
- Named for: Lameta Ghat
- Lameta Formation (India)

The Lameta Formation, also known as the Infratrappean Beds (not to be confused with the contemporaneous Intertrappean Beds), is a sedimentary geological formation found in Madhya Pradesh, Gujarat, Maharashtra, Telangana, and Andhra Pradesh, India, associated with the Deccan Traps. It is of the Maastrichtian age (Late Cretaceous), and is notable for its dinosaur fossils.

== History ==
The first fossils found in the Lameta Formation were discovered between 1917 and 1919.

The Lameta Formation was first identified in 1981 by geologists working for the Geological Survey of India (GSI), G. N. Dwivedi and Dhananjay Mahendrakumar Mohabey, after being given limestone structures–later recognised as dinosaur eggs–by workers of the ACC Cement Quarry in the village of Rahioli near the city Balasinor in the Gujarat state of western India.

== Lithology ==
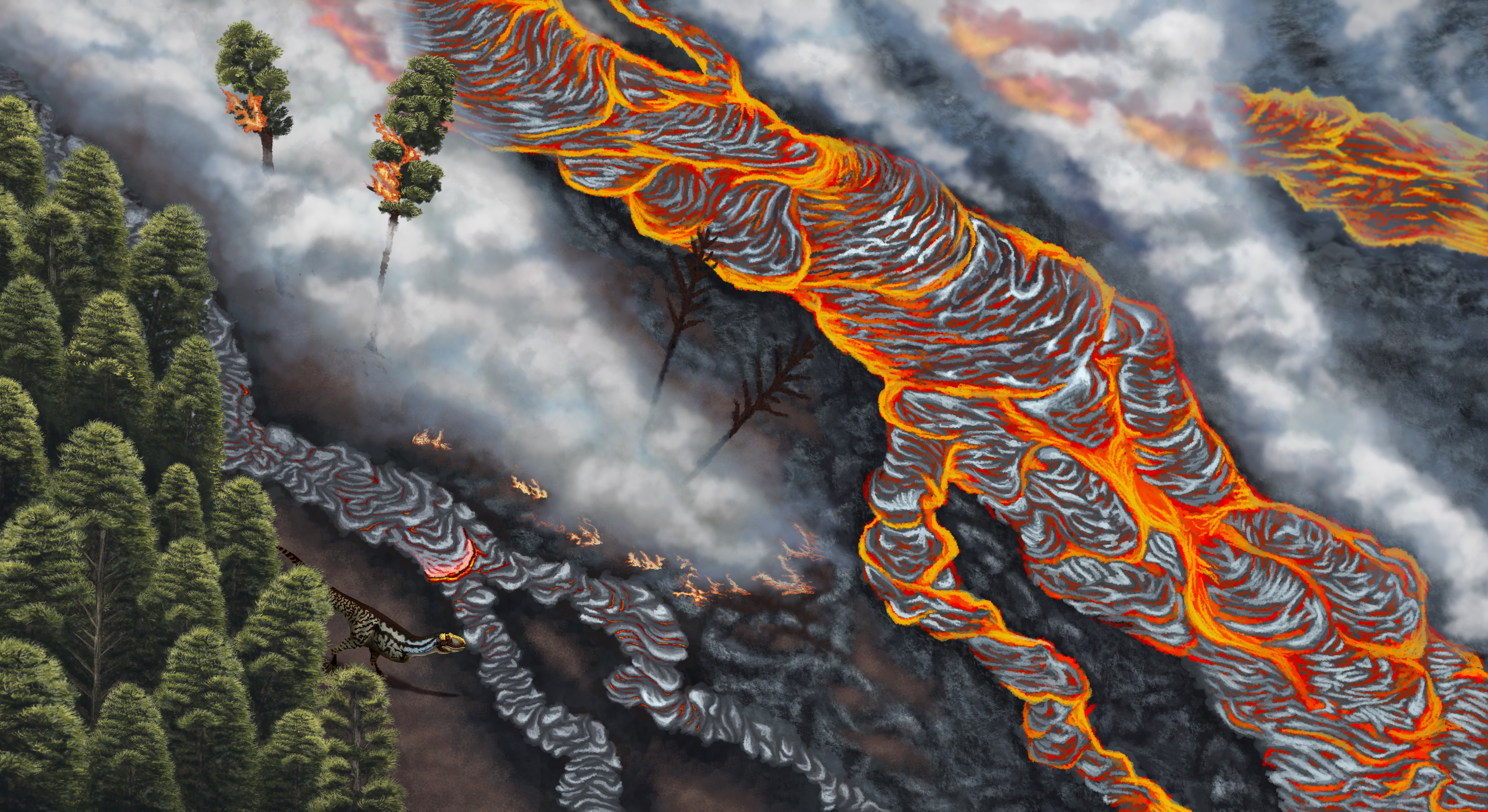
Paleoart of the Deccan trap illustrating the paleoenvironment of Lameta formation

The formation is underlain by the Lower Cretaceous sedimentary "Upper Gondwana Sequence" also known as the Jabalpur Formation, and is overlain by the Deccan Traps basalt. The Lameta Formation is only exposed at the surface as small isolated outcrops associated with the Satpura Fault. The lithology of the formation, depending on the outcrop, consists of alternating clay, siltstone and sandstone facies, deposited in fluvial and lacustrine conditions. The environment at the time of deposition has alternatively been considered semi-arid, or tropical humid.

== Fossil content ==
Many dubious names have been created for isolated bones, but several genera of dinosaurs from these rocks are well-supported, including the titanosaur sauropods Isisaurus and Jainosaurus and the Abelisaurs Indosaurus, Indosuchus, and Rajasaurus and the Noasaurids Laevisuchus and ‘’Jubbulpuria’’. Synapsids are also known form the formation, such as the possibly late surviving Avashishta, possibly the last known non- mammalian synapsid the possibly youngest known stegosaurian ichnogenus Deltapodus, madtsoiid snakes and other fossils.

=== Dinosaurs ===
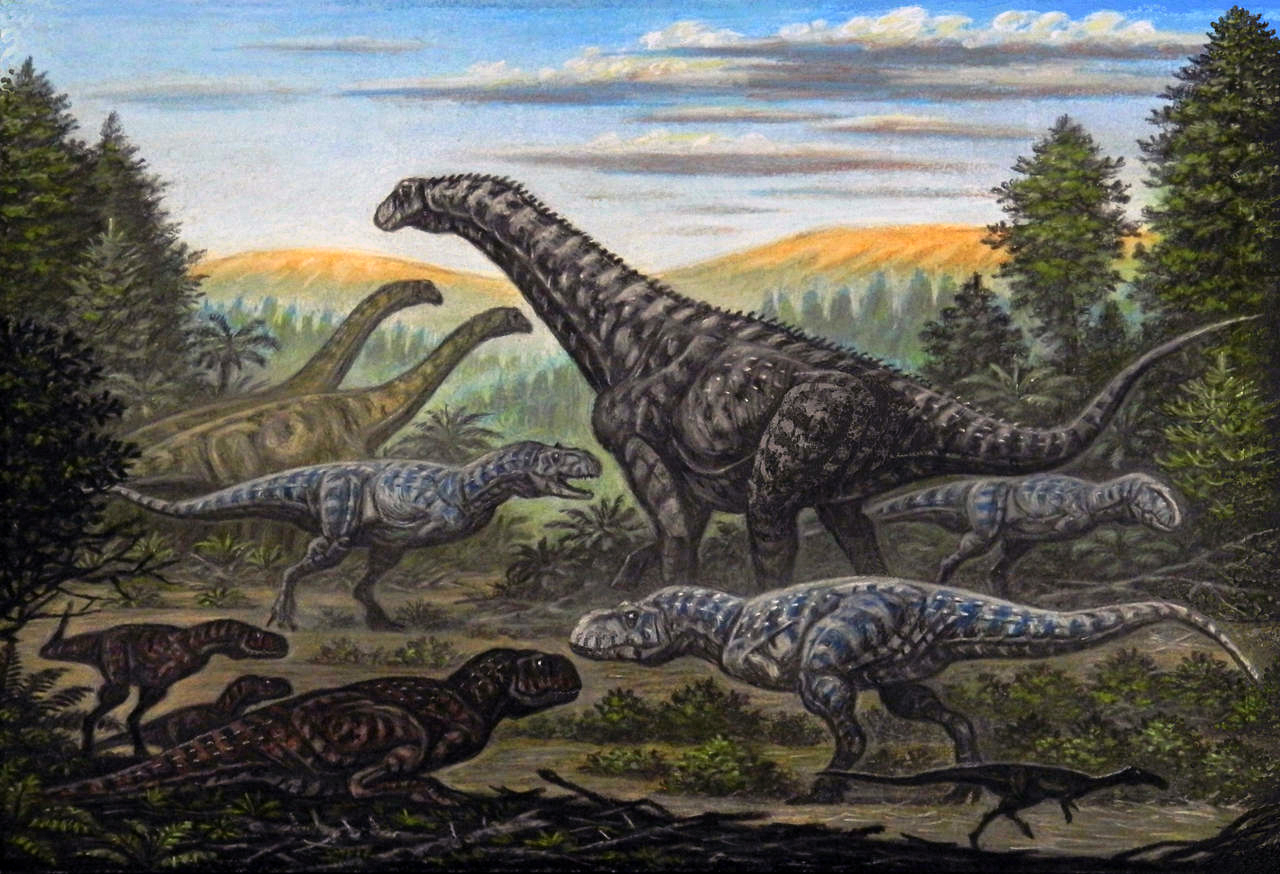
Dinosaurs of Lameta Formation in which a group of Rajasaurus (Middle) hunting an Isisaurus (Middle) with an Indosuchus (bottom left) watching it with her chicks and a Laevisuchus (Bottom right) running with two Jainosaurus (Top Left) in the background

Color key: Taxon / Reclassified taxon / Taxon falsely reported as present / Dubious taxon or junior synonym / Ichnotaxon / Ootaxon / Morphotaxon

Notes
Uncertain or tentative taxa are in small text
~~crossed out~~ taxa are discredited.

==== Ornithischians ====
| Genus | Species | Location | Stratigraphic position | Material | Notes | Images |
|---|---|---|---|---|---|---|
| Ankylosauria? Indet. | Indeterminate | Rahioli | | Isolated vertebrae, scapulocoracoid, humerus, femur, and several armor fragments such as hollow lateral spikes and solid dorsal scutes. | Described as a nodosaurid, but the limb bones are titanosaurian. | |
| Brachypodosaurus | B. gravis | Chota Simla Hill | | "Humerus." | May not be dinosaurian | |
| Ceratopsia? Indet. | Indeterminate | Kheda | | Horncore base. | Originally described as a ceratopsian horncore, but likely represents a theropod limb element or a dorsal rib of a theropod or a titanosauriform. | |
| Deltapodus | sp. | Jetholi | | Solitary footprint. | A Possible Late Cretaceous Stegosaur, Like Dravidosaurus. | |
| Hypsilophodontidae? Indet. | Indeterminate. | Marepalli, Jabalpur | | Teeth and other materials. | Hypsilophodontidae is not a natural grouping. | |
| Ornithischia? Indet. | Indeterminate | Kheda | | GSI/GC/2905 | Originally identified as an indeterminate ornithischian braincase. Later found out to be a Titanosaur dorsal vertebra. | |
| Spheroolithus? | sp. | Polgaon, Tidkepar | | Egg fossils. | Questionably assigned to this genus | |

==== Sauropods ====
| Genus | Species | Location | Stratigraphic position | Material | Notes | Images |
|---|---|---|---|---|---|---|
| Isisaurus | I. colberti | Dongargaon Hill; Taunri | | Holotype skeleton consists of cervical, dorsal, sacral, caudal vertebrae, ribs, pelvis, scapula, coracoid, left forelimb, and other bones. Other specimens, such as the skull, hindlimb, and foot bones, are unknown. | A lithostrotian titanosaur. | Isisaurus Jainosaurus Megaloolithus |
| Jainosaurus | J. septentrionalis | Bara Simla; Taunri | | "Basicranium and partial postcranial skeleton." "Humerus and Femur". | A colossosaurian titanosaur. | Isisaurus Jainosaurus Megaloolithus |
| Jainosaurus | J. cf. septentrionalis | Chhota Simla | | Partial skeleton including a rib fragrement, caudal centrum, humeri, radius and an articulated left limb. | A colossosaurian titanosaur. | Isisaurus Jainosaurus Megaloolithus |
| Titanosaurus | T. blanfordi | Bara Simla; Panchgaon; Pisdura Hill | | Caudal vertebrae. | A dubious genus of titanosaur. | Isisaurus Jainosaurus Megaloolithus |
| Titanosaurus | T. indicus | Bara Simla; Pisdura Hill | | Caudal Vertebrae, two partial rami of haemapophysis, partial left tibia, partial right fibula, and a partial referred femur. | A dubious genus of titanosaur. | Isisaurus Jainosaurus Megaloolithus |
| Titanosaurus | T.? rahioliensis | Rahioli Village | | About 34 teeth in total. | Might not belong to this genus. | Isisaurus Jainosaurus Megaloolithus |
| Megaloolithus | M. cylindricus | Chui Hill, Bara Simla, Nand region, Pavan, Ghorpend, Bagh Caves, Dhar, Indwan, Kadwal, Dholiya Raipuriya village, Akhada village, Jhaba village, Padlya village, Jhabua, Dohad, Jhalod, Garadi, Kheda, Rahioli, Dholi Dungri. | | Multiple specimens consist of fossilized egg shells that are covered in volcanic sediments | Sauropod egg fossils | Isisaurus Jainosaurus Megaloolithus |
| Megaloolithus | M. dhoridungriensis | Chui Hill, Bara Simla, Nand region, Pavan, Ghorpend, Bagh Caves, Dhar, Indwan, Kadwal, Dholiya Raipuriya village, Akhada village, Jhaba village, Padlya village, Jhabua, Dohad, Jhalod, Garadi, Kheda, Rahioli, Dholi Dungri. | | Multiple specimens consist of fossilized egg shells that are covered in volcanic sediments | Sauropod egg fossils | Isisaurus Jainosaurus Megaloolithus |
| Megaloolithus | M. jabalpurensis | Chui Hill, Bara Simla, Nand region, Pavan, Ghorpend, Bagh Caves, Dhar, Indwan, Kadwal, Dholiya Raipuriya village, Akhada village, Jhaba village, Padlya village, Jhabua, Dohad, Jhalod, Garadi, Kheda, Rahioli, Dholi Dungri. | | Multiple specimens consist of fossilized egg shells that are covered in volcanic sediments | Sauropod egg fossils | Isisaurus Jainosaurus Megaloolithus |
| Megaloolithus | M. khempurensis | Chui Hill, Bara Simla, Nand region, Pavan, Ghorpend, Bagh Caves, Dhar, Indwan, Kadwal, Dholiya Raipuriya village, Akhada village, Jhaba village, Padlya village, Jhabua, Dohad, Jhalod, Garadi, Kheda, Rahioli, Dholi Dungri. | | Multiple specimens consist of fossilized egg shells that are covered in volcanic sediments | Sauropod egg fossils | Isisaurus Jainosaurus Megaloolithus |
| Megaloolithus | M. megadermus | Chui Hill, Bara Simla, Nand region, Pavan, Ghorpend, Bagh Caves, Dhar, Indwan, Kadwal, Dholiya Raipuriya village, Akhada village, Jhaba village, Padlya village, Jhabua, Dohad, Jhalod, Garadi, Kheda, Rahioli, Dholi Dungri. | | Multiple specimens consist of fossilized egg shells that are covered in volcanic sediments | Sauropod egg fossils | Isisaurus Jainosaurus Megaloolithus |
| Megaloolithus | M. problematica | Chui Hill, Bara Simla, Nand region, Pavan, Ghorpend, Bagh Caves, Dhar, Indwan, Kadwal, Dholiya Raipuriya village, Akhada village, Jhaba village, Padlya village, Jhabua, Dohad, Jhalod, Garadi, Kheda, Rahioli, Dholi Dungri. | | Multiple specimens consist of fossilized egg shells that are covered in volcanic sediments | Sauropod egg fossils | Isisaurus Jainosaurus Megaloolithus |
| Megaloolithus | M. walpurensis | Chui Hill, Bara Simla, Nand region, Pavan, Ghorpend, Bagh Caves, Dhar, Indwan, Kadwal, Dholiya Raipuriya village, Akhada village, Jhaba village, Padlya village, Jhabua, Dohad, Jhalod, Garadi, Kheda, Rahioli, Dholi Dungri. | | Multiple specimens consist of fossilized egg shells that are covered in volcanic sediments | Sauropod egg fossils | Isisaurus Jainosaurus Megaloolithus |
| Megaloolithus | M. sp. | Chui Hill, Bara Simla, Nand region, Pavan, Ghorpend, Bagh Caves, Dhar, Indwan, Kadwal, Dholiya Raipuriya village, Akhada village, Jhaba village, Padlya village, Jhabua, Dohad, Jhalod, Garadi, Kheda, Rahioli, Dholi Dungri. | | Multiple specimens consist of fossilized egg shells that are covered in volcanic sediments | Sauropod egg fossils | Isisaurus Jainosaurus Megaloolithus |
| Titanosauriformes Indet. | Indeterminate | Ukala. | | Dorsal vertebrae, parts of the ilia and pelvis, and limb bones. | A titanosauriform sauropod. | Isisaurus Jainosaurus Megaloolithus |
| Sauropoda Indet. | indeterminate | Rahioli | | Several Humeri | The humeri ranges from 70 to 85 cm in length, they have gracility index that ranges from 73 to 78. | Isisaurus Jainosaurus Megaloolithus |
| Titanosauria Indet. | indeterminate | Temple Hill, Rahioli | | disarticulated remains. | Discovered alongside the Rajasaurus holotype. | Isisaurus Jainosaurus Megaloolithus |
| Titanosauria Indet. | indeterminate | Bara Simla | | partial skeleton, consisting of limb bones(including a femur), girdles, vertebrae(including cervical and caudal vertebrae) and a braincase. | An indeterminate Titanosaur. | Isisaurus Jainosaurus Megaloolithus |
| Titanosauria Indet. | indeterminate | Rajulwari village | | 9 to 10th caudal vertebrae and a nearly complete hindlimb(with femur, tibia, fibula and phalanges) that measures 2.1 metres. | Originally referred to Titanosaurus indicus. | Isisaurus Jainosaurus Megaloolithus |
| Titanosauria Indet. | indeterminate | Taunri | | Post Cranial material. | Indeterminate titanosaurs. | Isisaurus Jainosaurus Megaloolithus |

==== Theropods ====
===== Abelisaurids =====
| Genus | Species | Location | Stratigraphic position | Material | Notes | Images |
|---|---|---|---|---|---|---|
| Abelisauroidea Indet. | Indeterminate | | | Multiple specimens. | Could be referred to Abelisauridae or Noasauridae. | Rajasaurus Indosuchus Rahiolisaurus |
| Abelisauridae | Indeterminate | | | Multiple specimens. | Include form similar to Majungasaurus and forms similar to Carnotaurus. | Rajasaurus Indosuchus Rahiolisaurus |
| Compsosuchus | C. solus | Bara Simla | | "Vertebrae" | Previously considered a Noasaurid now considered an indeterminate Abelisaurid | Rajasaurus Indosuchus Rahiolisaurus |
| Indosaurus | I. matleyi | Bara Simla | | Partial skeleton, including a partial skull. | A majungasaurine abelisaurid | Rajasaurus Indosuchus Rahiolisaurus |
| Dryptosauroides | D. grandis | Bara Simla | | "Vertebrae." | A abelisaurd theropod | Rajasaurus Indosuchus Rahiolisaurus |
| Ellipsoolithus | E. khedaensis | Kheda | | Eggs | Theropod egg fossils. | Rajasaurus Indosuchus Rahiolisaurus |
| Indosuchus | I. raptorius | Bara Simla | | Cranial remains, including two braincases, as well as a nearly complete skeleton. | A abelisaurid theropod | Rajasaurus Indosuchus Rahiolisaurus |
| Ornithomimoides | O. barasimlensis | Bara Simla | | "Vertebrae." | A abelisaurid theropod | Rajasaurus Indosuchus Rahiolisaurus |
| Ornithomimoides | O. mobilis | Bara Simla | | "Vertebrae" | A abelisaurid theropod | Rajasaurus Indosuchus Rahiolisaurus |
| Orthogoniosaurus | O. matleyi | Bara Simla | | "Tooth" | A abelisaurid theropod | Rajasaurus Indosuchus Rahiolisaurus |
| Rahiolisaurus | R. gujaratensis | Rahioli Village | | Cervical, dorsal, sacral, and caudal vertebrae, portions of pectoral and pelvic girdles, and several hind limb bones of different individuals. | A brachyrostran abelisaurid | Rajasaurus Indosuchus Rahiolisaurus |
| Rajasaurus | R. narmadensis | Temple Hill, Rahioli | | A partial skeleton consists of maxillae, premaxillae, braincase, and quadrate bone on the skull; and spine, hip bone, legs, and tail in post-cranial remains. | A majungasaurine abelisaurid | Rajasaurus Indosuchus Rahiolisaurus |

===== Noasaurids =====
| Genus | Species | Location | Stratigraphic position | Material | Notes | Images |
|---|---|---|---|---|---|---|
| Laevisuchus | L. indicus | Bara Simla | | Only vertebrae. | A noasaurine noasaurid. | |
| Noasaurinae Indet. | Indeterminate | Pisdura Hill | | A partial dentary. | A noasaurine noasaurid. | |
| Noasauridae Indet. | Indeterminate | | | Multiple specimens. | May include femora from very large individuals. | |

===== Other Theropods =====
| Genus | Species | Location | Stratigraphic position | Material | Notes | Images |
|---|---|---|---|---|---|---|
| Coeluroides | C. largus | Bara Simla | | "Isolated vertebrae." | A Indeterminate theropod also known from Dabrazhin Formation of Kazakhstan | |
| Jubbulpuria | J. tenuis | Bara Simla | | "Vertebrae." | Likely junior synonym of Laevisuchus | |
| ?Megalosaurus | Type A-E | Rahioli | | Several teeth | The overall length of the teeths ranges from 0.7 to 6 cm, all were originally identified as belonging to Megalosaurus,(beside GSI Type No. 19988 as it was identified as a Majungasaurus tooth). However a specimen(GSI Type No. 19996) may instead represent a troodontid. | |
| Ornithomimidae? Indet. | Indeterminate | Bara Simla | | | Ceratosaurian taxa from the Lameta Formation have been erroneously referred to ornithomimdae. | |
| Theropoda Indet. | Indeterminate | | | GSI K27/572, fragmentary cervical vertebra. | Initially described as allosauroid. But the researchers didn't classify it as an abelisaurid, possibly representing a member of a clade outside of abelisauroidea, the preserved height of the vertebra is 16 cm. | |
| Trachoolithus | T. faticanus | Bara Simla | | Eggs. | Theropod egg fossils. | |

==== Indeterminate or chimaeric taxa ====
| Genus | Species | Location | Stratigraphic position | Material | Notes | Images |
|---|---|---|---|---|---|---|
| "Dubeynarainsaurus" | "D. sahni" | Sirolkhal | | "Partial dentary with associated teeth." | May instead be a pterosaur, proposed to be either belonging to the Infratrappean or Intertrappean beds, although if it were a pterosaur it would not be Maastrichtian. | |
| Lametasaurus | L. indicus | Bara Simla | | "Sacrum, ilia, tibia." "Sacrum, ilia, tibia, spines, armor." | Includes crocodylomorph, titanosaur scutes and possibly ankylosaurian osteoderms. Also includes abelisaurid material now removed from the type and is being assigned to the Rajasaurus. | |

=== Reptiles ===
==== Snakes ====
| Genus | Species | Location | Stratigraphic position | Material | Notes | Images |
|---|---|---|---|---|---|---|
| Madtsoia | M. pisdurensis | Pidura Hill | Upper | | A madtsoiid snake. | |
| Sanajeh | S. indicus | Dholi Dungri | | A skull, precloaca vertebrae and ribs. | A madtsoiid snake. | Sanajeh about to attack a titanosaur hatchling |

==== Crocodylomorphs ====
| Genus | Species | Location | Stratigraphic position | Material | Notes | Images |
|---|---|---|---|---|---|---|
| Dyrosauridae Indet. | Indeterminate. | Kisalpuri and Vikarabad. | | Vertebrae, eggs and teeth. | A non-phosphatosaurinae dyrosaurid neosuchian. | |

==== Turtles ====
| Genus | Species | Location | Stratigraphic position | Material | Notes | Images |
|---|---|---|---|---|---|---|
| Jainemys | J. pisdurensis | Pisdura hill | | | A kurmademydin kurmademydine. | |
| Pelomedusidae Indet. | Indeterminate | | | | A turtle. | |

=== Mammals ===
| Genus | Species | Location | Stratigraphic position | Material | Notes | Images |
|---|---|---|---|---|---|---|
| Avashishta | A. bacharamensis | Bacharam | | | A haramiyid mammaliaform. | |

=== Fishes ===
| Genus | Species | Location | Stratigraphic position | Material | Notes | Images |
|---|---|---|---|---|---|---|
| Eoserranus | E. hislopi | Maharashtra | | "articulated specimens" | A percomorph fish. | |
| Lepisosteus | L. indicus | Maharashtra | | "partial skull" | A lepisosteid fish. | |
| Pycnodus | P. lametae | Maharashtra | | "articulated specimen and several teeth" | A pycnodontid fish. | |

=== Mollusca ===
| Genus | Species | Location | Notes |
|---|---|---|---|
| Mollusca | Indeterminate | | |
| Gastropoda | Indeterminate | | |
| Viviparus | V. normalis | | |
| Physa | P. sp. | | |
| Paludina | P. deccanensis | | |
| Lymnaea | L. subulata | | |
| Unio | U. sp. | | |

== See also ==
- List of dinosaur-bearing rock formations
- Geology of India
- Deccan Traps
- Maevarano Formation, contemporaneous fossiliferous formation of Madagascar
- Intertrappean Beds contemporaneous formation in India, also known for its fossils
