= Eoserranus =

Eoserranus Temporal range: Maastrichtian

Scientific classification
- Kingdom: Animalia
- Phylum: Chordata
- Class: Actinopterygii
- Division: Teleostei
- Clade: Percomorpha
- Genus: †Eoserranus; Woodward, 1908
- Species: †E. hislopi

Binomial name
- †Eoserranus hislopi Woodward, 1908

Extinct genus of fishes

Eoserranus ("dawn Serranus") is an extinct genus of early freshwater percomorph fish that lived in India during the Late Cretaceous. It contains a single species, E. hislopi from the late Maastrichtian-aged Lameta Formation of Maharashtra.

Its name refers to the fact that it was initially thought to be related to serranids, though more recent studies suggest it to be an early percomorph of uncertain affinities. It is one of the few Cretaceous-aged percomorphs known, and one of the very few known from articulated skeletal remains. It is known from several nearly complete skulls and assorted postcranial remains.

== See also ==
- Prehistoric fish
- List of prehistoric bony fish
