= Buļļi =

Neighbourhood of Riga, Latvia

Coordinates: 57°00′44″N 23°57′24″E

Rītabuļļi
- Neighbourhood of Riga
- Buļļi
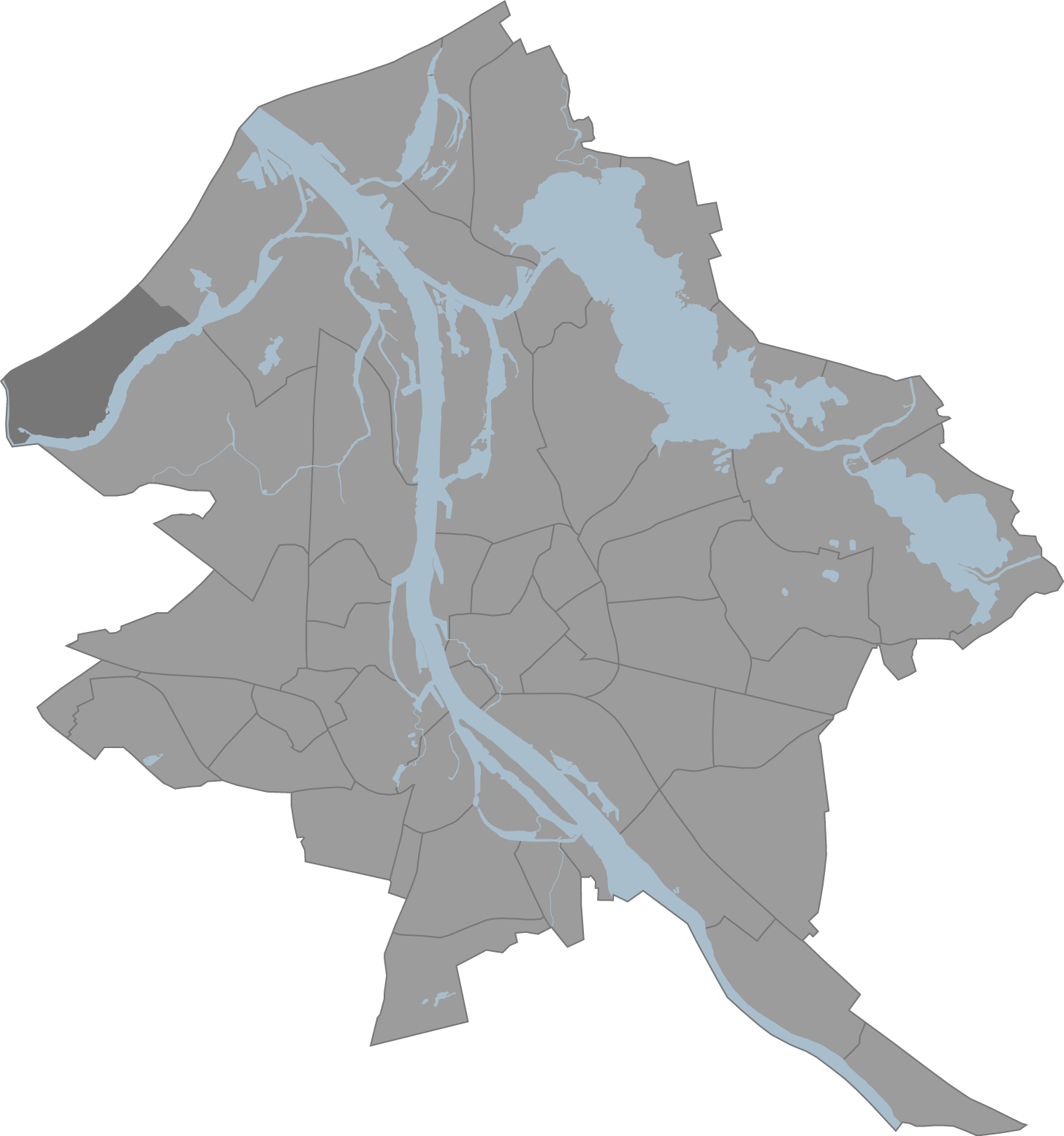
- Location of Buļļi in Riga
- Country: Latvia
- City: Riga
- District: Kurzeme District

Area
  - Total: 7.497 km^{2} (2.895 sq mi)

Population (2018)
  - Total: 265
  - Density: 35.3/km^{2} (91.5/sq mi)
- Website: apkaimes.lv

Buļļi or Rītabuļļi is a neighbourhood of Riga, the capital of Latvia. The Western area is known as Vakarbuļļi.

The boundaries of the Buļļi neighborhood are the Riga city border, the Gulf of Riga, the trail leading to the Gulf of Riga, Dzintara Street, an imaginary parallel line to Roņu Street, Buļļupe. The Buļļi neighborhood is located in the extreme Northwest corner of Riga on Buļļi Island. It borders the Daugavgrīva and Kleisti neighborhoods, as well as Jūrmala city, although by land the only connection to this neighborhood is with Daugavgrīva. Administratively, this neighborhood is located in the Kurzeme District, Riga. The area of the neighborhood is 7,497 square kilometres (2,895 sq mi).

Buļļi contains the Vakarbuļļi swimming location, which is an important recreational spot for Riga residents and in 2009 was the only swimming location in the territory of Riga, which has been awarded the Blue Flag beach designation.

== History ==
The Daugavgrīva (Buļļi) island has had a complicated history of formation – during the geological and geographical changes of the territory, which are related to the changes of the Lielupe and Daugava beds, Buļļupe was formed. Buļļupe, also called Buldurupe, is the old bed of the Lielupe, downstream to its former confluence with Daugava. Until the 17th century, the Lielupe did not have its own estuary. During the 1697 spring floods, when an ice block formed in the mouth of the Daugava, the waters of the Lielupe dug a new bed into the sea – they broke the dune strip of the current Buļļi or Daugavgrīva island in the middle (in the current Rītabuļļi district 3 kilometres (1.9 mi) from Daugavgrīva), creating a new bed, along which flows directly into The Gulf of Riga. The said estuary was called Ziemeļupe, also called Jāņupe. However, over time, the new estuary became clogged (it existed for less than 100 years), and near the Daugavgrīva seaside dune strip on the land side formed the current bay – Ziemeļupe. Again in 1709 and 1759 Lielupe (where the Ziemeļupe bay is located) broke Daugavgrīva island at the present-time location of Rītabuļļi and Daugavgrīva, which was in addition to the Lielupe drainage into the sea, however, that drainage gradually became clogged until it was later artificially filled. In 1755 (or 1757, according to different sources), in the regular spring floods, the Lielupe broke the dune strip at Vārnu pub and flowed into the sea near Stirnurags (a 13 kilometres (8.1 mi) long, narrow island appeared), as a result of which the modern Lielupe estuary was formed. The old lower reaches of the river, about 10 kilometres (6.2 mi) long from Vārnu pub to Daugavgrīva, got the name Buļļupe or Buldurupe.

Between 1765–1768, there were efforts to dam the new Lielupe bed, but in 1771 it repeatedly broke its way to the same place, creating the so called Jaunupe. At the same time, the current island of Daugavgrīva was created.

The Buļļi neighborhood has historically formed on the land of the Buļļi Manor, which was first mentioned in writings in 1495. Initially, there were fishing villages Rītabuļļi (Bullēni) and Vakarbuļļi (Buļļugals) on the land of this manor. In turn, the island names "Rītabuļļi" and "Vakarbuļļi" were given by old fishermen, because in the morning the sun is on the Rītabuļļi side, but in the evening on the Vakarbuļļi side.

Buļļi Manor (Bullenhof, Bullenfahr) was manor Daugavgrīva congregation territory. The location of the Buļļi Manor could have been located in the vicinity of the current Rojas Street 1. Buļļi Manor was mentioned in 1617 when the Duke of Courland Wilhelm leased it to his secretary Paul Špankavas, whose rights to this property was also approved by King Gustav Adolf of Sweden in 1621. Later in 1679 captain Spankus sold the property to Lieutenant General Martin Schwulz. At the end of the 17th century, the manor was reduced. The reduced manor was subsequently pledged by the King of Sweden to Herman Vitem von Nordek. In 1716, Prince Peter Gribic (Korribut de Gallizin) leased the manor to the aforementioned Herman von Nordek. In 1770, Buļļi Manor was retained by Herman von Nordek's widow Elizabeth. In 1820, the manor belonged to the heirs of the council advisor von Schultz, but in 1909, the owner was A. Benus (Venus). The Buļļi Manor is depicted in the patrimonial area and in 1688 on the maps of Lielvidzeme.

Around the 19th century, Buļļupe became a living river transport highway, because the depth was enough for small river steamers to swim along it.

During the first Latvian independence Riga city limits included Pārdaugava areas as well as Daugavgrīva island on the west side of the former Bolderājas rural areas (Buļļumuiža, Buļļuciems) Buļļi was included within the city of Riga.

In 1930s–40s (and most of 1960–1987 years) Buļļupe and Lielupe riverbed has had multiple deepenings aimed, firstly, to provide shipping, secondly, getting sand material Riga building needs. As a result, the dredging of the Buļļupe caused the floodplain meadows to be flooded and the shores to be transformed, as well as the river banks to be invaded. In 1930s years Buļļupe was the main traffic route between the River Daugava and Lielupe lower reaches.

Starting 1935, between the former Rīttabuļļi building and Buļļupe Bay, the newly designed streets were given names, but their construction was not completed (today, in this area is the Riga water treatment plant complex at Dzintara Street 60). At the beginning of the 1930s, summer houses were also being built in Rītabuļļi. During the Soviet occupation (1941), the summer houses left by the Baltic Germans, together with the plots of land, were assigned to the Baltic Fleet, where Red Fleet officers and their families settled there. After 1944, the left bank of the Daugava was annexed to Lenin district. In 1962, the districts were divided. In 1969, the part separated from the Lenin district, the Leningrad district was formed, which also included the Buļļi neighborhood.

After the restoration of independence, the Leningrad district, which includes the island of Daugavgrīva (including Buļļi), was renamed the Kurzeme district.

In the current situation, a wider network of streets (with the main street – Dzintara Street) can be observed only in Rītabuļļi, while the western part is mostly covered with forests, where Vakarbuļļi is a nature reserve, bordered by Vakarbuļļi mansion district. In addition, a large part of the Buļļi neighborhood is part of the Piejūra nature park, which was established in 1962 from Vecāķi to the mouth of the Gauja to preserve dune forests, dunes and the beach.

The territory of Daugavgrīva (Buļļu) Island of the nature park Piejūra includes 2 nature reserves: Daugavgrīva nature reserve and the already mentioned Vakarbuļļi nature reserve, which was established in 1993 and its area is 52 hectares (130 acres), the largest values of which are seaside meadows. An interesting fact is that plant research in Buļļi started already at the end of the 18th century. At the end of the 19th century (1894), the botanist Kupfer documented the find of the seaside army on Buļļi Island. During 1920s-30s many scientists have drawn attention to the importance of preserving the Buļļi landscape and vegetation, and the coastal area of Buļļugals has been and is an important resting place for migratory waders and waterfowl.

== Geography ==
The total area of the Buļļineighborhood is 749.7 hectares (1,853 acres), which is 1.5 times more than the average area of Riga neighborhoods. The length of the perimeter of the neighborhood border is 12,541 kilometres (7,793 mi). The minimum height of the surrounding relief surface corresponds to the sea level, but its maximum height is 14 metres (46 ft) above sea level. In the section from Lielupe to Rītabuļļi, the territory is characterized by the relief of small forested, irregular dune hills and deflationary depressions (2–10 metres (6 ft 7 in – 32 ft 10 in) above sea level).

Almost the whole area of Buļļi is located in the geomorphological micro-district of the Litorina and post-Littoral accumulation terraces, and only a narrow strip along the Bulļupe River belongs to the geomorphological micro-district of the Daugava Valley. Geologically, the area is dominated by Littoral and post-Littoral seas, lagoons and alluvial sandy sediments with wind-blown sand on the surface. Along the sea shore stretches a sandy beach, which is separated from the rest of the area by an irregular forward dune 250–400 m wide. The coast is subject to intensive coastal washing. Quaternary sediments beneath the blankets that the Buļļi are very thick (up to 60 m), located in the Upper Devonian Gauja suites maroon, less sage quartz sandstones with 0.5–1 metre (1 ft 8 in – 3 ft 3 in) thick aleirolite and clay interlayers.

=== Territorial division ===
Of the total area of the Buļļi neighborhood, 12.4% or 657.1 hectares (1,624 acres) is occupied by surface water bodies – in the Southwest part of the neighborhood it is Lielupe, but in the South part Buļļupe with separate water traps (for example, Kuiļjoma), the area of which varies depending on the season and winds through Lielupe and Daugava in Buļļupe can significantly increase the water level.

The largest part of the Buļļi neighborhood – 73.9% or 554.1 hectares (1,369 acres) – is occupied by nature and green areas. There are also large specially protected nature territories – nature park Piejūra (573.5 ha), in the south-western part of SW, in the regularly flooded floodplains of the Buļļupe, there is also the Vakarbuļļi nature reserve.

6.8% or 51.3 hectares (127 acres) of the Buļļi neighborhood is defined as a building area with greenery (primarily as a residential building), allowing to preserve and slightly expand the existing sparse residential building in Rītabuļļi (mainly along Dzintara Street). Other permitted uses of the territory in Rītabuļļi are of territorial importance, as they essentially refer only to the nature of the buildings already existing in Vakarbuļļi and Rītabuļļi (mainly detached house building territories).

- 73.9% – Greenery and nature territory.
- 12.4% – Water objects.
- 6.8% – Building area with greenery.
- 3.7% – Highways, highways and streets.
- 2.5% – Private house building territory.
- 0.7% – Mixed building area.

== Infrastructure ==
The connection of the neighborhood with the rest of the territory of Riga is ensured through the vicinity of Daugavgrīva. The main streets are Dzintara Street, Ilmeņa Street and Rojas Street, but the planned scheme of the Riga city street network envisages only local and inferior streets in this area, thus preserving the very peaceful character of this area on the outskirts of the city.

=== Public transport ===
The provision of public transport in the Buļļi neighborhood can be assessed as very weak, as this neighborhood is served by only one Riga public transport route with no direct connection to the city center. During the summer season, a second bus route runs to Rītabuļļi on weekends and weekends.

=== Provision of social infrastructure ===
None of the social infrastructure objects (pre-school educational institutions, general education institutions, higher education institutions, other educational and training institutions, libraries, medical institutions, cultural houses and other cultural institutions, social care institutions, military institutions, religious institutions, prisons are located in the territory of Buļļi), municipal and state police stations and sports facilities.
