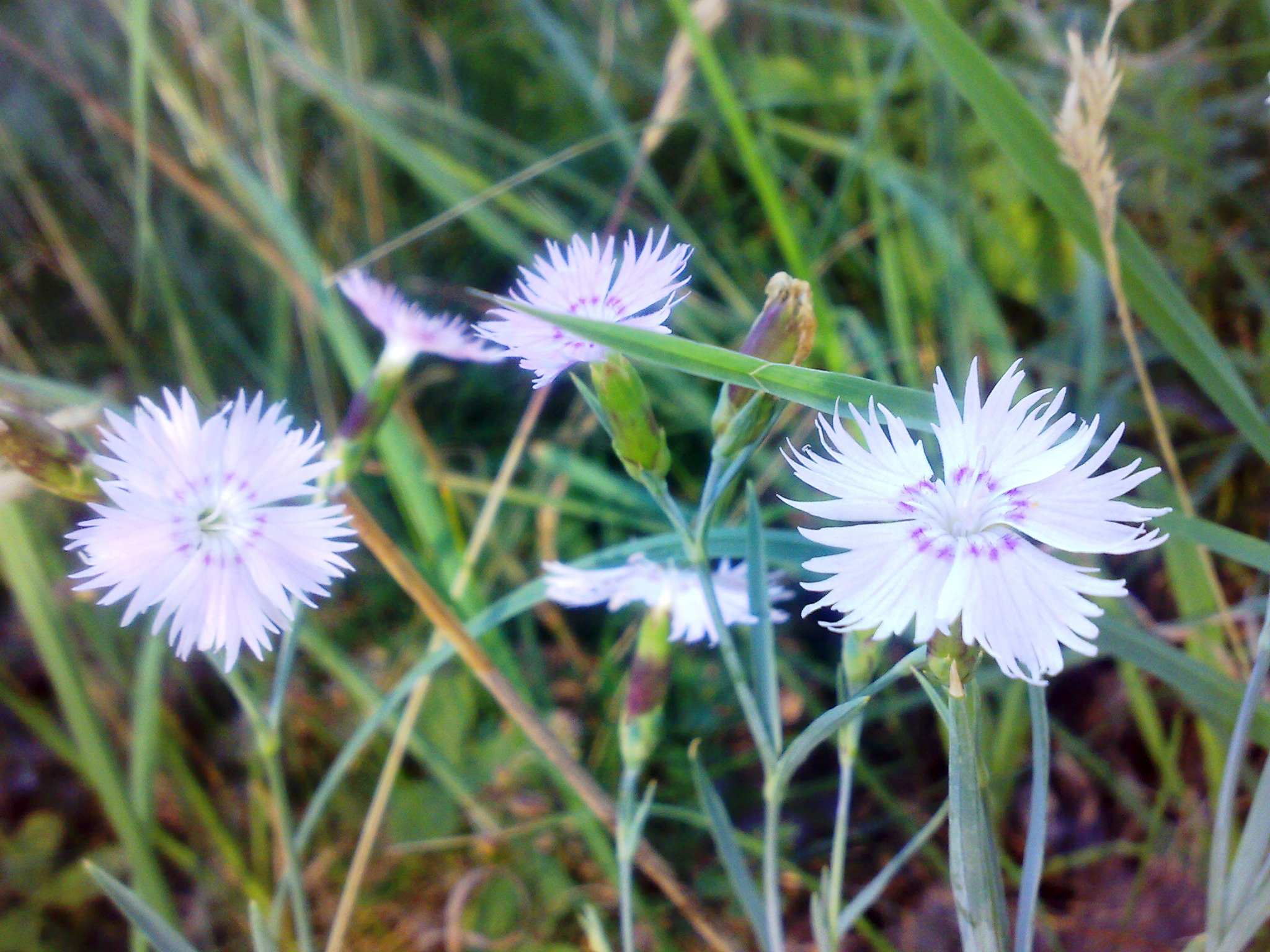

Scientific classification
- Kingdom: Plantae
- Clade: Embryophytes
- Clade: Tracheophytes
- Clade: Spermatophytes
- Clade: Angiosperms
- Clade: Eudicots
- Order: Caryophyllales
- Family: Caryophyllaceae
- Genus: Dianthus
- Species: D. arenarius

Binomial name
- Dianthus arenarius L.

= Dianthus arenarius =

Species of flowering plant

Dianthus arenarius, the sand pink, is a species of Dianthus typically found on the shores of the Baltic Sea, although there are populations elsewhere in colder areas of Europe where there are sandy soils. The unimproved species, and at least one cultivar, 'Little Maiden', are available from commercial suppliers.

== Subspecies ==
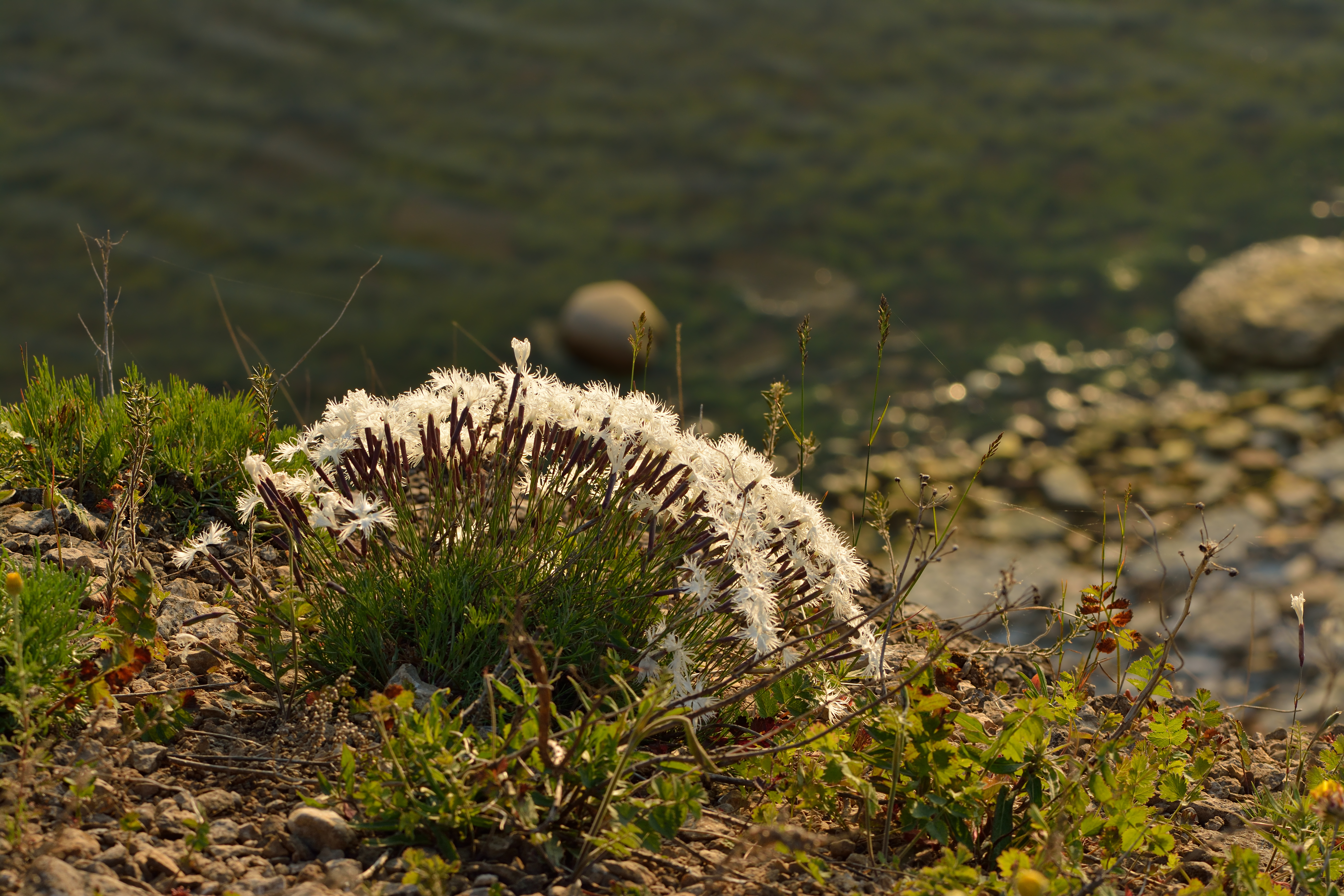
sand pink (Dianthus arenarius), Pakri cliff, Northwestern Estonia

A number of subspecies have been described:

- Dianthus arenarius subsp. arenarius
- Dianthus arenarius subsp. bohemicus (Novák) O. Schwarz
- Dianthus arenarius subsp. borussicus Vierh.
- Dianthus arenarius subsp. pseudoserotinus (Blocki) Tutin
- Dianthus arenarius subsp. pseudosquarrosus (Novák) Kleopow
