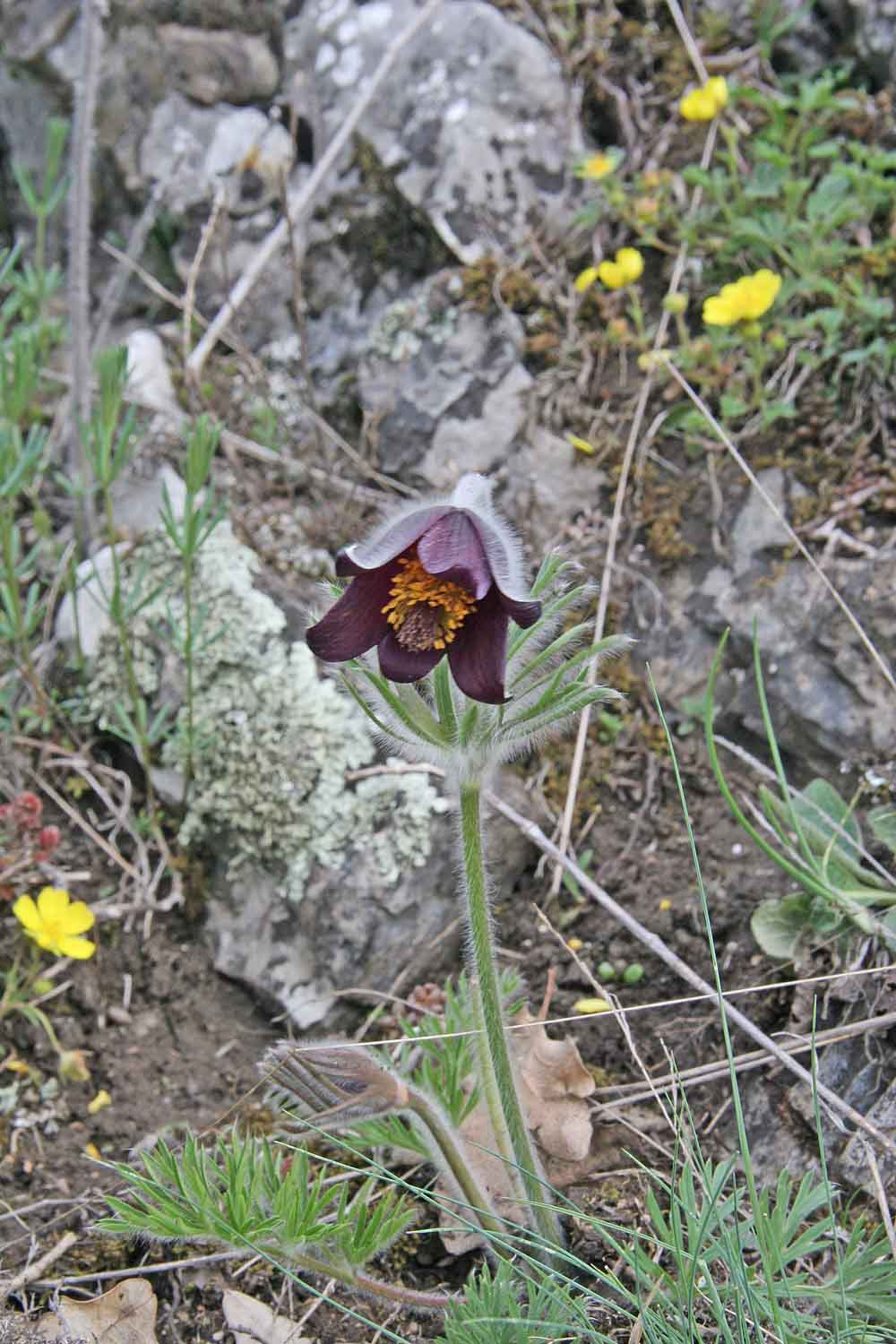
- Plant of subsp. bohemica in flower

Scientific classification
- Kingdom: Plantae
- Clade: Tracheophytes
- Clade: Angiosperms
- Clade: Eudicots
- Order: Ranunculales
- Family: Ranunculaceae
- Genus: Pulsatilla
- Species: P. pratensis

Binomial name
- Pulsatilla pratensis (L.) Mill.

Synonyms
- List: Anemone affinis (Lasch) G.Don; Anemone campaniflora Stokes; Anemone helleboriflora Richt. ex Pritz.; Anemone hungarica (Soó) Soó; Anemone obsoleta Steud.; Anemone pratensis L.; Anemone × zichyi Schur; Pulsatilla affinis Lasch; Pulsatilla bohemica (Skalický) Tzvelev; Pulsatilla breynii Rupr.; Pulsatilla hungarica Soó; Pulsatilla nigricans Störck; Pulsatilla obsoleta Sweet; Pulsatilla pratensis var. albida (Domin) Skalický; Pulsatilla pratensis subsp. bohemica Skalický; Pulsatilla pratensis subsp. flavescens (Hazsl.) Holub; Pulsatilla reflexa Gilib.; Pulsatilla ucrainica (Ugr.) Wissjul.; Pulsatilla × zichyi Schur

= Pulsatilla pratensis =

Species of flowering plant

Pulsatilla pratensis (syn. Anemone pratensis), the small pasque flower, is a species of flowering plant in the family Ranunculaceae, native to central and eastern Europe, from southeast Norway and western Denmark south and east to Bulgaria. It grows from near sea level in the north of the range, up to 2,100 m (6,900 ft) in the south of its range.

== Name ==
The Latin specific epithet pratensis means "from the meadow", referring to one of its typical habitats.

== Description ==
It is a herbaceous perennial plant growing to 8–30 cm (3–12 in) tall. The leaves are finely divided and thread-like, and densely covered with silvery hairs. The flowers are 2–3 cm (0.8–1.2 in) long, pendulous, bell-like, the tepals with reflexed tips; flower colour varies from purple in the north of the species' range to greenish-violet in the south. The flowers are hermaphrodite, and are pollinated by bees; flowering is from early to mid spring.

== Subspecies ==
There are a number of subspecies:

- Pulsatilla pratensis subsp. pratensis
- Pulsatilla pratensis subsp. bohemica Skalický
- Pulsatilla pratensis subsp. hungarica (Soó) Soó
- Pulsatilla pratensis subsp. nigricans (Störck) Zämelis
- Pulsatilla pratensis subsp. ucrainica (Ugr.) ined.
- Pulsatilla pratensis nothosubsp. zichyi (Schur) Zämelis & Paegle

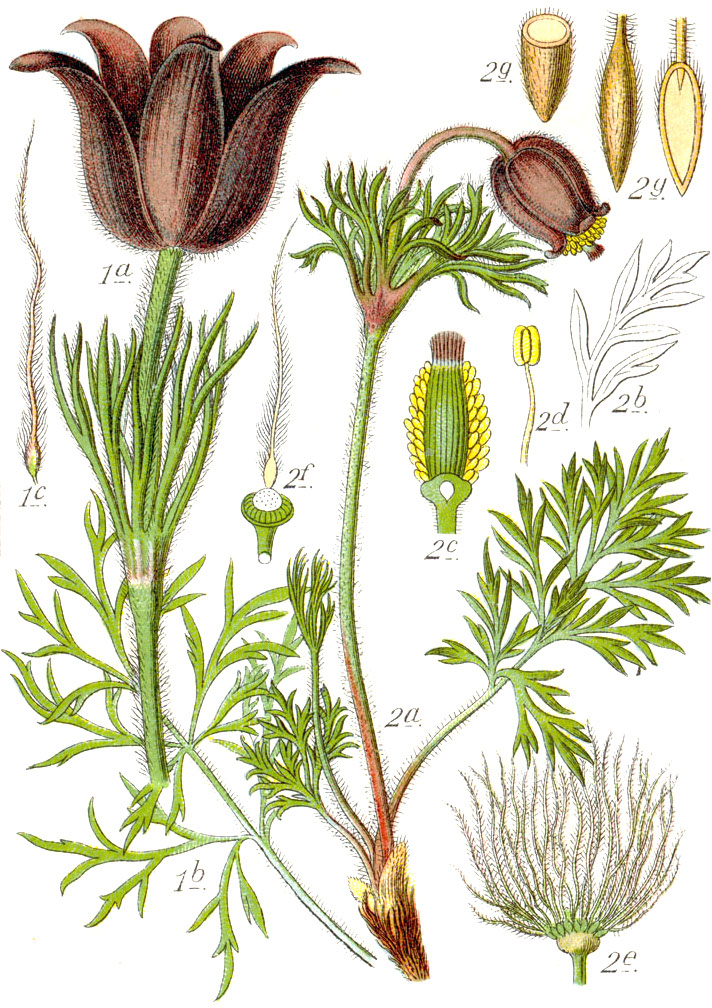
Anemone pratensis from the Deutschlands Flora in Abbildungen, 1796

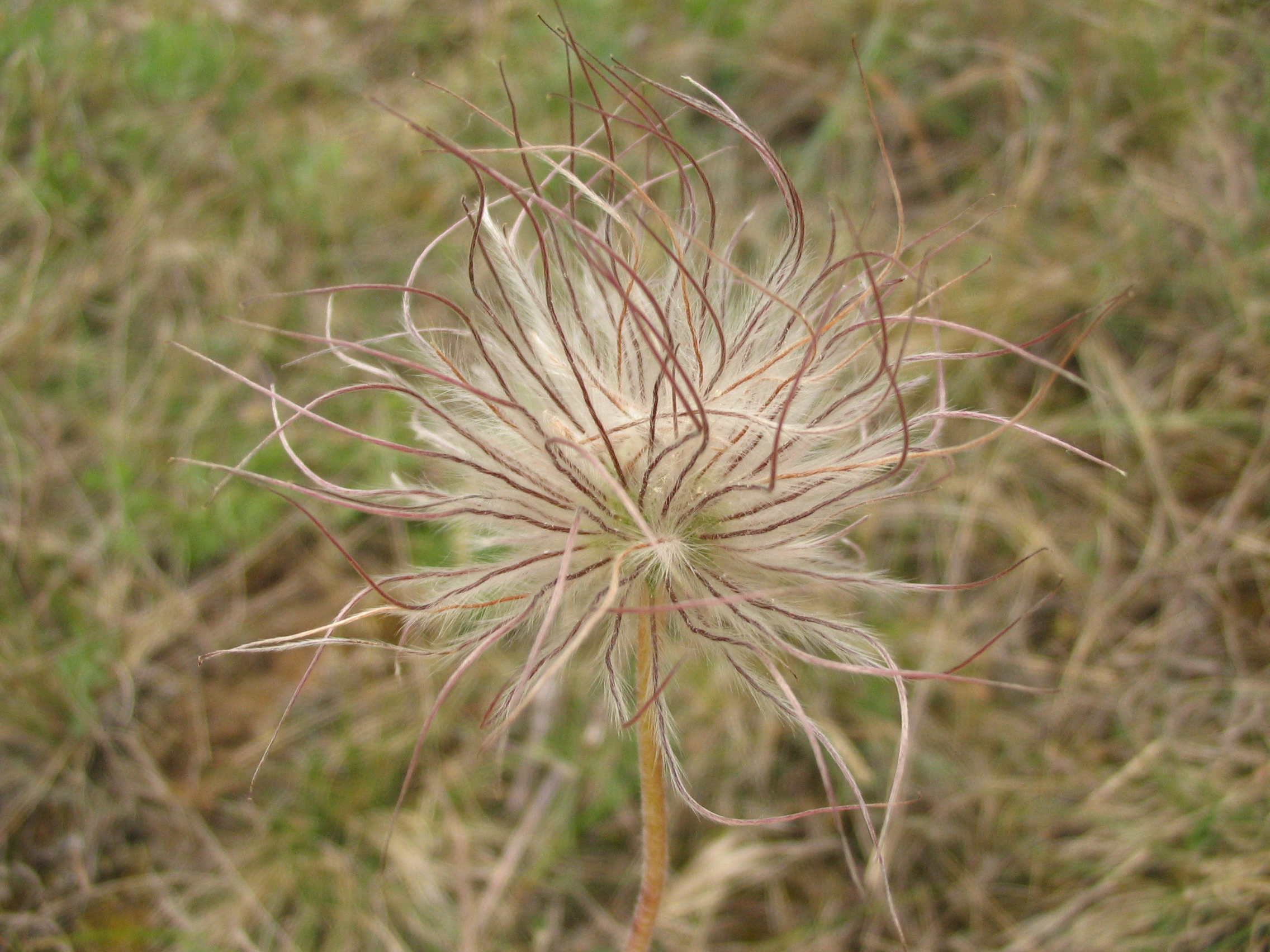
Seedhead of subsp. hungarica

Pulsatilla pratensis subsp. hungarica grows in E Slovakia, NE Hungary and NW Romania. In Slovakia and Romania it is categorized as critically endangered CR. In Hungary it is protected by law. It occurs on open sand-plains and avoids limestone. In Hungary it can be found in two regions, the Nyírség and Bodrogköz.

== Cultivation and uses ==
This plant is toxic, but can be dissipated through heat or drying.
