= Lielupe =

River in Latvia

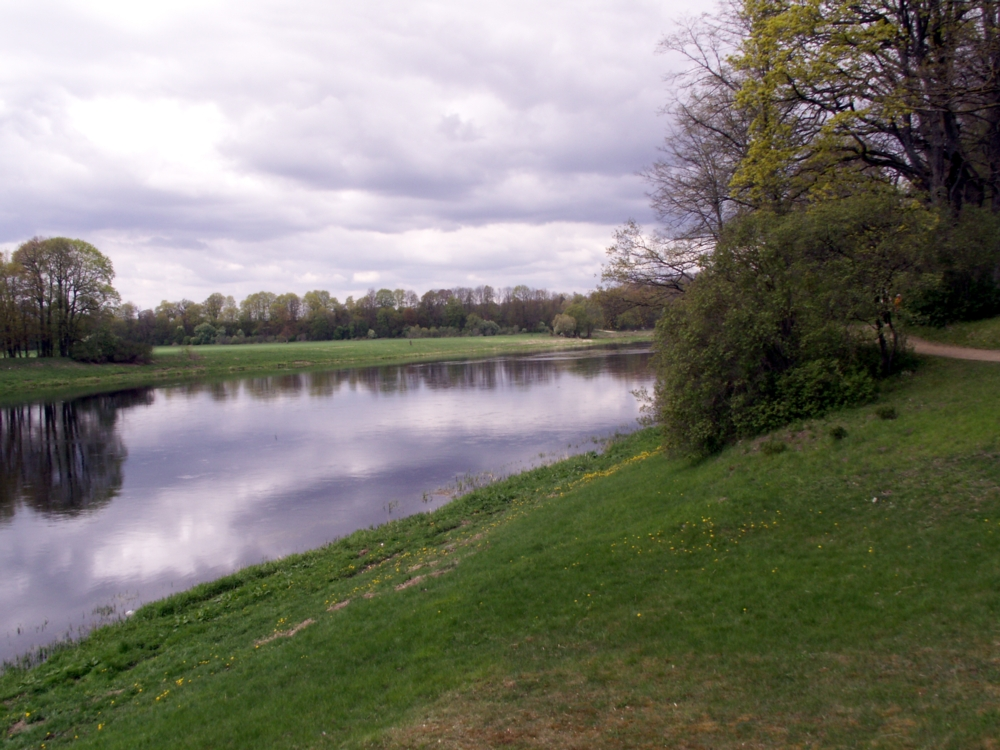
- Lielupe near Mežotne

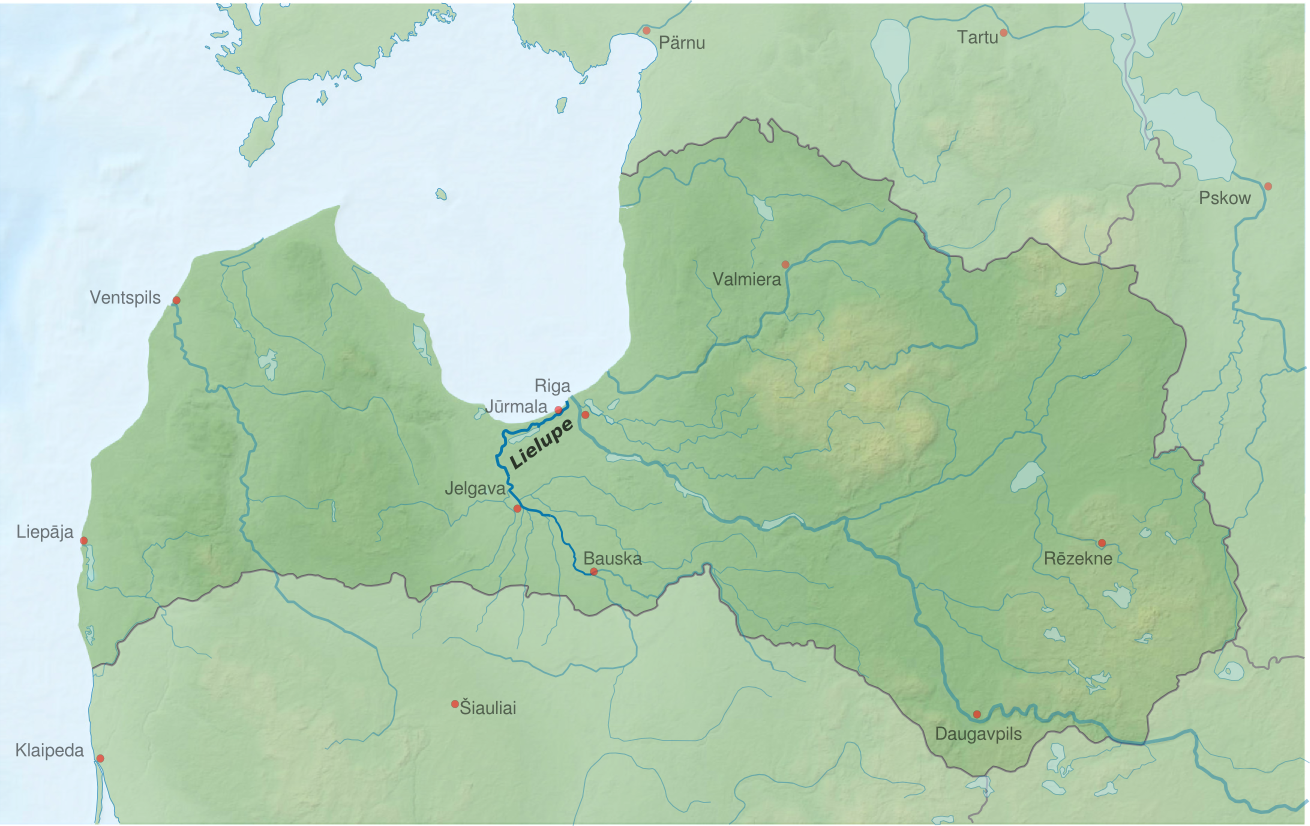
- Course of the Lielupe in Latvia

Location
- Country: Latvia, Lithuania

Physical characteristics
- Source
  - location: Bauska, Latvia
- Mouth
  - location: Gulf of Riga at Vakarbuļļi
  - coordinates: 57°00′31″N 23°55′59″E
- Length: 119 kilometres (74 mi)
- Basin size: 17,600 km^{2} (6,800 sq mi) (In Latvia: 8,800 km^{2} or 3,400 sq mi)
- Discharge
  - average: 106 m^{3}/s (3,700 cu ft/s)

The Lielupe (Note: Latvian pronunciation: [li.elupe], lit. 'large river'; Lithuanian: Lielupė; German: Kurländische Aa) is a river in central Latvia. Its length is 119 km (74 mi), or 310 km (190 mi) if the Mēmele River is counted as part of it. The surface area of its drainage basin is 17,600 km^{2} (6,800 sq mi). The average fall of the Lielupe is about 0.1 m/km (0.53 ft/mi) and its average flow is 106 m^{3}/s (3,700 cu ft/s), although a maximum of 1,380 m^{3}/s (49,000 cu ft/s) has been reached during floods.

== Physical geography ==
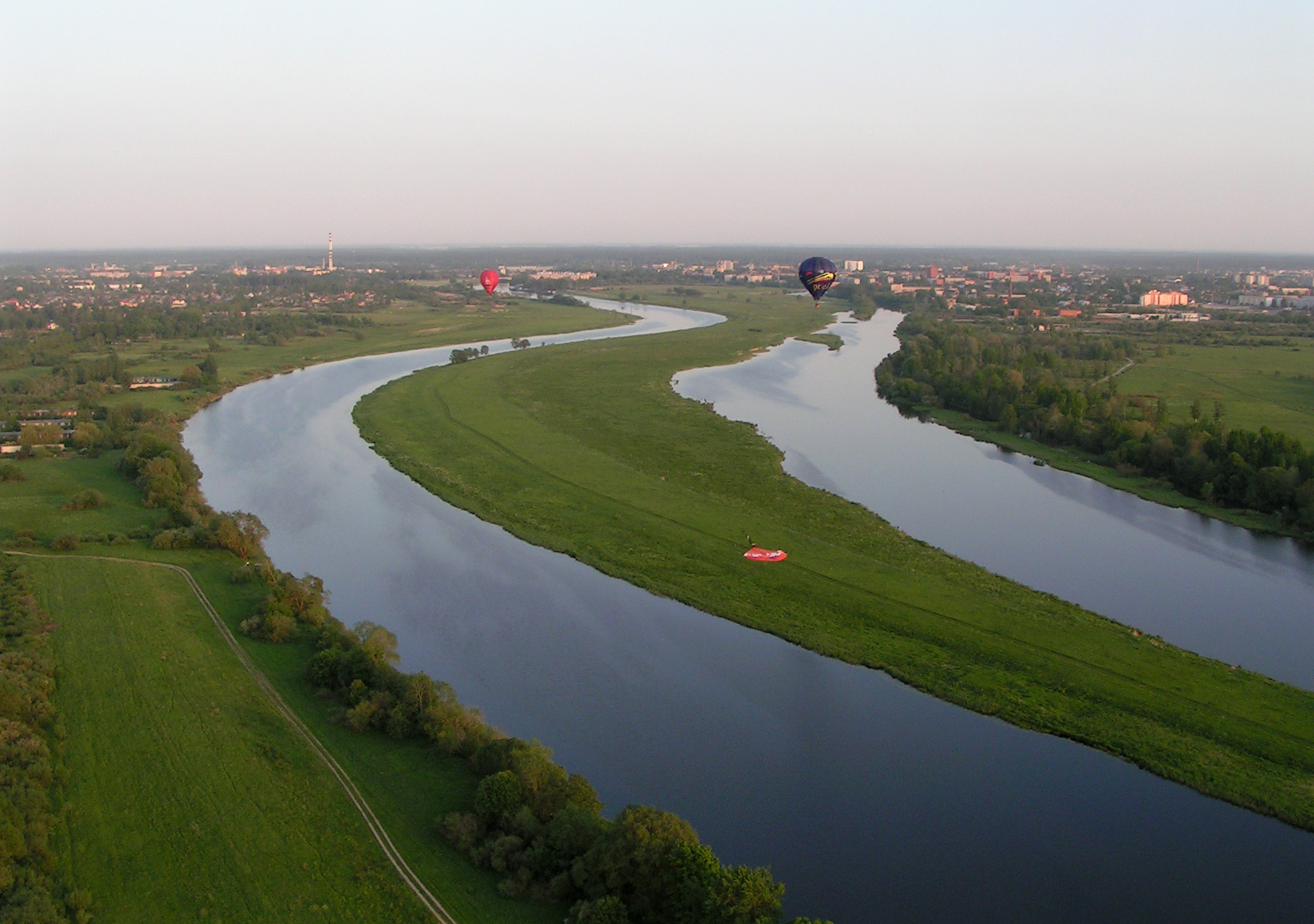
Lielupe near Jelgava, Latvia.

The Lielupe begins at the confluence of the Mēmele and Mūsa rivers near Bauska. For the upper part of its course, the river flows through a dolomite valley with a few small rapids, until it reaches Mežotne, where it widens and deepens over the flat Zemgale Plain. For many years the Lielupe would frequently overflow its shallow banks and flood surrounding fields and villages, particularly during the spring thaw. Today many parts of the Lielupe's banks are contained with earthen dikes to prevent disastrous floods. Much of the Lielupe is covered in river grasses. At its lower reaches, the river flows parallel to the coastline of the Gulf of Riga; the city of Jūrmala stretches for almost 30 km (19 mi) between the river and the sea. Eventually the Lielupe flows into the Baltic Sea, while the Buļļupe branch (German: Kurische Aa) flows into the Daugava River. The modern mouth of the river appeared in 1755. Before then the Buļļupe was the Lielupe's main channel.

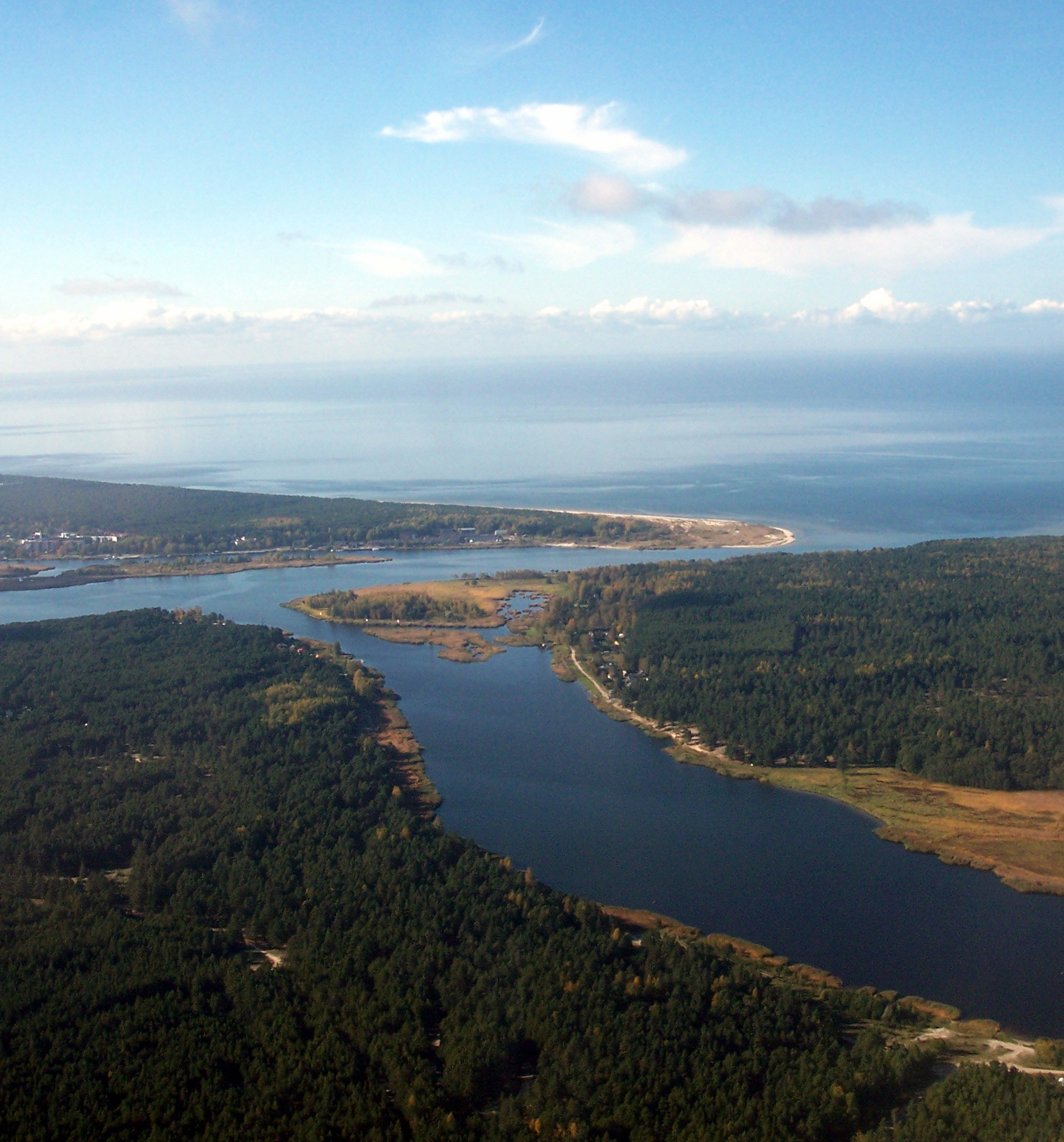
The Lielupe flows into the Baltic Sea, while the Buļļupe branch flows towards the Daugava River to the northeast.

About 50-55% of the water discharge of the river is from melted snow. The Lielupe is navigable for a range of 100 km (60 mi), the longest continuous range among Latvian rivers. Municipalities along the river include Bauska, Mežotne, Jelgava, Kalnciems, Jūrmala and Riga.

The Lielupe also gives its name to a railway station and a neighbourhood in the city of Jūrmala.

=== Tributaries ===
The following rivers are tributaries to the river Lielupe (from source to mouth):

- Left: Mūša (Mūsa), Īslīce, Svitene, Sesava, Vircava, Platone, Svēte (Švėtė)
- Right: Nemunėlis (Mēmele), Garoze, Iecava
