= Aleurite =

Aleurite is an unconsolidated sediment with a texture intermediately between sand and clay, similar to silt, with particle sizes ranging from 0.01 to 0.1 millimetres (0.00039 to 0.00394 in).

== Etymology ==
The name aleurite is derived from the Greek word aleuron 'flour'.

== Description ==
The term aleurite is mainly used in Russian geology, where it is described from the Baltic and Kara Seas, and as a derivative in Mongolia, such as the Dushihin Formation, where it occurs in lenses. Aleurite primarily comprises mineral grains (quartz, feldspar, mica, and others). The term aleurite was proposed by Soviet petrographer Alexander Nikolayevich Zavaritsky in 1930. Aleurite is used in the production of the cement and building ceramics.
