= Dhirendra Kishore Chakravarti =

Indian geologist and palaentologist

Dhirendra Kishore Chakravarti (1902 – after 1985) was an Indian geologist and paleontologist, who worked at Banaras Hindu University in the Geological Museum (now part of the Institute of Science).

In 1934, he was the first Indian to describe a species of dinosaur, Brachypodosaurus gravis (now considered dubious). In 1935, he contested the interpretation of Lametasaurus indicus as an armoured dinosaur, arguing that it was a chimera.

In 1982, the Geological Society of India organised a Festschrift in his honour.

== Publications ==
- Chakravarti, Dhirendra Kishore (1931). "On a Stegadon molar from the older Gangetic alluvium near Benares". Q. J. Min. Met. Soc. India (3): 115–124. ISBN 9780813720272. Cited in Charles Lewis Camp: Bibliography of Fossil Vertebrates 1928-1933; Geological Society of America; 1940; ASIN B001O2KAIK
- Chakravarti, D. K. (1934). "On a stegosaurian humerus from the Lameta beds of Jubbulpore". Quarterly Journal of the Geological, Mining, and Metallurgical Society of India (30): 75–79.
- Chakravarti, D. K. (1935). "Is Lametasaurus indicus an armored dinosaur?". American Journal of Science. 5. 30 (176): 138–141. Bibcode:1935AmJS...30..138C. doi:10.2475/ajs.s5-30.176.138.
- Chakravarti, Dhirendra Kishore (1957). "A geological, palaeontological and phylogenetic study of the Elephantoidea of India, Pakistan and Burma: Part I Gomphotheriidae". J. Pal. Soc. India. 2: 83–94. ISBN 9780813710921. Cited in Camp, C. L., Allison H. J., Nichols, R. H.: Bibliography of Fossil Vertebrates 1954-1958; Geological Society of America; 1 May 1964; ASIN B001OPDDKE
