= Om Prakash Sharma =

Om Prakash Sharma may refer to:

- Om Prakash Sharma (artist) (born 1932), Indian painter, visual artist, and professor
- Om Prakash Sharma (Delhi politician) (born 1953), Indian politician from Delhi
- Om Prakash Sharma (Nagaland politician), Indian former governor of Nagaland
- Om Prakash Sharma (Nepali politician), Minister of Province 2
- Om Prakash Sharma (Uttar Pradesh politician) (died 2021), Indian politician
- Om Prakash Sharma (writer) (1924–1998), Indian writer of detective fiction

== See also ==
- O. P. Sharma (disambiguation)
