= Government Museum and Art Gallery, Chandigarh =

Museum in Chandigarh, India

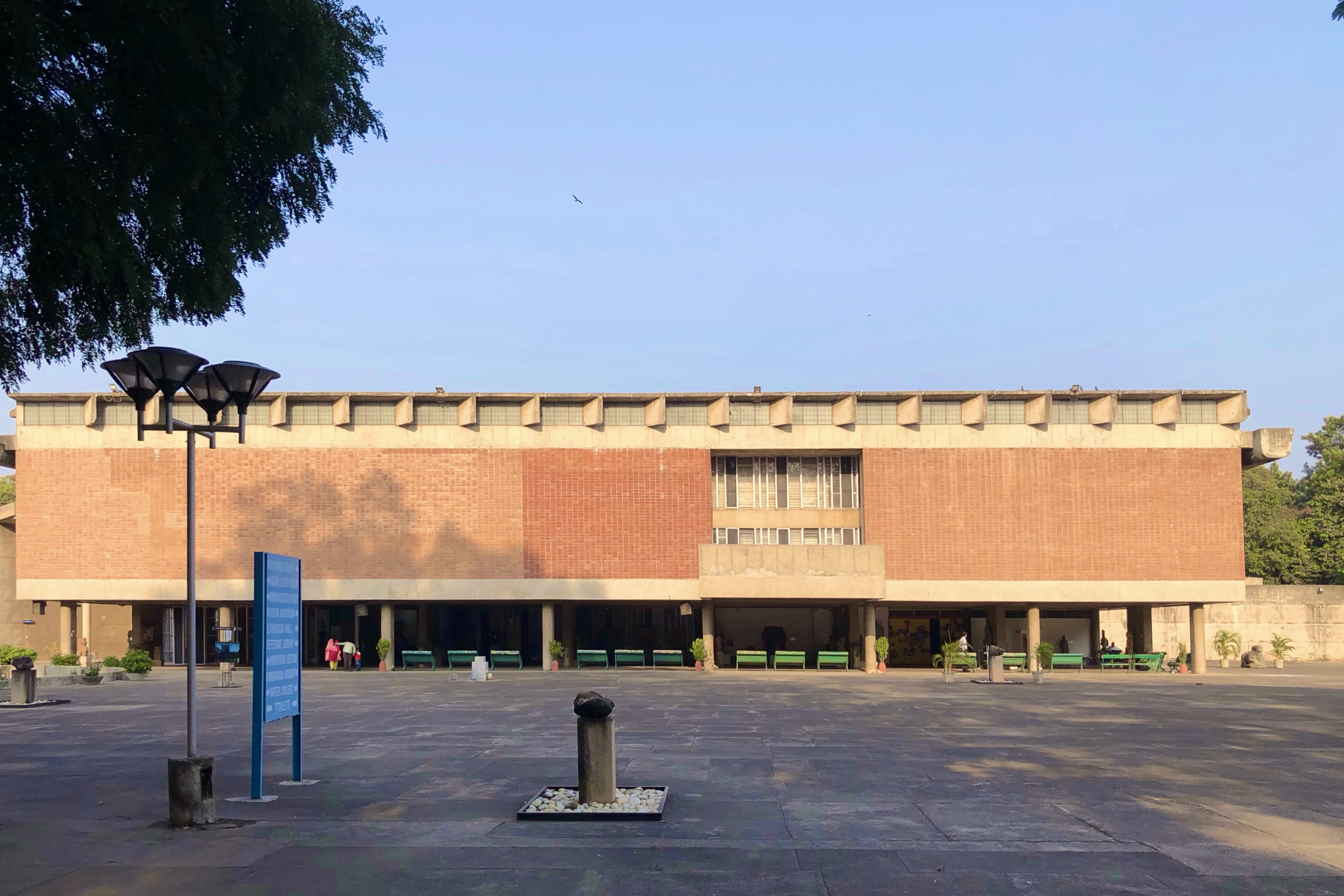
- The Government Museum and Art Gallery in Chandigarh, India

- Location of Government Museum and Art Gallery in India
- Established: May 6, 1968
- Location: Chandigarh, India
- Coordinates: 30°44′56″N 76°47′15″E
- Type: Art museum, Architecture museum, Natural history museum
- Collection size: Approx. 10,000 artefacts
- Architect: Le Corbusier
- Owner: Chandigarh Administration
- Website: chdmuseum.gov.in

Government Museum and Art Gallery, Chandigarh, is a public museum of North India having collections of Gandharan sculptures, sculptures from ancient and medieval India, Pahari and Rajasthani miniature paintings. It owes its existence to the partition of India. Prior to the partition, much of the collections of art objects, paintings and sculptures present here were housed in the Central Museum, Lahore, the then capital of Punjab. The museum has one of the largest collection of Gandharan artefacts in the world.

After the partition, the division of collections took place on April 10, 1948. Sixty per cent of objects were retained by Pakistan and forty per cent collection fell in the share of India. The museum was inaugurated on 6 May 1968 by Dr. M. S. Randhawa, the then Chief Commissioner of Chandigarh.

== History ==
The Government Museum and Art Gallery were built for housing the artefacts received from the Lahore Museum during the partition of India. The building was designed by the Swiss-born French architect, Le Corbusier along with his associate architects namely Manmohan Nath Sharma, Pierre Jeanneret and Shiv Dutt Sharma. The design was completed during 1960-62 and construction took place between 1962 and 1967. It is one of the three museums designed by Le Corbusier, the other two being Sanskar Kendra, in Ahmedabad, and National Museum of Western Art, in Tokyo.

== Building ==
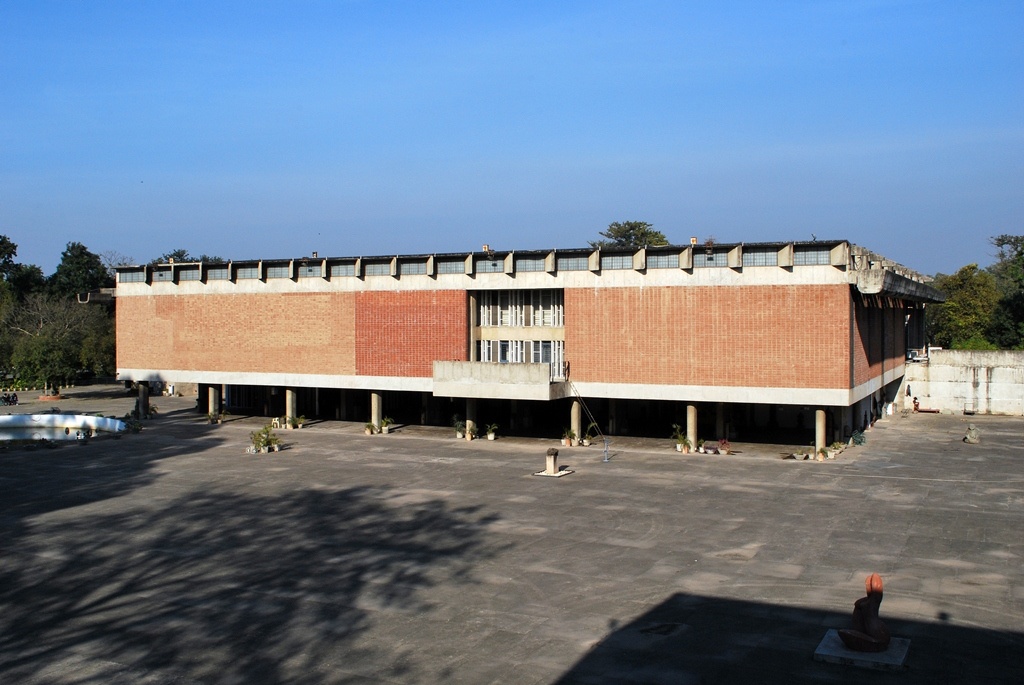
The main Museum building

The building is a museum and art gallery which regularly conducts art acquisition programs for expansion. Envisaged as a vehicle for transmission of knowledge in the Second Five Year Plan and the National Education Policy, it serves as a unique cultural and historical resource for the region. Having a significant collection of Gandhara sculptures, Pahari miniature paintings and contemporary Indian art, it is regularly visited by tourists, artists, scholars and students. Researchers, architects and scholars on Le Corbusier and Modernization are also frequent visitors to the building and its surrounding. The ensemble to study its architectural values as it represents the series of museums designed by Le Corbusier. The pivoted entrance, metal-panelled door, fixed furniture, display systems, and exposed concrete sculpturesque gargoyles are symbolic of the prevailing style of Chandigarh's architecture. The mural in the museum reception area executed by one of India's finest contemporary artists, Satish Gujral adds colour to the otherwise stark exposed concrete building.

The museum library is a rich repository of books on subjects of art, architecture and the history of art. A special section is dedicated to Dr. M. S. Randhawa, containing archival records of his correspondence on the Making of Chandigarh, available to scholars in a digitized version. The adjacent auditorium serves as a lecture hall for extended activities of the museum such as lectures, film screenings and cultural events. The interior detailing of the auditorium represents the Modernist tradition that was introduced in Chandigarh by Le Corbusier.

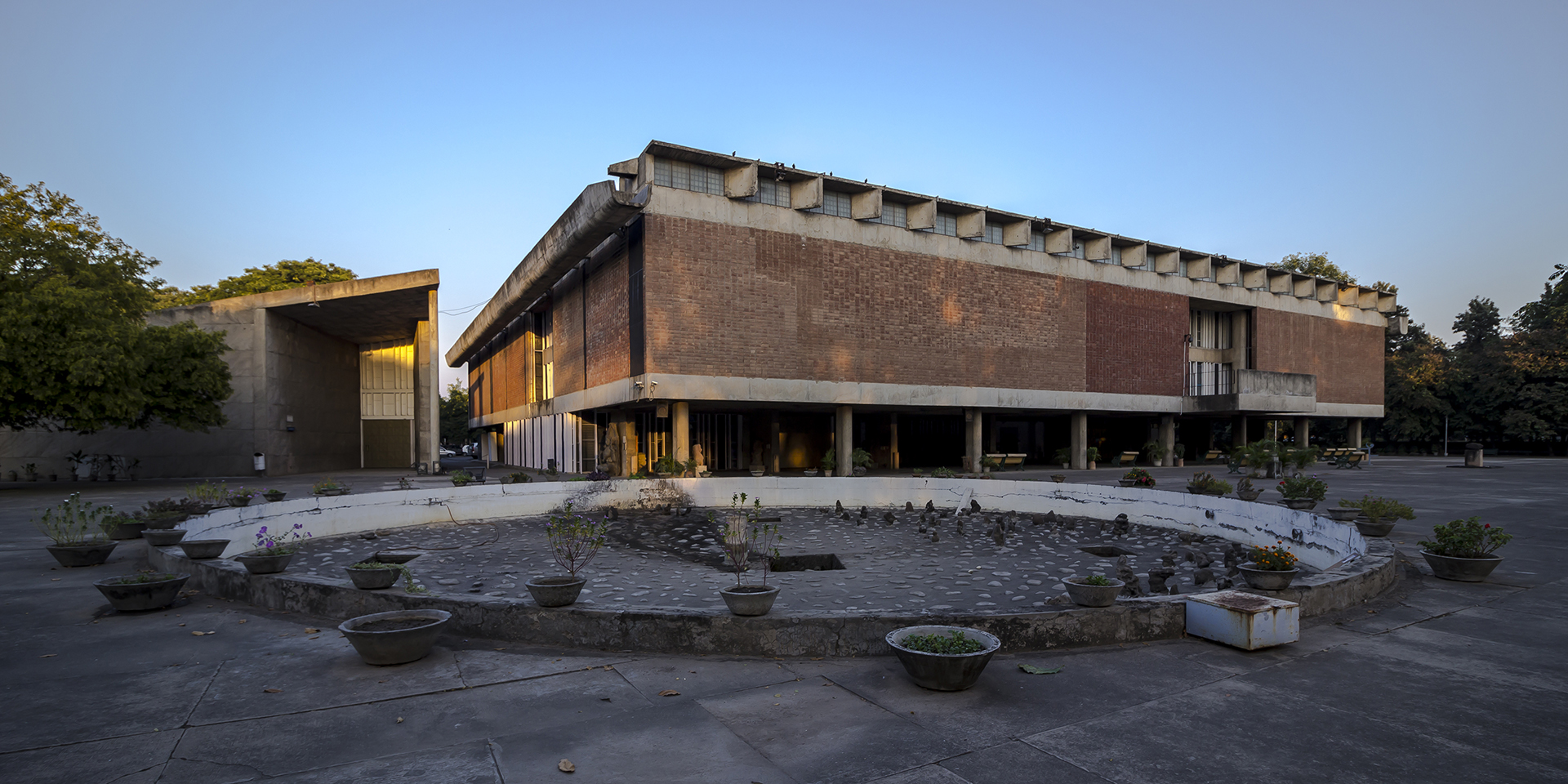
Government Museum and Art Gallery, Chandigarh

The building is divided into three levels. The first level is 33,000 sq ft comprising the Deputy Curator's office, museum shop, reception, textile section, child art gallery, exhibition hall, reserve collection stores, conservation laboratory and auditorium. Level 2 is 23,000 sq ft and comprises exhibition space for sections on Gandhara sculpture, Indian miniature paintings, stone and metal sculpture, coins and Indian contemporary art. Level 3 is 6,500 sq ft and has the library, chairman's room, and Gandhara sculptures’ reserve collection store.

The museum serves as a means of repository of the cultural history of the region. It is open to public from Tuesday to Sunday, from 10:00 AM to 4:40 PM, and is closed on Monday and national holidays. The entry ticket is ₹10 and camera ticket is ₹5. It has free entry for organised school groups and senior citizens. Facilities such as wheelchairs for the physically challenged are also provided. The auditorium is available at low fees for cultural and educational events as it also serves as the exhibition hall for temporary exhibitions for artists.

== Collection ==
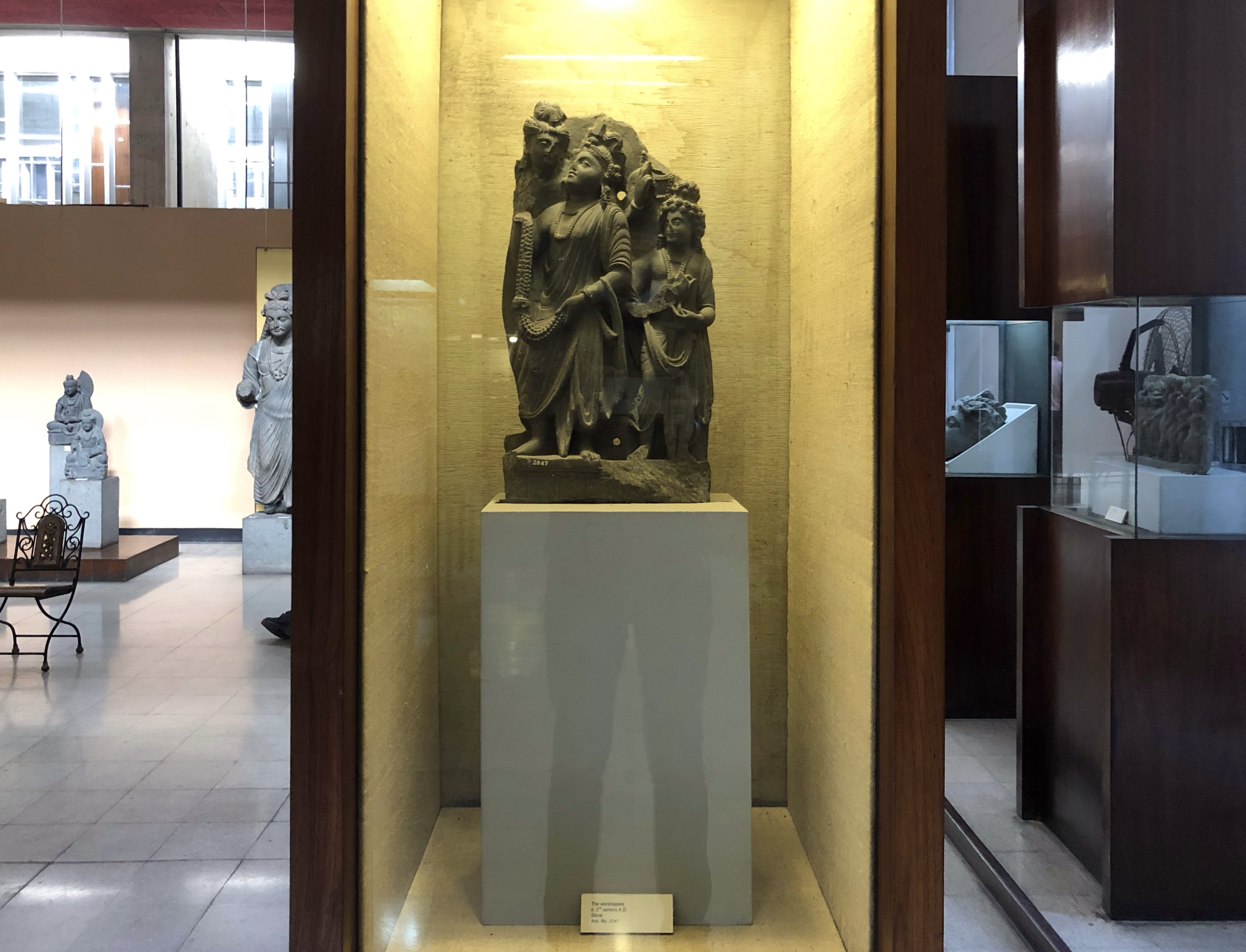
Gandhara Art Gallery of Chandigarh's Government Museum and Art Gallery

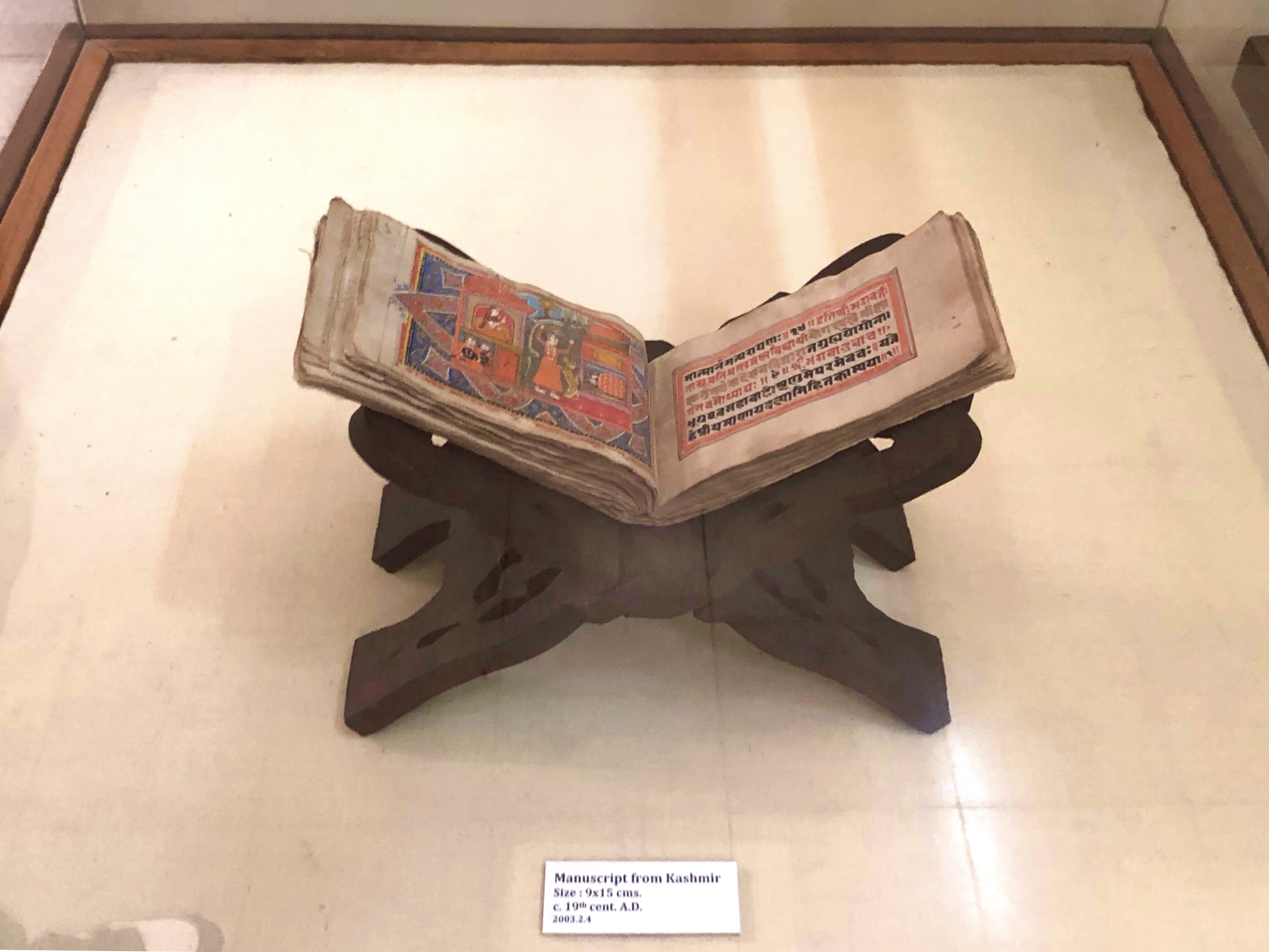
19th century manuscript from Kashmir

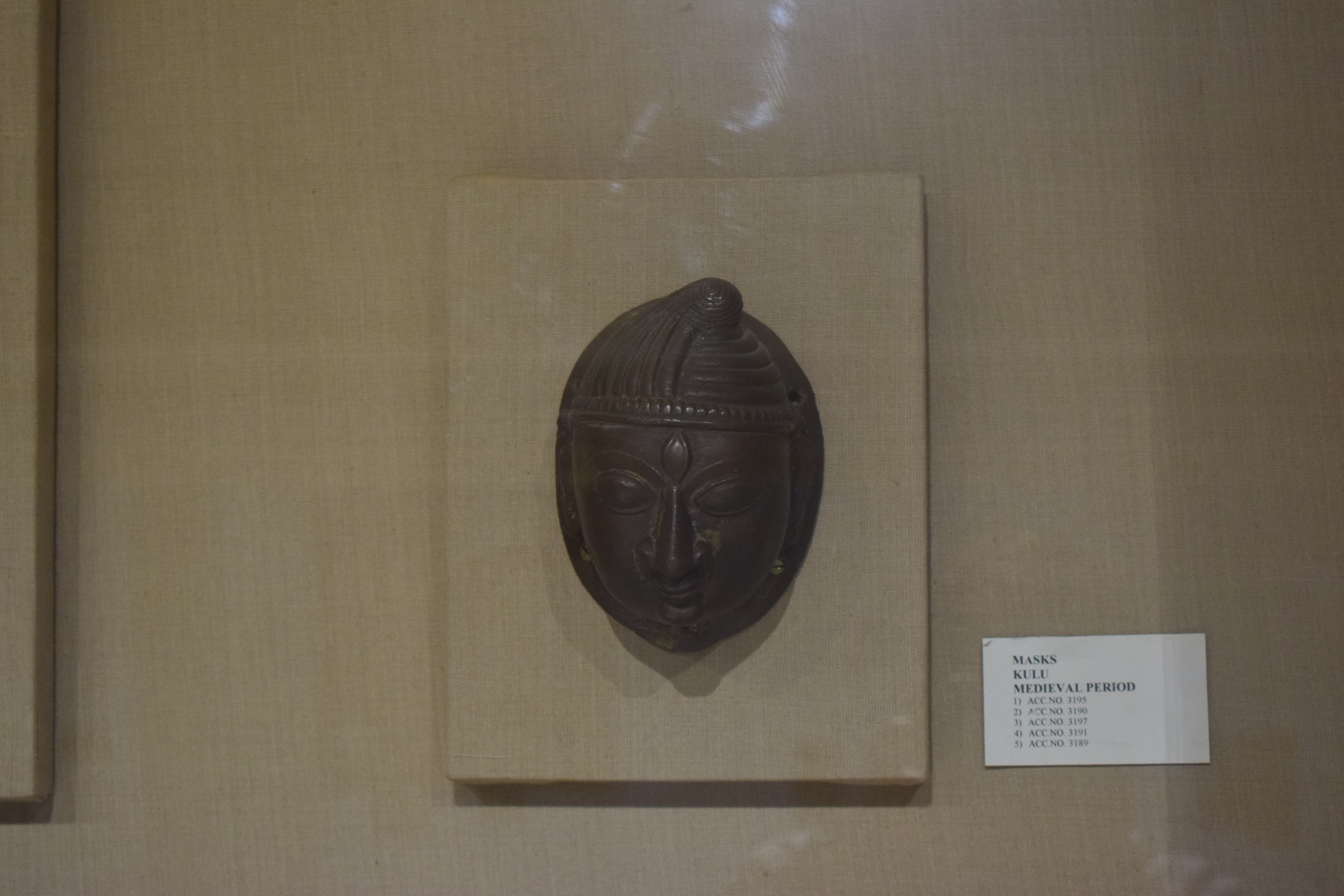
One of the Kullu Masks at the Museum

The beginning of the collection can be traced to the partition of India in 1947 when 40% of the collection of the Central Museum, Lahore became the share of the country. A significant part of this share was the Gandhara sculptures. The collections received in April 1949 from Pakistan were first housed in Amritsar, then Shimla, Patiala and were finally shifted to Chandigarh upon the inauguration of the museum in 1968. Over some time, Dr. M. S. Randhawa added Pahari miniature paintings, modern and Indian contemporary art, so that by the time the collection was displayed in the current building designed by Le Corbusier, it was at par with the leading museums of North India. The collection can be divided into the following categories:

=== Gandhara sculptures ===
The museum contains 627 Gandharan sculptures, all received from the Lahore museum at the time of partition. The museum has the second largest collection of such artefacts in India, after the Indian Museum in Kolkata.

The museum has many different sculptures of Buddha. In some sculptures, Buddha has long, open hair, while in some he has a moustache with curled hair lock. In earlier days the followers of Buddha used to worship symbolic representations of Buddha. These representations included representative footprint of Buddha or a Chakra. Later, when the followers wanted to portray Buddha in human form, they portrayed him in a beautiful Greek god-like form. This can be attributed to the Indo-Greek influence in that era. Artefacts from several of these different eras are presently housed at the museum.

The collection also includes sculptures of Buddhist deities such as Hariti and Panchika, including one standing image of Hariti found from Skarah Dheri, which is inscribed and dated.

=== Ancient and medieval Indian sculptures ===
The museum has some ancient terracotta heads from Akhnoor in Jammu, Ushkur in Kashmir and also some ancient figurines from Sugh in Haryana. Ancient sculptures from Sanghol in Punjab and from different sites in Haryana are also on display in the museum.

Most of the Medieval Indian sculptures of the collection of the museum are from Agroha and nearby Pinjore in Haryana and a few stray sites from Punjab, Kashmir and Himachal Pradesh, and two large-sized sculptures from peninsular India, including a large 12th-century sculpture of Jain deity Padmavati.

=== Metal sculptures ===
Early and late medieval metal sculptures from Kangra, Nepal, Tibet, and southern India are present at the museum, including both Buddhist and Hindu sculptures.

=== Miniatures ===
Miniature Pahari, Rajasthani, Sikh and Mughal paintings are displayed at the museum. The extensive collection of Pahari paintings consists primarily of Kangra paintings, with all other different schools of Pahari paintings also represented.

=== Manuscripts ===
18th and 19th century Devanagari, Gurmukhi and Persian manuscripts from Kullu, Kashmir, Rajasthan and Punjab are displayed at the museum.

=== Textiles ===
The museum has a textiles section displaying textiles from all over the Indian subcontinent, prominent among them Chamba rumals from Himachal Pradesh, Kantha of Bengal, Phulkari from Punjab, Thangkas from Tibet and Nepal.

=== Numismatics ===
Coins from various eras of Indian history are displayed, including Mauryan, Sunga, Kushan, Gupta, Ghazni, Delhi Sultanate, Mughal, Sikh, British and Princely state coins.

=== Contemporary Indian Art ===
A collection of artwork by artists such as Abanindra Nath Tagore, Akbar Padamsee, Amrita Sher-Gil, Bhupen Khakhar, Bireswar Sen, FN Souza, Jamini Roy, MF Husain, Nandalal Bose, Nicholas Roerich, OP Sharma, Raja Ravi Varma, S. G. Thakur Singh, Sobha Singh, Tyeb Mehta and many others is also present at the museum. There are also graphics and sculptural artworks in the Contemporary art section.

=== Other Artefacts ===
Other artefacts, including a Patua scroll from Bengal, specimens of metal Kullu masks, papier-mâché, and folk sculptures from Bastar, Kangra and Kullu etc., are also housed at the museum.

== Natural History Museum ==
The Natural History Museum was founded in 1973, and created by Dr. M.S. Randhawa, the first Chief Commissioner of the union territory and renowned Biologist. The museum has four major sections, focusing on earliest human settlements around the area of the city, biological evolution, dinosaurs of the Indian subcontinent, and human evolution.

== Architecture Museum ==
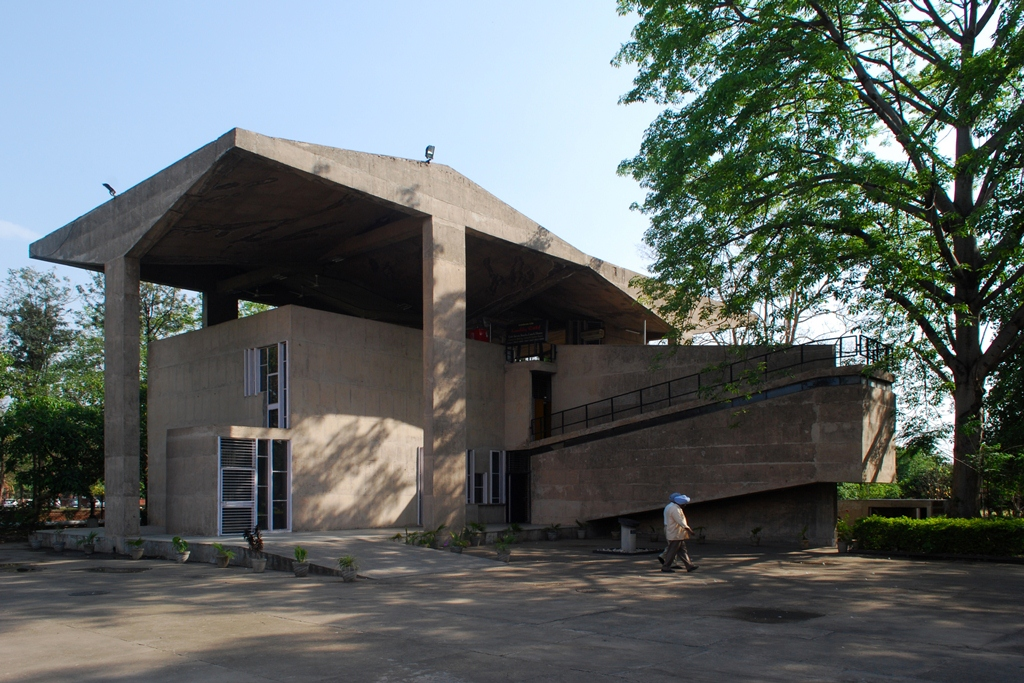
Chandigarh Architecture Museum

The Architecture Museum located across from the Art Gallery within the complex was set up in 1997. It documents, preserves and showcases rare documents, drawings, sketches and archives about the making of the city of Chandigarh. Many drawings, sketches, and other works of Maciej Nowicki, Albert Mayer, Le Corbusier, Jane Drew, Maxwell Fry and Pierre Jeanneret relating to the city of Chandigarh are preserved and displayed here. Models of the Governor's Palace and Museum of Knowledge, which were designed by Le Corbusier to be part of the Capitol Complex but never built, heritage furniture designed and used by the architects, and early maps of post-partition East Punjab and Chandigarh are also on display.

== Other wings of the museum ==
- National Gallery of Portraits, Sector 17, Chandigarh
- International Dolls Museum, Sector 23, Chandigarh

== Gallery ==
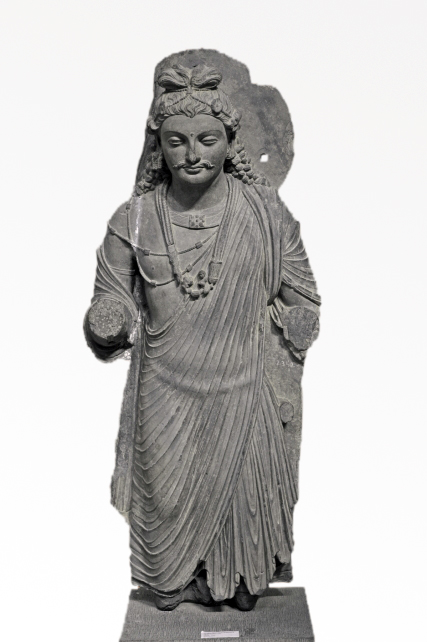
Bodhisattva Maitreya, c. 2nd century AD, Gandhara

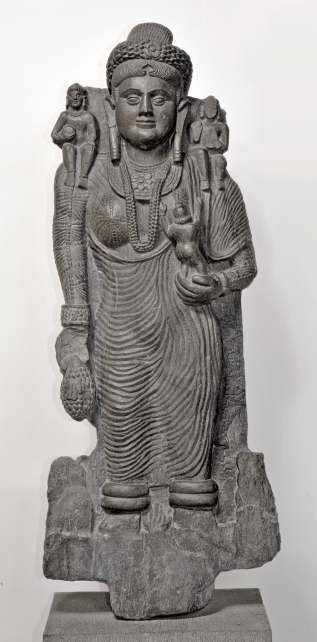
Hariti, c. 2nd century AD, Gandhara

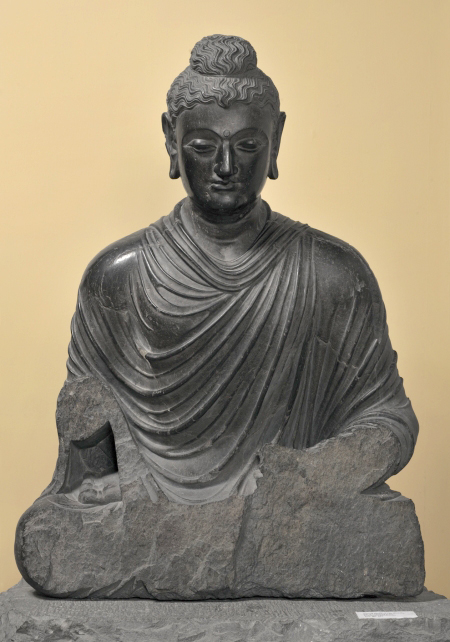
Buddha, c. 2nd century AD, Gandhara

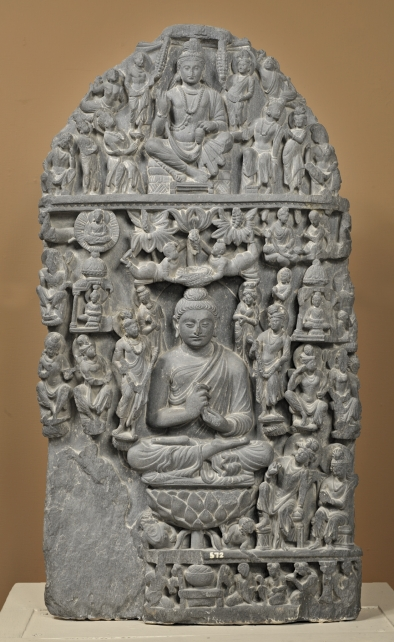
Buddha and other divinities, c. 2nd century, Gandhara

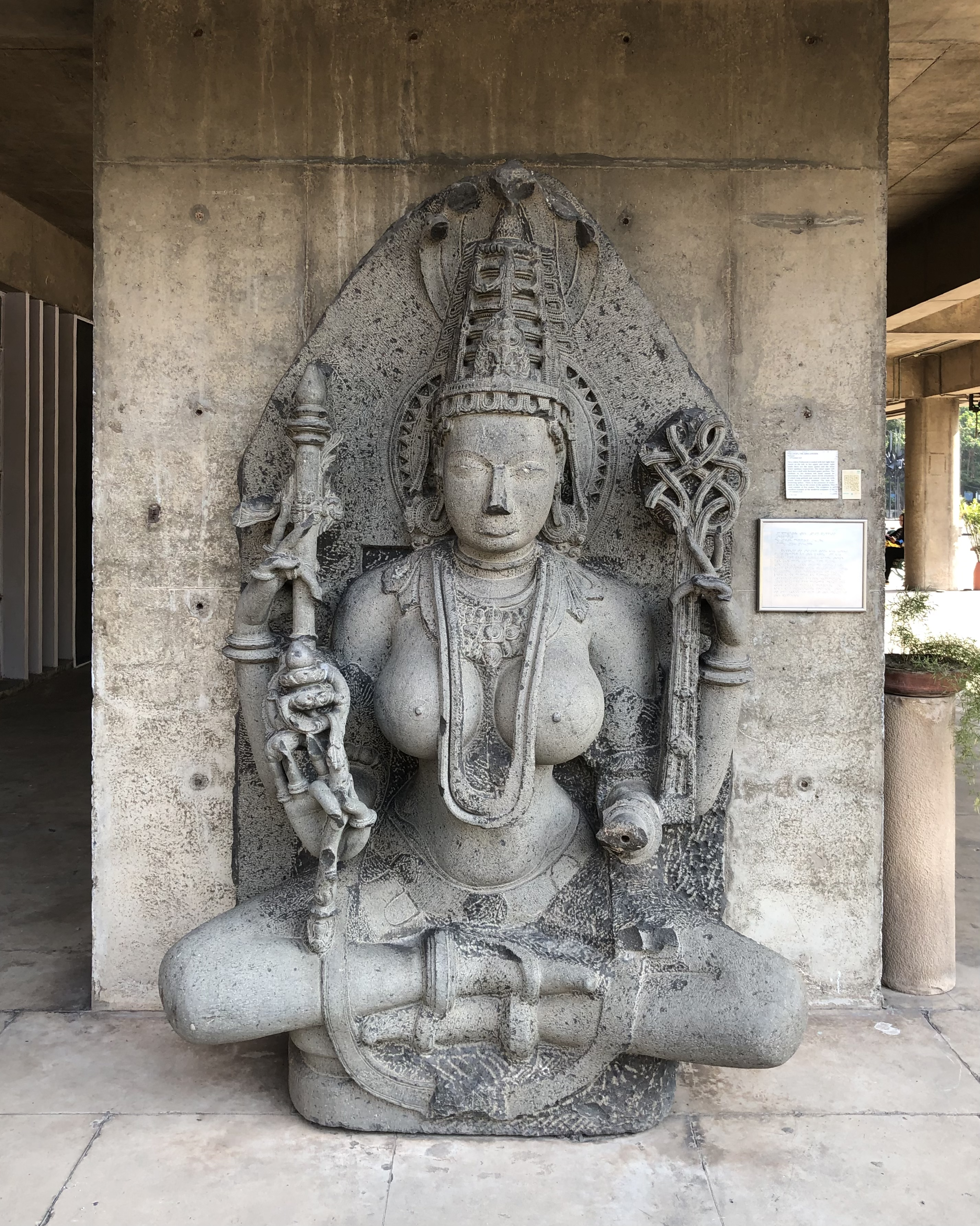
Padmavati, Chola dynasty, 13th century

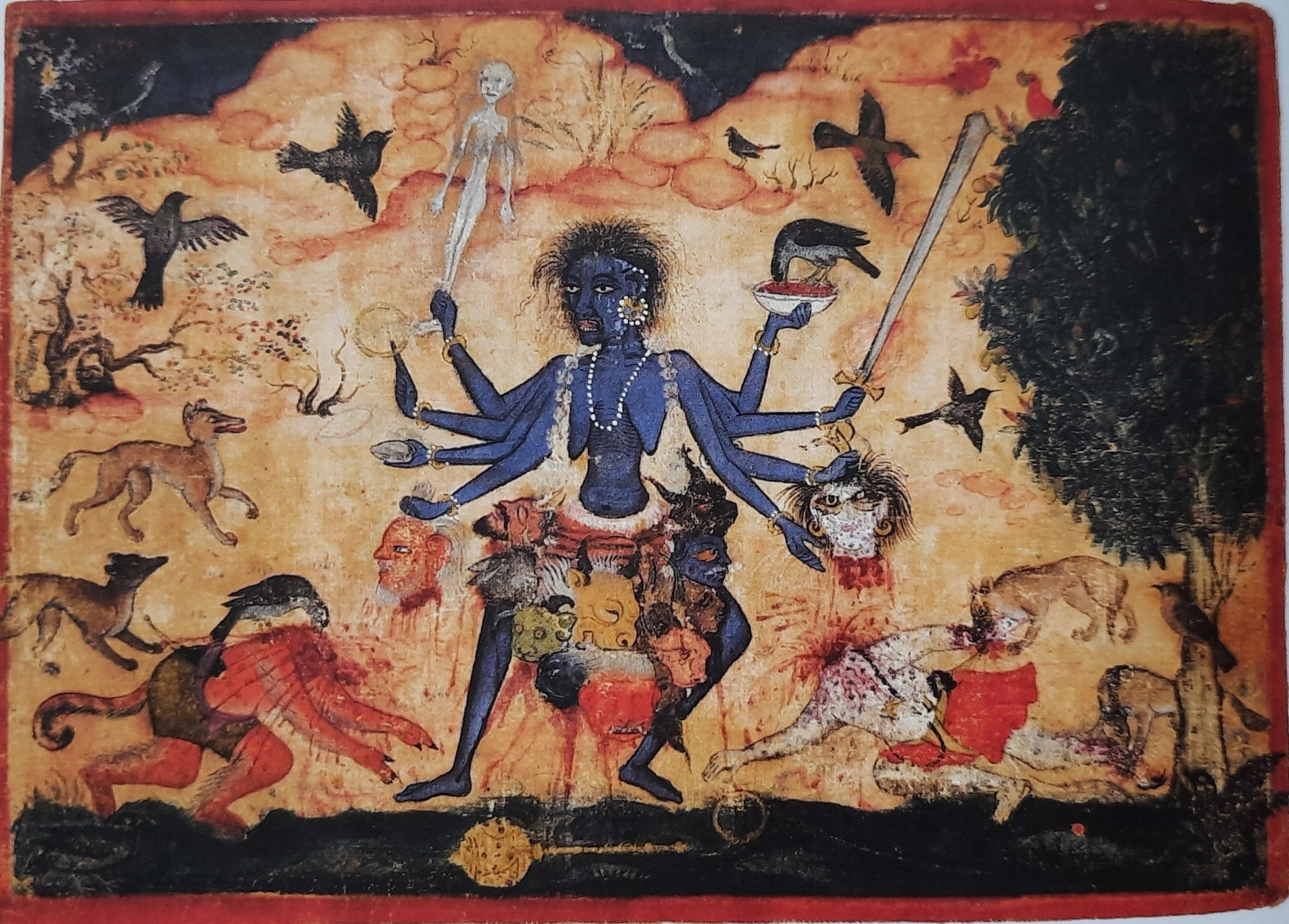
The Great Goddess in Her Chamunda Form. Provincial Mughal, possibly from a scroll of the Devi Mahatmya, c. 1565–1575

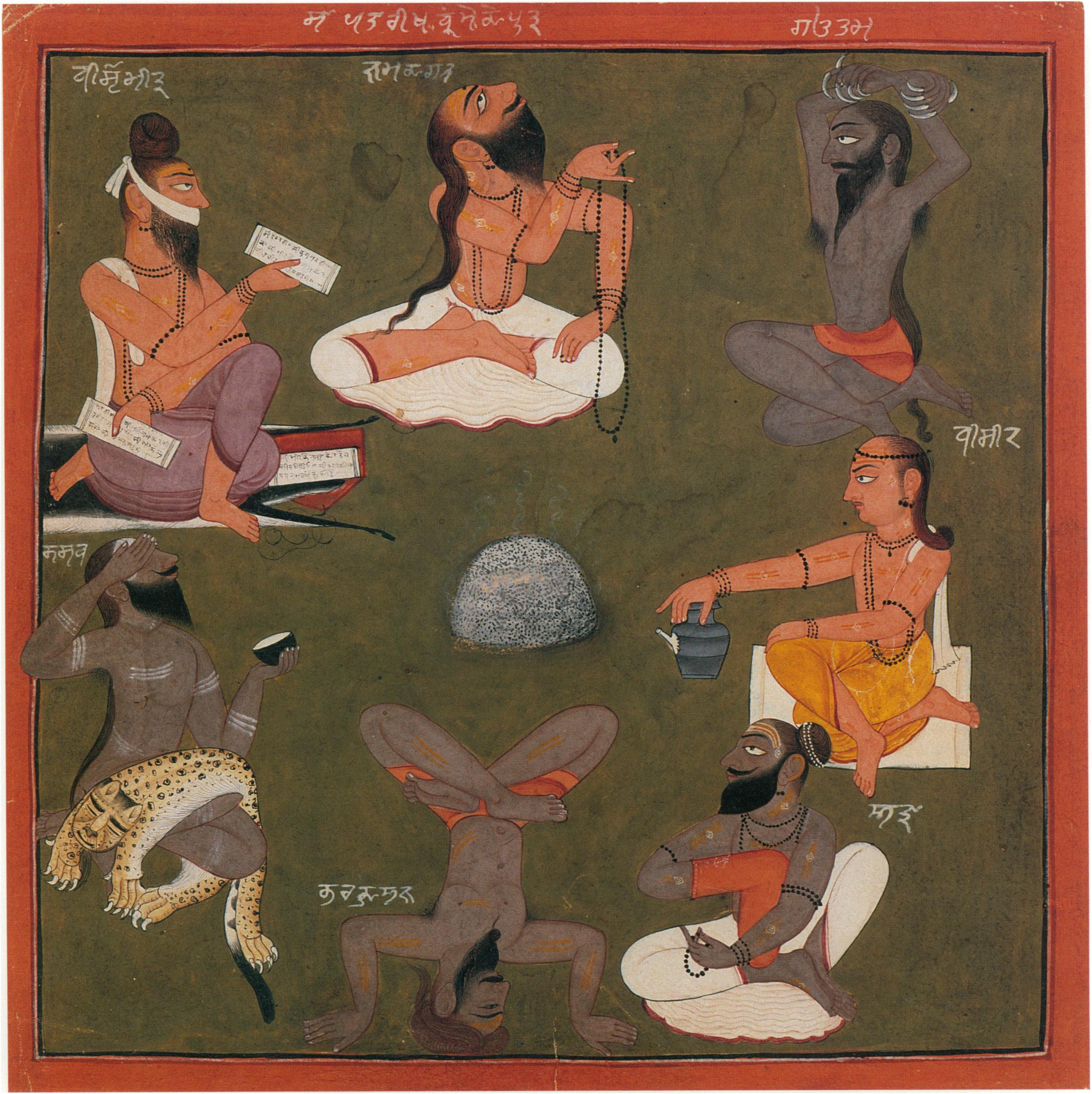
Saptarishi. Pahari painting from a Bandralta-Mankot workshop, c. 1700

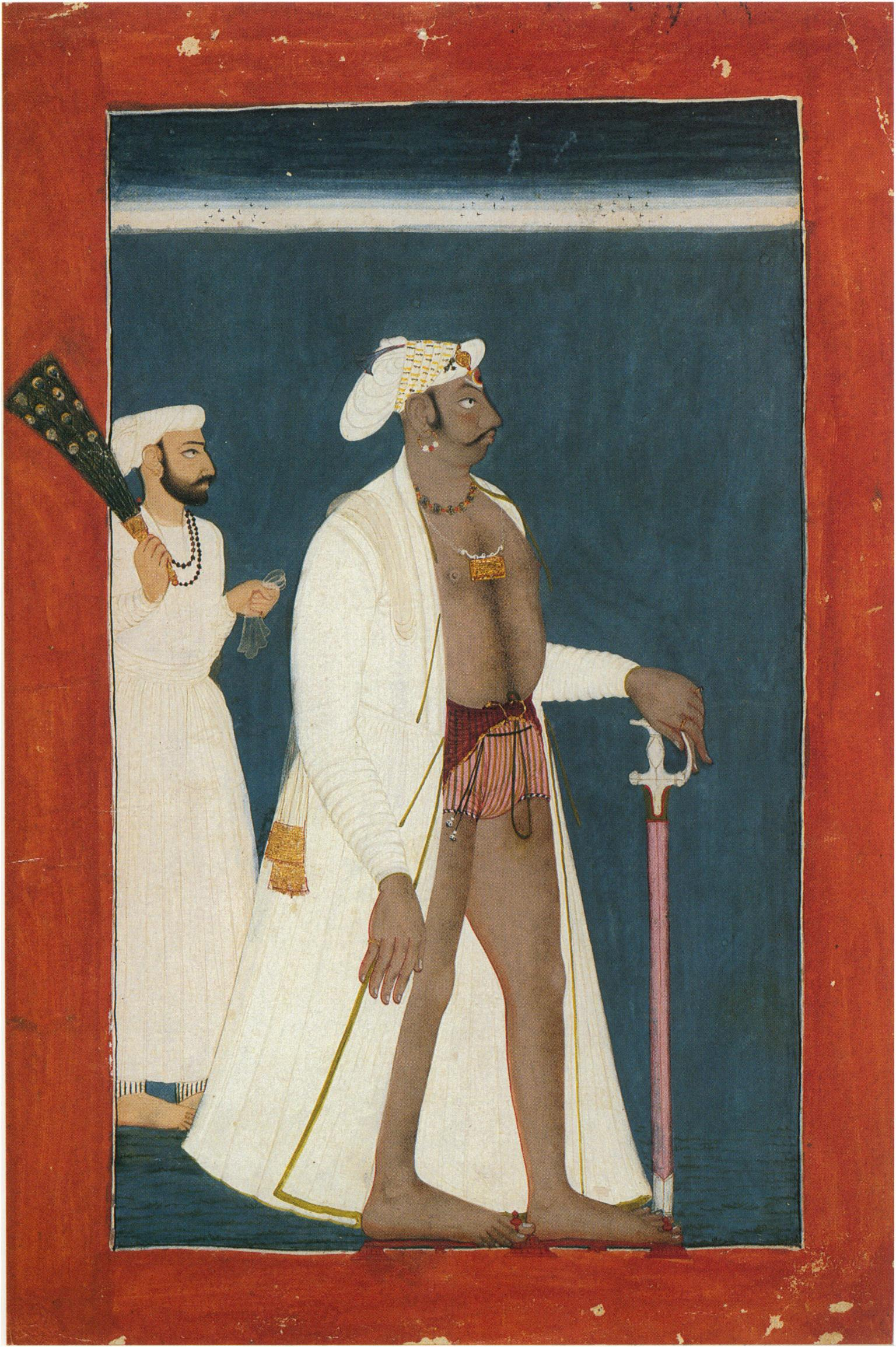
Raja Sidh Sen of Mandi - An Informal Portrait. Mandi workshop, possibly by Khinnu, c. 1700

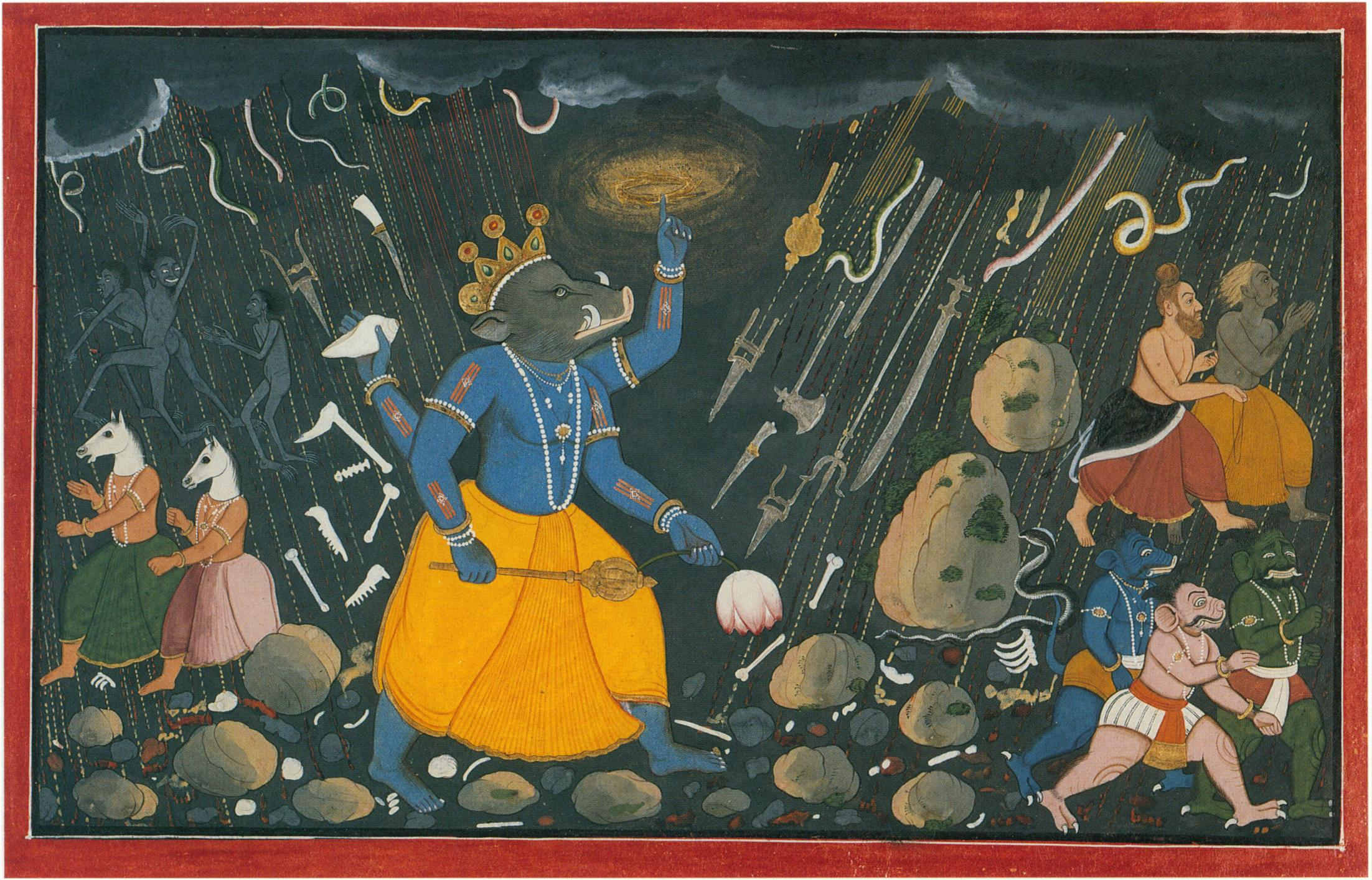
Vishnu as Varaha challenges the demon Hiranyaksha by Manaku of Guler, from Bhagavata Purana series, c. 1740

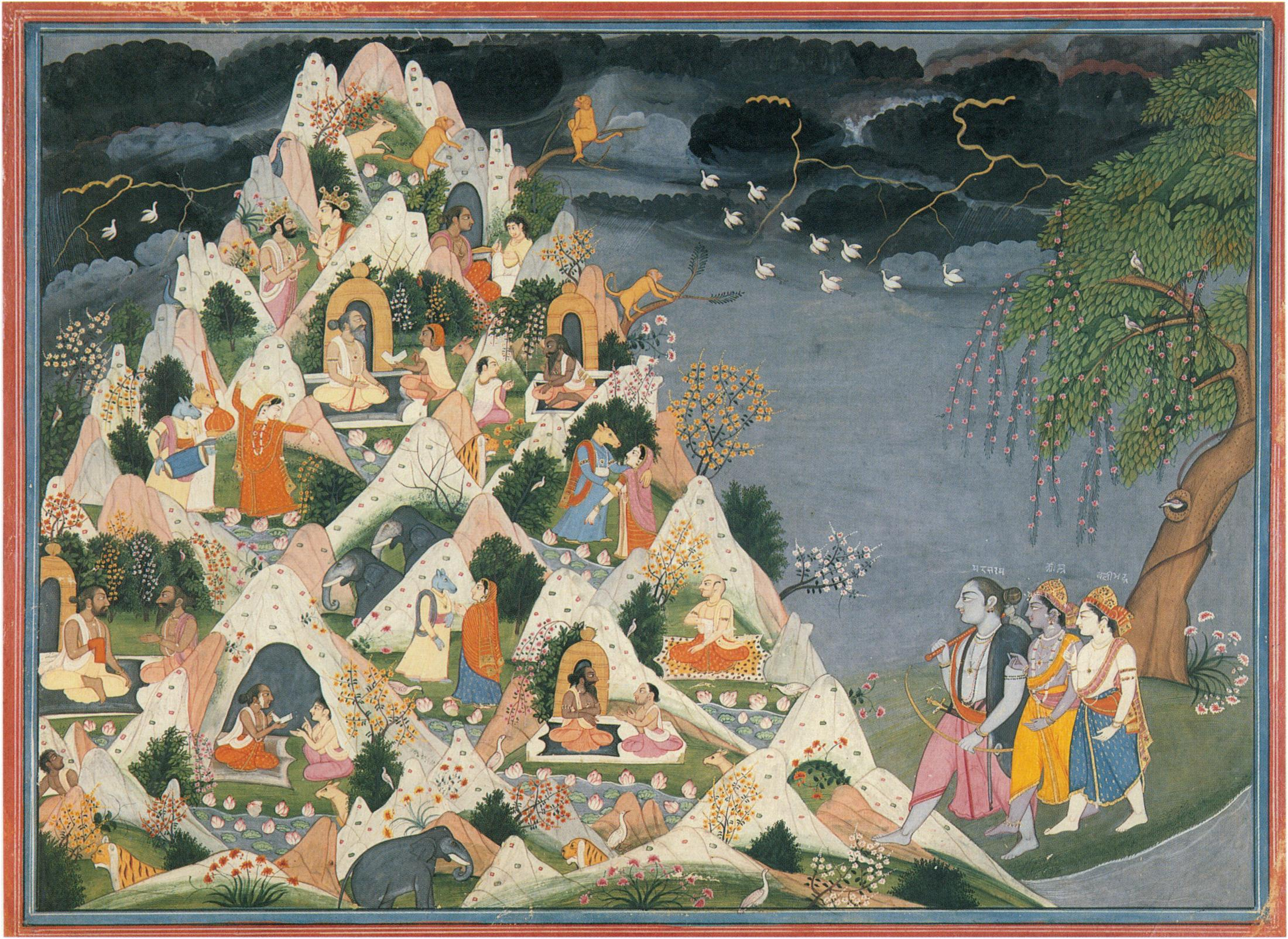
Parashurama leads Krishna and Balarama toward Mount Gomanta, from a Harivamsa series ascribed to Purkhu of Kangra, c. 1800–1815

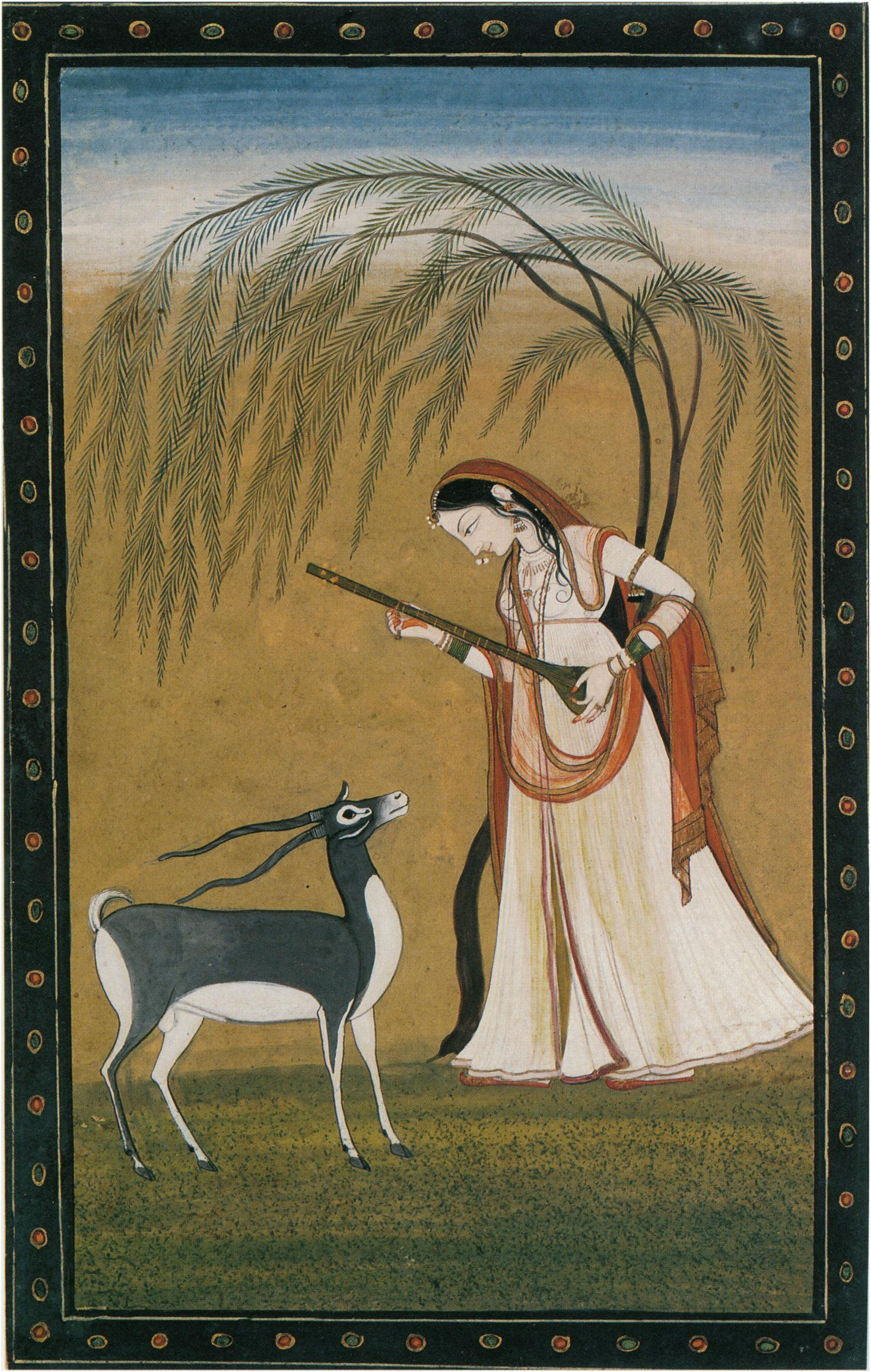
The Musical Mode: Ragini Todi. Ascribed to a Master of the Second Generation after Nainsukh, c. 1825–30
