= O. P. Sharma =

O. P. Sharma may refer to:

- O. P. Sharma (magician) (1941/1942–2022), Indian magician
- O. P. Sharma (photographer) (born 1937), Indian photographer

== See also ==
- Om Prakash Sharma (disambiguation)
