= Chameli Ki Shaadi =

1986 comedy film by Basu Chatterjee

- Directed by: Basu Chatterjee
- Screenplay by: Basu Chatterjee; Prakash Mehra
- Story by: Om Prakash Sharma
- Based on: Dhadkanein by Om Prakash Sharma
- Produced by: Ramesh Ningoo; Sushil Gaur
- Starring: Anil Kapoor; Amrita Singh; Om Prakash; Amjad Khan; Pankaj Kapoor; Annu Kapoor; Bharati Achrekar
- Cinematography: Ajay Prabhakar
- Edited by: Kamal Saigal
- Music by: Kalyanji-Anandji
- Production companies: Chetan Enterprises; Prakash Mehra Productions
- Release date: 21 February 1986
- Running time: 136 minutes
- Country: India
- Language: Hindi
- Budget: ₹1.50 crore
- Box office: ₹4.50 crore

Chameli Ki Shaadi (lit. 'Chameli's wedding') is a 1986 Indian Hindi-language comedy film directed by Basu Chatterjee, who also co-wrote it with Prakash Mehra, which in turn was adapted from Dhadkanein by Om Prakash Sharma. The film starred Anil Kapoor, Amrita Singh, Om Prakash, Amjad Khan, Pankaj Kapoor, Annu Kapoor and Bharati Achrekar. The story follows Charan (Anil Kapoor) and Chameli (Singh), who love each other, fighting their families' (Pankaj Kapoor, Annu Kapoor and Achrekar) opposition on account of belonging to different castes, with the help of Mastram (Prakash) and Harish (Khan).

Following Mehra's interest in adapting his Dhadkanein, Sharma granted him his permission to do so. Anil Kapoor was contacted by Mehra to appear in the film, which he did, despite low salary. Singh followed, and soon after regular Mehra collaborators Prakash and Khan joined the film too, along with Chatterjee collaborator Pankaj Kapoor. The music was composed by yet another Mehra collaborators Kalyanji–Anandji and the lyrics were by Mehra himself and Anjaan. The film's themes include casteism and feminism.

The film had its release on 21 February 1986 and became a box-office hit, grossing ₹4.50 crore (equivalent to ₹67 crore or US$6.9 million in 2026) against a production budget of ₹1.50 crore (equivalent to ₹22 crore or US$2.3 million in 2026). It has since gained a cult following. A Hindi-language remake has been in development hell.

== Plot ==
Charandas aka Charan, a fledgling wrestler under the tutelage of Mastram, lives with his brother and sister-in-law. According to his brother, Bhajandas, Charan should marry and start a family of his own. But Charan is determined to become a wrestler and vows to remain a bachelor until the age of 40 as per the norms of Mastram. One day, however, when Charan's sister-in-law sends him to buy coal from Kallumal's coal depot, he meets Chameli, Kallumal's daughter, and starts having second thoughts about his vow. He realizes that to marry her, he may have to leave Mastram's akhada.

Charan does so and seeks help of advocate Harish, a close friend of his brother. Harish appreciates Charan's love and is ready to help him. Anita, Chameli's best friend is also approving of their relationship. Charan confesses his love to Chameli and the couple starts to meet secretly. One day, however, a relative of Chameli, who spots the duo in a restaurant, reveal their meeting to her parents.

Chameli's family make it clear that they won't allow inter-caste marriage. Chameli is kept under house arrest and her parents decide to have her marry one of their acquaintances. Chameli's mother, Champa also calls in the help of her rogue brother Chhadam Lal aka Chhadmi.

Charan learns of these developments. He frees Chameli from her house arrest and together they go to Harish's house. Chameli's parents proceed to the place where Charan and Chameli are going to get married. Meanwhile, Bhajandas also comes with his men to disrupt the marriage. However, both of the parties arrive late, as they are legally married now. They vent their ire on Harish, who, according to them, is responsible for corrupting the couple. Harish takes Kallumal aside and explains that if the marriage is permitted by him, he will garner votes from both of the castes in the upcoming election, that he had decided to participate in, and that his son-in-law is the leader of all the young people and also has support from the akhadas, therefore guaranteeing a win.

Convinced, Kallumal relents; similarly, Harish tells Bhajandas that Kallumal is sure to win the elections, and that if Bhajandas accepts the marriage, he will get special perks, like getting coal and cement at a subsidized rate from Kallumal. Bhajandas also relents. Charan and Chameli get blessings from both of their families.

== Cast ==
- Anil Kapoor as Charandas
- Amrita Singh as Chameli
- Om Prakash as Ustad Mastram Pehelwan: Charandas' mentor
- Amjad Khan as Harish: A progressive advocate
- Pankaj Kapoor as Kallumal Koylewala: An exploitative coal trader, and Chameli's father
- Annu Kapoor as Chhadam Lal: Chameli's maternal uncle
- Bharati Achrekar as Champa: Chameli's ever-weeping mother
- Satyen Kappu as Bhajandas: Charandas' brother
- Ram Sethi as Nathulal
- Tabassum as Bhajandas' wife
- Nandita Thakur as Nirmala: Harish's wife
- Jayshree T. as Gulabo
- Ghanshyam as Fatchat
- Rupini as Anita: Chameli's friend (credited as Komal Mahuvakar)
- Shail Chaturvedi as Lachchuram Kaphanchi

== Production ==
In the early 1980s, Om Prakash Sharma was invited to Mumbai by one of Prakash Mehra's financiers to discuss adapting Dhadkanein (lit. 'Heartbeats') to a film. Sharma granted them his permission, but refused to travel. After some time, Basu Chatterjee, who had planned to adapt it during the making of his previous film Ek Ruka Hua Faisla, paid Sharma a visit, revealing to him that he was the one who was going to direct the film adaptation. Chatterjee then went on to narrate the script. Sharma was pleased with the idea as he appreciated Chatterjee.

In Dhadkanein, Khalifa Mastram was a practising celibate and a misogynist, who takes Charandas under his wing and inspires him to take a vow of celibacy. In the film, this character was renamed Ustad Mastram Pehelwan. In the novel, Kallumal was described as about four and a half feet tall, dark skinned, with a round-shaped body, who had failed the sixth grade.

According to Anil Kapoor, Mehra contacted him to star in the film. When Kapoor went to Mehra, he realised that Mehra wasn't going to direct the film, and that he won't be able to pay much. Kapoor agreed to Mehra's ₹1 lakh (equivalent to ₹15 lakh or US$15,000 in 2026) pay. When Amrita Singh, Kapoor's Saaheb (1985) co-star, was asked for the film, she grew excited based on the title alone. Chatterjee told her that she'd only get ₹1 lakh (US$1,000). She replied that she wanted to get the same amount as Kapoor. Chatterjee acquiesced; little did she know that Kapoor too had signed the film for ₹1 lakh (US$1,000). Becoming aware of that, she scolded him on the phone. Kapoor and Singh went on to collaborate again in Thikana (1987).

Om Prakash, Amjad Khan, Ram Sethi and Kalyanji-Anandji were regular collaborators of Prakash Mehra, although none of them had worked with Chatterjee before. Noting the similarities between Uncle Tom in Chatterjee's Baton Baton Mein (1979) and Harish in Chameli Ki Shaadi, Anirudha Bhattacherjee speculated on the possibility that had not David, who played Uncle Tom, passed away in 1982, he would've been cast as Harish. Khan previously collaborated with Mehra on Muqaddar Ka Sikandar (1978) and Laawaris (1981). Pankaj Kapoor had just collaborated with Chatterjee on Ek Ruka Hua Faisla (1986), based on a show of the same name (in which he also starred), itself based on 12 Angry Men (1957). Kapoor was only four years older than Singh, who played his daughter. He had played an older character (a sexagenarian) in Ek Ruka Hua Faisla too. Since Kapoor himself hailed from a small town, he was confident that he could do justice to the character.

Those days, Hindi films didn't use scripts, and the writers used to write dialogues hastily on the set. But Chatterjee preferred a full script beforehand. Chatterjee reimagined the source material Delhi small town as a Bombay one entirely on studio set. Mehra didn't object spending on set construction. Although the fight scene between Anil Kapoor and Annu Kapoor was shot in a real bar, which doesn't exist now. According to Chatterjee, Mehra neither interfered with his work nor offered suggestions. Bharati Achrekar, who was also a singer, recalled how the shooting was "great fun," crediting Singh as "very cooperative" despite being a star, and that she, Achrekar, had a "great time" working with Khan. Acoording to her, him being fond of her singing, he'd ask her "to sing every time" they met.

=== Soundtrack ===
The music was composed by Kalyanji–Anandji and the lyrics were by Mehra and Anjaan. In addition to starring in the film, Anil Kapoor also lend his voice to "Chameli Ki Shaadi."

Song	Singer
"Peena Haraam Hai, Na Peelana Haraam Hai"	Kishore Kumar, Alka Yagnik
"Chameli Ki Shaadi"	Anil Kapoor
"Mohabbat Ke Dushman"	Anwar
"Tu Jahan Bhi Chalega"	Asha Bhosle
"Utar Aayi Akhade Mein"	Asha Bhosle

== Themes ==
Arushi Jain termed the film "light, despite presenting a commentary on an issue as serious as the caste system in India," pointing out how "Kallumal is not as much of an evil dad, his Charlie Chaplin-esque moustache makes him fun to watch." Anirudha Bhattacherjee went so far as to label him "soft rebel," and how he "reasoned out with his wife in support of their daughter, despite mouse-like timidity." "Kallumal was a doting dad who sent Chameli to an English-medium school and gives her money for golgappas," per Sulagana Biswas. According to Scroll, the film was a parody of the traditions of the north Indian caste Hindus who do not educate their girls. Champa, for example, was illiterate. The parody being that Kallumal himself was a sixth grade dropout, while Chameli had at least reached the eighth grade. Despite its lightness, Devesh Sharma asserts that, "the film made a stand against casteism," and that caste politics was "the villain of the piece." Pointing out the scene where Harish tells Kallumal that having Charandas as son-in-law would help him politically, and Bhajandas that having a politician for a relative would help him have clout, Biswas said that, "the film, like Harish, knows only naked self-interest can dilute India’s obsession with caste."

Chameli selling a sack of coal to Charan at lower prices was interpreted as her first revolt against her father's wishes, as he wanted to sell it for more. Chameli doesn't pressurise Charan to earn more money than he could be capable of, she just wants to love her as is. When Charan and Chameli goes on a date, Chameli offers to pay the restaurant bill herself, going against the norm of the man paying the bill, particularly in the 1980s India. Charan breaking his vow of bachelorhood was seen as his freedom from the bonds that come against love. Chameli doesn't wait for her father's permission to marry, because she knows that society may be against her, but law is on her side. The film shows that instead of material things, and even maturity, in order to love, one need only have courage.

It has been called a feminist film, and Chameli has been called a feminist heroine. Jain said that instead of being a damsel in distress, "she is feisty, lively, intelligent, takes her own decisions, acts upon them and never gives up, something you won’t expect from an 80s Bollywood heroine." Similarly, Amit Karn described her as "assertive, outspoken and headstrong." Biswas called her unapologetic, pointing out the scene where she beat her uncle who was thinking of killing Charan.

== Release ==
Chameli Ki Shaadi had its release on 21 February 1986. The film was a box-office hit, grossing ₹4.50 crore (equivalent to ₹67 crore or US$6.9 million in 2026) against a production budget of ₹1.50 crore (equivalent to ₹22 crore or US$2.3 million in 2026).

According to Runa Chakraborty Paunksnis, the film failed to "break the traditional pattern of narrating the story from a Brahmanical patriarchal perspective." Arushi Jain, meanwhile, acknowledging the story as clichéd, nonetheless went on to praise the hilarious dialogues.

Anil Kapoor's performance was praised by Sulagana Biswas, Jai Prakash Chouksey, Rumi Jaffery and Scroll as effortless and hilarious. Though, Devesh Sharma was more muted, merely calling him "good." Singh's performance was praised by multiple reviewers, with Biswas and Scroll deeming her a revelation. (Note: Attributed to multiple references) Kapoor and Singh's chemistry was praised by Sharma and Jaffery, with the former writing that their chemistry helped to elevate the film. Prakash's performance was praised by Biswas. Khan's performance was praised by multiple reviewers. He "proves yet again that his acting skills extend beyond villainy," wrote Scroll. (Note: Attributed to multiple references) Pankaj Kapoor's performance was praised by Biswas and Jain, with the latter finding him "fun to watch." Annu Kapoor's performance was praised by Anirudha Bhattacherjee. Achrekar's performance was praised by Biswas and Bhattacherjee, with the latter saying that she did a "brilliant job."

The characters were praised by Jain, particularly Chameli. The humour was praised by Sampada Sharma and Scroll as effortless and noteworthy. Biswas compared the film favourably to Karma and Nagina, two of the highest-grossing Hindi films of 1986. She also found Chameli to be a precursor to the "feisty small-town" girls that Hindi films "discovered" in the mid-2010s. Similarly, Scroll saw the film as anticipating social comedies "set in small towns and featuring quirky characters." The film has since gained a cult following.

== Remake ==
Chameli Ki Shaadi was remade as a 1989 Tamil-language film, Mappillai, starring Rajinikanth. Reportedly, Shah Rukh Khan also considered a remake. In early 2016, Radhika Rao and Vinay Sapru expressed interest in a remake with Sonakshi Sinha as Chameli. In mid 2016, Diljit Dosanjh and Parineeti Chopra were considered for a remake by producers Deepak Mukut and Madhu Mantena, with Rohit Jugraj as director. In 2020, Sara Ali Khan was offered to star in a remake, although she was reportedly cautious regarding whether she would do justice to the part that was originally played by her mother, Amrita Singh.

== See also ==
- List of cult films
- List of Hindi films of 1986
