= Om Prakash Sharma (writer) =

- Born: 25 December 1924; Meerut, United Provinces, British India
- Died: 14 October 1998 (aged 73); Meerut, Uttar Pradesh, India
- Citizenship: Indian
- Occupations: Writer, novelist, Hindi writer
- Writing career
- Notable works: साँझ का सूरज (Sanjh Ka Suraj), नीली घोड़ी का सवार (Nili Ghori Ka Sawar), पिशाच सुन्दरी (Pishach Sundari), फिर आया तूफ़ान (Phir Aya Tufan), दूसरा ताज महल (Dusra Taj Mahal), अपने देश का अजनबी (Apne Desh Ka Ajnabi)
- Website: omprakashsharma.com

Om Prakash Sharma (25 December 1924 – 14 October 1998) popularly known as Janpriya Lekhak Om Prakash Sharma, is recognized as one of the foremost and most talented writers of detective fiction in Hindi after Devaki Nandan Khatri. He has more than 450 Hindi detective novels to his credit.

== Early life ==
Sharma was born in Meerut, Uttar Pradesh, as eldest son to Shiv Charan and Devi. He later moved to Delhi. He has two younger brothers namely, Jai Prakash Sharma and Gauri Shankar Sharma. He was employed with the Delhi Cloth Mill (DCM) and lived in a rented house in Pahari Dhiraj. Later settled in Meerut and having four sons namely Mahendra Sharma, Surendra Sharma, Virendra Sharma.

== Career ==
A very thoughtful, erudite mind and a person of moral values, he worked for DCM and participated in trade union activities. Inspired from socialist and communist views, he joined the Indian Freedom Struggle and was jailed twice by the then British Raj for his involvement in the freedom movement. It was during this period that he started writing. His passion for writing developed from his obsession with reading. Several times in his creations, he has portrayed his rebellious attitude towards religious and social orthodoxy.

He wrote many short stories for small pocket book organizations as well as his own venture Delhi Pustak Sadan, with his friends and associates.

Along with detective novels, he also wrote books of social relevance and historical inscriptions. His first popular novel was 'Saanjh Ka Sooraj' based on the 1857 Revolution in the period of last Mughal emperor Bahadur Shah Zafar. In a short span, the talent bore fruit. His novels had created a momentum in the contemporary readers. His readership crossed the boundaries and had admirers in other countries. Late in 1964, he shifted back to Meerut, his native place, to write in peace. He died on 14 October 1998 after prolonged illness.

== Writing style ==
Sharma was wholeheartedly in awe of Sharat Chandra Chatterji's writings. Chatterji's writing style and the depiction of his characters had an immense impact on Sharma. Though, Om Prakash Sharma wrote populist detective novels, he had the acumen of writing good quality contemporary and historical literature as well as poetry. He had keen interest in Indian classical music. He was very fond of Nirguni bhajans hymns recital by Kumar Gandharva and many more Indian Classical Singers.

What distinguished him was his manner of creating a suspense and interest in the script through actual incidents on one hand and imagination on the other, thereby creating a curiosity in the readers mind as to what shall happen next. The main characters of his writing include Rajesh, Jagat, Jayant, Jagan, Gopali, Bandook Singh, Chief Chakravarti, Bhuvan, Father William and many more. Rajesh was considered to be the human face of his writings, who many times on several occasions was preempted as the real time character.

He authored some four or five novels featuring 'Bhootnath' as his tribute to the legendary Devaki Nandan Khatri. He also named his imaginary colony, official residence of personnel of 'Kendriya Khufia Vibhag' as 'Bhootnath Colony'.

In his social attributions, he wrote against social oppression. In his historical inscriptions, 'Neeli Ghodi Ka Sawar', and 'Phir Aaya Toofan' were very popular.

After writing for many publishing houses, he started to write for his own publication Janpriya Prakashan ". . Many of his novels were huge hit at a time, when television as a medium of entertainment was not so common. Though, he received several offers to write for Hindi feature films, he denied, as he apprehended the material life and loved his slow peaceful but creative life.

Many fake novels were also published in his name as 'Vikrant' being its main character.

== Adaptation ==
Film producer Prakash Mehra's financer, Satyen Pal Chaudhary from Meerut, decided to make a film on his novel Dhadkan and invited him to Mumbai. He denied, but gave permission for the film since the film was being directed by Basu Chatterjee whom he highly admired. Chatterjee came to Meerut and narrated him the screenplay. The feature film Chameli Ki Shaadi with Anil Kapoor in the lead role was made based on his novel and is often broadcast on TV channels.

Many more detective writers after his writing emerged like Surender Mohan Pathak, Ved Prakash Sharma, Ved Prakash Kamboj, etc. and to many of whom he was a friend, philosopher and guide.

Throughout, his writings have served not only the purpose of entertainment but also of instructing, informing, or improving his readership by commenting on the current situation and offering a moral message for his readers.
