= Om Prakash Sharma (artist) =

- Born: Om Prakash Sharma; 14 December 1932 (age 93); Bawal, Haryana, India
- Education: Master of Fine Arts
- Alma mater: Meerut College; Delhi Polytechnic; Art Students League of New York; Columbia University
- Known for: Painting
- Spouse: Savitri Sharma
- Awards: National Award for Painting
- Website: Official website

Om Prakash Sharma (born 14 December 1932) is an Indian painter, visual artist, professor, writer and sitarist based in New Delhi, India. He was bestowed with National Award for Painting of Lalit Kala Akademi in 1969, by the President of India. Sharma has won All India Fine Arts and Crafts Society's Annual Art Exhibitions thrice in 1966, 1967 and 1969, and has been awarded with multiple awards at various state exhibitions.

== Early life and education ==
Sharma was born in 1932, in Bawal, Haryana. He attended Meerut College where he graduated in drawing and paintings in 1951. Sharma earned The National Diploma in Fine Arts in 1958 from Delhi Polytechnic with First Class and Distinction. From 1964 to 1966, Sharma attended Columbia University and Art Students League of New York as a Fulbright scholar where he completed his postgraduate studies in Fine Arts and Art History.

== Career ==
=== Art educator ===
After completing his graduation in 1951, Sharma joined D.A.V. School, Paharganj, New Delhi, as an art teacher, where he worked for five years. In 1956, Sharma was appointed as senior art teacher at Government Model School, Ludlow Castle, Delhi where he worked till 1961. From 1961 to 1981, Sharma served as the head of the art department at School of Planning and Architecture, Delhi. In 1981, Sharma was appointed as the Dean at College of Art, Delhi where he served till 1992.

=== Artist ===
Om Prakash Sharma's career as an artist spans over six decades. His work as an artist has been centered around New Delhi. Sharma is known primarily as a practitioner of a uniquely Indian visual style. Sharma started his career as an artist in 1956 during annual exhibition at All India Fine Arts and Crafts Society in Delhi. His paintings has been exhibited at over 100 solo and group exhibition. His art works has been part of permanent collections at various art galleries and museums including Berlin Museum, Academy of Fine Arts Museum, Moscow and Darat al Funun, Amman, Jordan. He is regarded as one of the founders of the Neo-Tantra art movement.

Sharma started playing sitar in 1956 when he came in contact with Pandit Ravi Shankar, who helped him in identifying the traditional iconography of different ragas which inspired him to paint 25 Ragmala paintings in water colors. Influence of music has always inspired visual rhythms of Sharma's work. Sharma has written about art in several art magazines and art columns. He has been an invited keynote speaker at various public talks organized by art societies, museums and institutions in India and abroad, on his paintings in context of contemporary art and the tradition of tantra art. He had also held positionof advisor to various art committees such Boards of education, Parliament House Complex, HUDCO, Urban Arts Commission and several University Counsels. Sharma has also authored several books including Art in Art in 1994, Om Prakash - Forty Years 1958 - 1998 in 1999 and Om Prakash- Sixty Years 1951 - 2012 in 2013.

Sharma has received several awards, including three first prizes in Annual Art Exhibitions of the AIFACS, New Delhi. He was awarded the National Award for Painting of Lalit Kala Akademi in 1969. He was also awarded the Delhi State Award from the Chief Minister of Delhi in 2003. He holds Honorary membership of Russian Academy of Arts, Moscow. In 2008, Sharma received Life Time Achievement Award from ART MALL, New Delhi.

== Awards and accolades ==
- 1966- First prize at All India Fine Arts and Crafts Society's Annual Art Exhibitions
- 1967- First prize at All India Fine Arts and Crafts Society's Annual Art Exhibitions
- 1969- First prize at All India Fine Arts and Crafts Society's Annual Art Exhibitions
- 1969 - National Award for Painting of Lalit Kala Akademi.
- 2003 - Delhi State Award from the Chief Minister of Delhi.
- Honorary membership of Russian Academy of Arts, Moscow.
- Lifetime Achievement Award by ART MALL, New Delhi in 2008

== Solo exhibitions ==
- 1958 - Hotel Rex, Delhi
- 1959 - AIFACS, New Delhi
- 1959 - AIFACS, New Delhi
- 1961 - AIFACS, New Delhi
- 1963 - AIFACS, New Delhi
- 1963 - Ashoka Gallery, Calcutta
- 1964 - Kumar Gallery, New Delhi
- 1965 - Artistica Gallery, Long Island, USA
- 1965 - Duncan Gallery, New York City, USA
- 1967 - Kumar Gallery, New Delhi
- 1968 - Kumar Gallery, New Delhi
- 1969 - Kumar Gallery, New Delhi
- 1970 - Kumar Gallery, New Delhi
- 1971 - Gallery Chanakya, New Delhi
- 1972 - Gallery Chanakya, New Delhi
- 1973 - Fair Field University Gallery, Connecticut USA
- 1973 - St. John the Divine Gallery, New York, USA
- 1974 - Gallery Chanakya, New Delhi
- 1975 - Gallery Chanakya, New Delhi
- 1975 - Pundole Art Gallery, Mumbai
- 1976 - Solar Gallery, New York, USA
- 1977 - Kumar Gallery, New Delhi
- 1978 - Pundole Art Gallery, Mumbai
- 1980 - Lalit Kala Gallery, New Delhi
- 1981 - Ancient Currents Gallery, San Francisco, USA
- 1985 - Dhoomimal Art Gallery, New Delhi
- 1986 - Gallery Chemould, Mumbai
- 1988 - Gallery Aurobindo, New Delhi
- 1988 - Shridharani Gallery, New Delhi
- 1989 - Asia & Pacific Museum, Warsaw, Poland
- 1989 - Sian Gallery, Pusan, South Korea
- 1990 - Shridharani Gallery, New Delhi
- 1990 - International Friendship House, Moscow and Riga
- 1991 - Shridharani Gallery, New Delhi
- 1991 - World Wide Gallery, New York, USA
- 1991 - Gallery Roman Rolland, New Delhi
- 1992 - Hotel Hyatt Regency, New Delhi
- 1994 - LTG Gallery, New Delhi
- 1994 - World Wide Gallery, New York, USA
- 1995 - Aurobindo Gallery, New Delhi
- 1996 - LTG Gallery, New Delhi
- 1998 - LTG Gallery, New Delhi
- 1998 - Indian High Commission, Port Louis, Mauritius
- 1999 - Max Mueller Bhavan, New Delhi
- 1999 - Shoman Foundation, Amman, Jordan
- 1999 - St. Raphael Gallery, London, England
- 2000 - Honjo Gallery, Tokyo, Japan
- 2001 - Gallery Zen, Bangalore, India
- 2002 - S. Art Gallery, Moscow, Russia
- 2003 - The Grand Hotel, New Delhi
- 2003 - Pioneer Gallery, New Delhi
- 2005 - Visual Art Gallery, Indian Habitat Center, New Delhi
- 2006 - Embassy of Slovak Republic, New Delhi
- 2007 - Lalit Kala Akademi, New Delhi
- 2012 - Alliance Francaise, New Delhi
- 2013 - Lalit Kala Akademi, New Delhi
- 2016-17 - Marin County Foundation, Novada, San Francisco, USA

== Group exhibitions ==
- 1956 to 1969 - AIFACS, New Delhi, Annual Exhibitions.
- 1961 - A.I.R, New Delhi, Exhibition on Theme of Music
- 1963 - Three Painters Inaugural Show, Chemould Gallery, Mumbai
- 1963 - Exhibition for National Defence Fund, L.K.A., New Delhi
- 1963 to 1975 - Annual National Exhibitions, L.K.A., New Delhi
- 1966 - Flowers and Flowering Trees, AIFACS, New Delhi
- 1967 - Seven Artists, Kumar Gallery, New Delhi
- 1968, 1969, 1992 - Sahitya Kala Parishad, Delhi
- 1970 - Art Today by Kunika Chemould, New Delhi
- 1972 - Avant-Garde Indian Paintings, Kumar Gallery, New Delhi
- 1972 - Inaugural Group Show, Chanakya Gallery, Akbar Hotel, New Delhi
- 1973 - Twenty Five Years of Indian Art, New Delhi
- 1973 - International Playgroup's Annual Exhibition, IBM, New York, USA
- 1977 - AIFACS, Golden Jubilee International Exhibition, New Delhi
- 1980 - Miniature Format Paintings, L.K.A., New Delhi
- 1983 - Second Asian Art Biennale, Bangladesh
- 1983 - 84 - 'Tantra' Exhibition, India Festival West German Museums
- 1984 - 15th International Exhibition, Japan.
- 1985 - 'Neo - Tantra' Art Exhibition, New South Wales, Australia
- 1987 - Indian Art Exhibition for International Book Fair, Frankfurt, Germany
- 1987 - Indian Festival, Moscow, USSR
- 1988 - Exhibition of CRY, Metro Cities of India
- 1989 - Art Teachers Exhibition, HABIART, New Delhi
- 1990 - 50 Artists by Gallery Chanakya at L.K.A., New Delhi
- 1990 - Ambassador's Choice at NGMA, New Delhi
- 1991 - Changing Images, Jahangir Art Gallery, Mumbai
- 1991 - Award Winner's National Exhibition of Art, L.K.A., New Delhi
- 1991 - Connoisseur's Choice at Habiart, New Delhi
- 1994 - Spiritual and Cultural Exchange Exhibition, AIFACS, New Delhi.
- 1995 - A Homage to Gandhi, LTG Gallery, New Delhi
- 1997 - Magnetic Forms at Art Konsult, New Delhi
- 1998 - Symbolism and Geometry in Indian Art, NGMA, New Delhi
- 2005 - Christies Auction, New York, U.S.A
- 2006 - Triveda Auction, New Delhi
- 2006 - Harmony Show, Mumbai
- 2006 - Pioneer Gallery, New Delhi
- 2006 - Suruchi Art Gallery, New Delhi
- 2006 - Colours - Artland, Mumbai
- 2007- Bonhams Auction, London
- 2007- Red Earth, Monsoon Show, New Delhi
- 2007- Osians Auction, New Delhi
- 2007- 60th Milestone, New Delhi
- 2007- Rainbow In the Sun, L.K.A, New Delhi
- 2007- Tales of Textures, Art Elements Gallery, New Delhi
- 2007- Art for Prabhat, New Delhi
- 2007 - Convergence, Trident Hilton, Gurgaon
- 2007- D.M.G 70th Anniversary Show L.K.A, New Delhi
- 2008- Art for Aged, Auction, Oberoi Hotel, New Delhi
- 2010 - Haryana Art Academy, L.K.A. New Delhi
- 2014 - India Art Fair, New Delhi
- 2015 - Spiritual Art Exhibition of Museum of Sacred Art, Belgium at Lalit Kala Akademi, New Delhi
- 2016 - Spiritual Art by MOSA at Lalit Kala Academi, New Delhi
