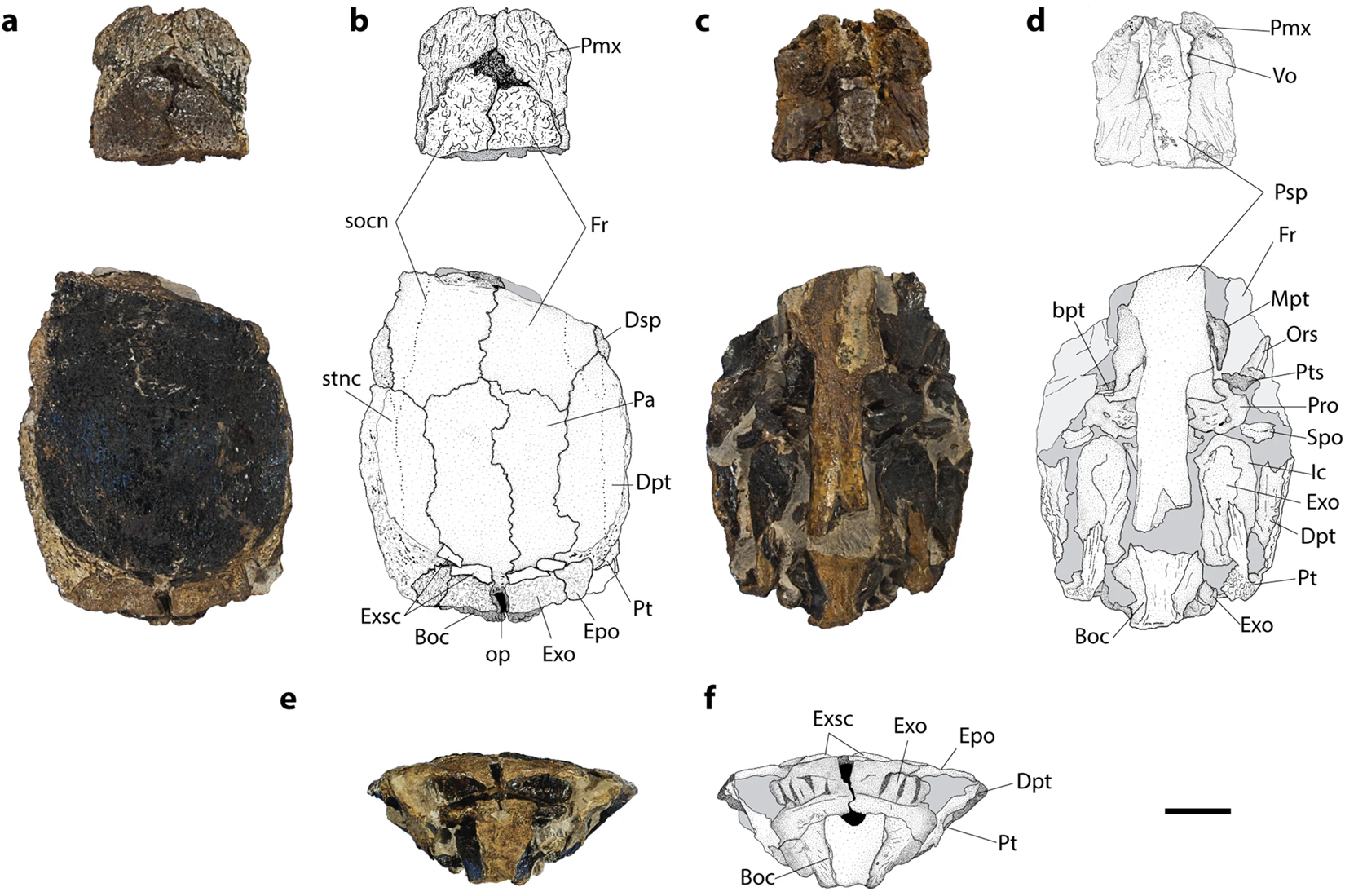
- Holotype of Nhanulepisosteus mexicanus

Scientific classification
- Kingdom: Animalia
- Phylum: Chordata
- Class: Actinopterygii
- Clade: Ginglymodi
- Order: Lepisosteiformes
- Family: Lepisosteidae
- Genus: †Nhanulepisosteus; Brito et al. 2017
- Species: †N. mexicanus

Binomial name
- †Nhanulepisosteus mexicanus Brito et al. 2017

= Nhanulepisosteus =

Nhanulepisosteus Temporal range: Late Jurassic (Kimmeridgian), 157 Ma

Species of fish

Nhanulepisosteus is an extinct genus of gar from the Upper Jurassic of Mexico. All remains of the genus have been found at Llano Yosobé, a locality belonging to the Sabinal Formation located near the city of Tlaxiaco. Though from the Jurassic, the fish shows most features seen in modern gar such as the lacrimomaxillary; a bone located at the front of the skull. Nhanulepisosteus had a short, wide snout that allowed it to use suction when feeding more than modern gars. One of the most notable features of the skull is the frontmost tooth on the bottom dentition that has been referred to as a fang. This is due to this tooth being five times larger than the teeth behind it. Similar to other early gars, Nhanulepisosteus was found in marine environments. There is only one species in the genus: N. mexicanus.

== History and naming ==
The material assigned to Nhanulepisosteus was collected from Llano Yosobé, a locality of the Sabinal Formation near Tlaxiaco in southern Mexico. These specimens were then held in the "Colección Nacional de Paleontología" of the Instituto de Geologia at the National Autonomous University of Mexico. The material was described by Paulo M. Brito, Jésus Alvarado-Ortega, and François J. Meunier in 2017 as the earliest member of Lepisosteidae. These remains included the holotype (IGM 4898) which is represented by a partial 3 dimensionally preserved skull along with four other specimens which represent multiple lower jaws and scales. In 2022, the same authors published a second paper focusing the histology of the fish's teeth.

The generic name of Nhanulepisosteus is a combination of nhanu, which translates to "old" in Mixteca language, along with Lepisosteus. The specific name refers to Mexico, the country where the specimens were found.

== Description ==
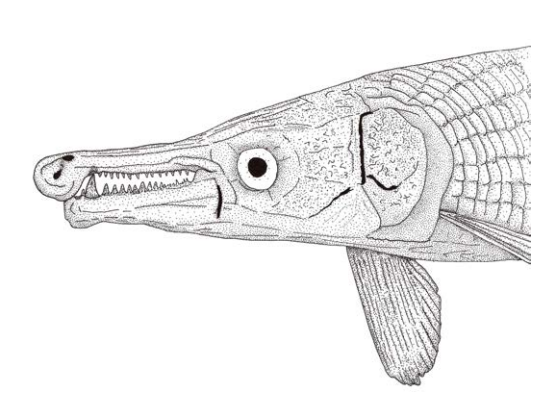
Life restoration of Nhanulepisosteus mexicanus

Nhanulepisosteus had a shorter skull than most gars, more comparable to the extinct genus Masillosteus than any living gar genus. The skull roof is only partially preserved and, like other gars, has an ornamented surface. The region of the skull between the front of the snout and the back of the frontals is missing in the most complete specimen. The front-most portion of the skull was made up by the fused premaxillae along with the lacrimomaxillary which borders it. Foramina for the olfactory nerves are located at the front of the snout. Just posterior to them are the largest bones of the skull roof, the frontal bones. Though incompletely known in the holotype, they seem to have tapered towards the front. The dermosphenotics are much smaller bones that are located laterally to the posterior portion of the frontals. The supraorbital sensory canals run along the length of the frontals into the supratemporal canal found within the dermosphenotics. Both dermosphenotics and parietals, a paired bone located behind the frontals, are both sutured to the other bones of the skull roof. At least four extrascapulars, based on the number present in the holotype, would have been present in the fish. Under the posterior portion of the series are the posttemporals which have a large rod on the ventral surface which connects to both the braincase and intercalar. Unlike in other lepisosteids, the lateral line sensory canal runs through this rod. The paired vomers are sutured posteriorly to the parasphenoid. This bone runs along the majority of the skull's length, having two lateral wings and a forked posterior. As in other gars, these wings along with the anterior edge of the prootics, form the basipterygoid process. This process, in turn, articulates with the metapterygoid.

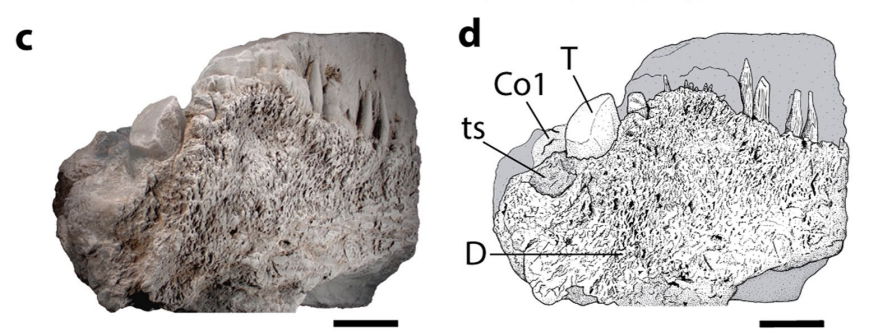
Anterior portion of the lower jaw showing the fang compared to the smaller teeth behind it

The long dentary, similar to the other bones of the skull, is ornamented. It increases in height posteriorly, making it triangular in shape. The anterior coronoid is located at the jaw's symphysis. Teeth are largely known from the lower jaw but some from the upper jaw are known. The only portion of the upper dentition known is the small teeth on the premaxilla. The bottom dentition, on the other hand, is more well known and is made up of two rows of teeth. The first, outer, row is made up of many small teeth more similar to what is seen in the upper dentition. The teeth of the inner row are much larger than those in the outer row. This is especially the case for the front-most teeth which have been referred to as fangs due to them being five times larger than the teeth behind them. The larger inner teeth are ridged. These begin as pleats of dentine and enamel at the bases but become crests due to the thickening of the enamel. Under this is a thick dentine layer that has tiny canals, referred to as odontoblastic canalicles running parallel to one another. These ridges are also seen in a majority the pulp cavity of the teeth, excluding the uppermost section. The dentine within the cavity is made up of vascular canals surrounded by odontoblastic canalicles which lie at 90 degree angles from the cavity. In contrast to this, the medium-sized teeth within the dentition have ridges but have an empty pulp cavity. A large number of small smooth teeth are also present on pharyngeal bony plates. These are simple dentine cones with an empty pulp cavity. The features if the dentition, especially the larger teeth, result in dentition that is more complex than modern genera.

=== Braincase ===
The braincase of Nhanulepisosteus is similar to what is seen in other lepisosteids, in lacking the posterior myodome, basisphenoid, supraoccipital, and opisthotic. The orbitosphenoid has paired "wings" that expand outwards and fuse anteromedially with one another and posteriorly have a suture with the pterosphenoids. The prootic bone is located at the front of the braincase, having an anterior process formed by not only the prootic but also the parasphenoid. The bone also articulates with the sphenotic which is connected to the ventral surface of the dermopterotic. The exoccipitals and epiotics form part of the posterior edge of the braincase. The exoccipitals extend between the vagus nerve foramen and the foramen magnum. Anteriorly and posteriorly, the bones suture to the intercalar bones and articulate with the epioccipitals respectively. The intercalars also are partially sutured to the exoccipitals posteriorly. The epiotics are also sutured to the top surface of the exoccipitals. Along with this, they meet the dermopterotic and nearly each other at the skull's midline. The basioccipital is the posterior-most bone of the braincase that is located under the exoccipital. Two vertebrae have been incorporated with the basioccipital.

=== Postcranium ===
The only postcranial material known from Nhanulepisosteus is associated though disarticulated ganiod scales similar in morphology to other gars. These are made up of two layers: a hypermineralised layer of ganoine and a basal bony plate.

== Classification ==
In the initial 2017 description of the genus, Nhanulepisosteus was determined to be the sister group to all other members of Lepisosteidae. This placement is due to a few features such as the lacrimomaxillary bones and the scale morphology. Though the teeth do have plicidentine, the folding seen in the inner portion of the tooth. Due to the complex morphology of the teeth, it has been noted that if the genus was only known by teeth it would have been placed in its own family. In contrast to these features, the presence of the rod on the posttemporals and the large intercalar are more similar to obaichthyids. Later publications such as the 2022 paper by Chase Doran Brownstein focusing to the diversification of gars found a similar result to the 2017 publication. In 2025, Agustín Guillermo Martinelli and coauthors described a gar from the Bauru Group in Brazil. Based on the similar dentition seen in both genera it was determined that the gar, Britosteus amarildoi, was the sister genus to Nhanulepisosteus in their phylogenic analysis. The phylogenic analyses from all three of the mentioned publications can be found below:

Brito et al. (2017)

- - - †Obaichthyidae
    - - Lepisosteidae
        - †Nhanulepisosteus
        - - †Masillosteus
          - - †Cuneatus
            - - Lepisosteus
              - Atractosteus

Brownstein at. al. (2023)

- - - †Semionotus
    - - †Macrosemius
      - - - †Dentilepisosteus
          - †Obaichthys
        - - †Nhanulepisosteus
          - - - †Cuneatus
              - †Masillosteus
            - - †Herreraichthys
              - - Lepisosteus
                - †Atractosteus falipoui
                - - †Asfla Taxon
                  - Atractosteus

Martinelli et al. (2025)

- - - †Semionotus
    - - - †Dentilepisosteus
        - †Obaichthys
      - - - †Nhanulepisosteus
          - †Britosteus
        - - †Cuneatus
          - - †Masillosteus
            - - †Grandemarinus
              - - Lepisosteus
                - Atractosteus

== Paleobiology ==
=== Paleoecology ===
Based on the tooth morphology of Nhanulepisosteus, the fish was most likely piscivorous with a similar feeding mechanism to modern gar. Unlike modern gars however, the wider jaws of the animal most likely caused suction to be a larger part of feeding strategy of Nhanulepisosteus. This is in contrast to other known wide-jawed gar species in the fossil record such as Masillosteus which had dentition more similar to durophagous animals.

=== Paleoenvironment ===
Unlike most modern gars, though similar to a number of other extinct members of the clade, Nhanulepisosteus was a fish found in marine environments. This area was a transitional marine environment before becoming a completely marine environment during the Cretaceous. The Llano Yosobé locality records a fairly diverse marine tetrapod assemblage including Maledictosuchus, Notoemys, an ophthalmosaurid ichthyosaur, and pliosaurids. The fish fauna of Llano Yosobé, like the tetrapods, is also characteristic of the age. A majority of the assemblage is made up of Vinctifer, pycnodonts that have been assigned to Gyrodus, Pleuropholis, and Planohybodus. The invertebrate fauna from the site is made up of ammonites such as Ataxioceras and Idoceras.
