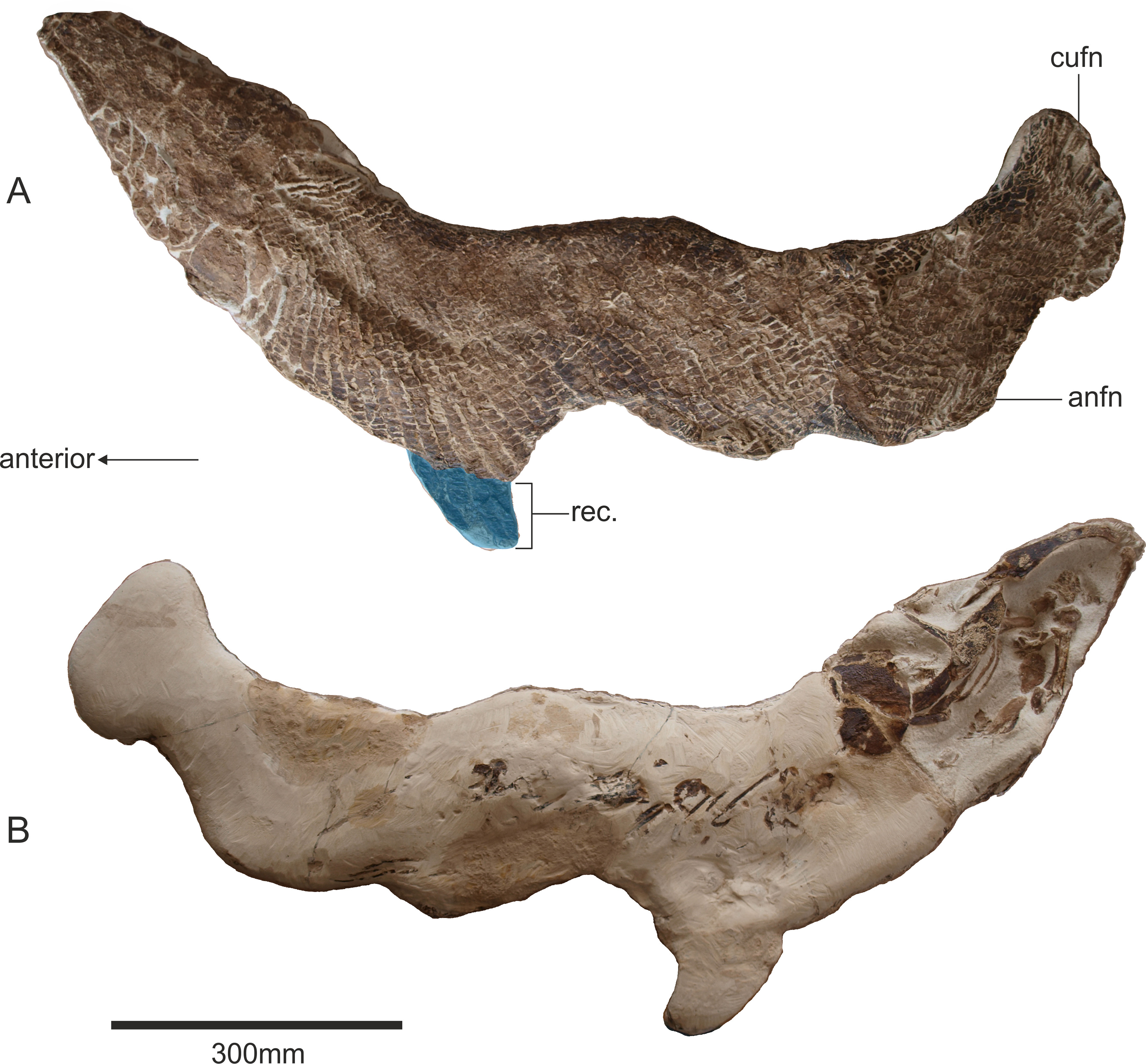
- Holotype specimen; fin highlighted in blue is a fabrication

Scientific classification
- Kingdom: Animalia
- Phylum: Chordata
- Class: Actinopterygii
- Clade: Ginglymodi
- Order: Lepisosteiformes
- Family: Lepisosteidae
- Tribe: Lepisosteini
- Genus: †Grandemarinus; Cooper et al., 2023
- Species: †G. gherisensis

Binomial name
- †Grandemarinus gherisensis Cooper, Gunn, Brito, Zouhri & Martill, 2023

= Grandemarinus =

Grandemarinus Temporal range: Late Cretaceous (Turonian)

Extinct genus of gar

Grandemarinus is an extinct genus of gar from the Late Cretaceous of Morocco. It contains a single species, G. gherisensis. The genus name honors evolutionary biologist Lance Grande and references the species' apparent marine nature, while the specific epithet references Oued Gheris, a wadi near the type locality.

It is known from three specimens, one of which is fully preserved, from the Turonian Akrabou Formation, one of several formations comprising the Kem Kem Group. The complete specimen was found in the house of a local collector, but had been sold to a private collector before it could be acquired to science. It was recovered later when it was found being sold on an internet forum.

The Akrabou Formation preserves a largely pelagic ecosystem, indicating that Grandemarinus was an entirely marine species, in contrast to extant gar, which are found in mostly freshwater and brackish ecosystems, but similar to what is thought to have been the ancestral condition for gars. For this reason, it is thought to either represent a late-surviving member of the early marine gars or a descendant of freshwater gars that migrated back into the ocean. It has an unusually short-snouted appearance akin to that of the basal fossil gar Masillosteus and Cuneatus, but its anatomy indicates that it is more closely related to the extant Lepisosteus and Atractosteus. The short snout was likely evolved as a specialized trait for catching certain pelagic fish.
