= Oniichthys =

Oniichthys Temporal range: Cenomanian

Scientific classification
- Kingdom: Animalia
- Phylum: Chordata
- Class: Actinopterygii
- Clade: Ginglymodi
- Order: Lepisosteiformes
- Family: Lepisosteidae
- Tribe: Lepisosteini
- Genus: †Oniichthys; Cavin & Brito, 2001
- Species: †O. falipoui

Binomial name
- †Oniichthys falipoui Cavin & Brito, 2001

Synonyms
- Atractosteus falipoui (Cavin & Brito, 2001)

Fossil genus of fishes

Oniichthys is an extinct genus of gar in the family Lepisosteidae. It contains a single species, O. falipoui, known from the Late Cretaceous (Cenomanian) of Morocco.

It is known from a few very well-preserved, near-complete specimens from the Kem Kem Formation, where it coexisted with the famous Spinosaurus. It closely resembles the modern genus Atractosteus, and is generally placed as its sister genus, a sister to Atractosteus and Lepisosteus, or even as a species within Atractosteus as per Grande (2010), although this latter view has been disputed based on differences in skull morphology.

The genus name references the Ooni, divine Yoruba kings, while the specific epithet honors Christian Falipou, who loaned one of the type specimens.
