= Lepisosteus indicus =

Lepisosteus indicus Temporal range: Maastrichtian to Danian

Scientific classification
- Kingdom: Animalia
- Phylum: Chordata
- Class: Actinopterygii
- Clade: Ginglymodi
- Order: Lepisosteiformes
- Family: Lepisosteidae
- Genus: Lepisosteus
- Species: †L. indicus

Binomial name
- †Lepisosteus indicus (Woodward, 1890)

Synonyms
- †Belonostomus indicus Woodward, 1890

Extinct species of fish

Lepisosteus indicus, the Indian gar, is an extinct species of gar known from the Late Cretaceous (Maastrichtian) and early Paleocene of India. It is known from a single articulated but poorly-preserved skull and a lost set of vertebrae from the Lameta Formation, in addition to numerous isolated scales and teeth from the Lameta Formation and Intertrappean Beds.

== Taxonomy ==
It was initially described by Woodward (1890) as a species of unrelated aspidorhynchid fish (Belonostomus indicus) until he reclassified it as a gar in 1909. L. indicus is generally thought to belong to the genus Lepisosteus, a genus that contains several modern gar species that are found in eastern North America. The presence of this species in India suggests that the genus had a much larger range in prehistoric times, and it is thought to be the easternmost known Lepisosteus species overall. However, some recent studies suggest that it may be only a stem-member of Lepisosteus, as some of the synapomorphies that were originally thought to be exclusive to Lepisosteus, and thus supporting this species' placement in that genus, have been found to be non-indicative. However, it is likely to be more closely related to Lepisosteus than to any other gar.

== Occurrence ==
Although only a single, crushed, partial articulated specimen is known representing an individual of about 75–90 centimetres (2.46–2.95 ft) in length, the ganoid scales and teeth assigned to this species are abundant in Maastrichtian and early Paleocene freshwater deposits of India, including Madhya Pradesh, Maharashtra, and Telangana.

It is possible that this species or its close relatives had a wider geographic and temporal distribution: isolated gar scales (considered Lepisosteidae indet.) are known from the Kallamedu Formation of Tamil Nadu in southern India, which is contemporaneous with the Lameta Formation. In addition, the partial trunk of a small-sized gar that may potentially be L. indicus is known from the Late Paleocene-aged Palana Formation in Rajasthan, India, while isolated Lepisosteus scales are known from the middle Eocene (Lutetian)-aged Kuldana Formation of Kohat, Pakistan, representing the youngest record of gars on the subcontinent. The Pakistani Lepisosteus have been previously referred to L. indicus, but analysis of their scales indicates some differences from L. indicus, and a closer similarity to the modern longnose gar.
