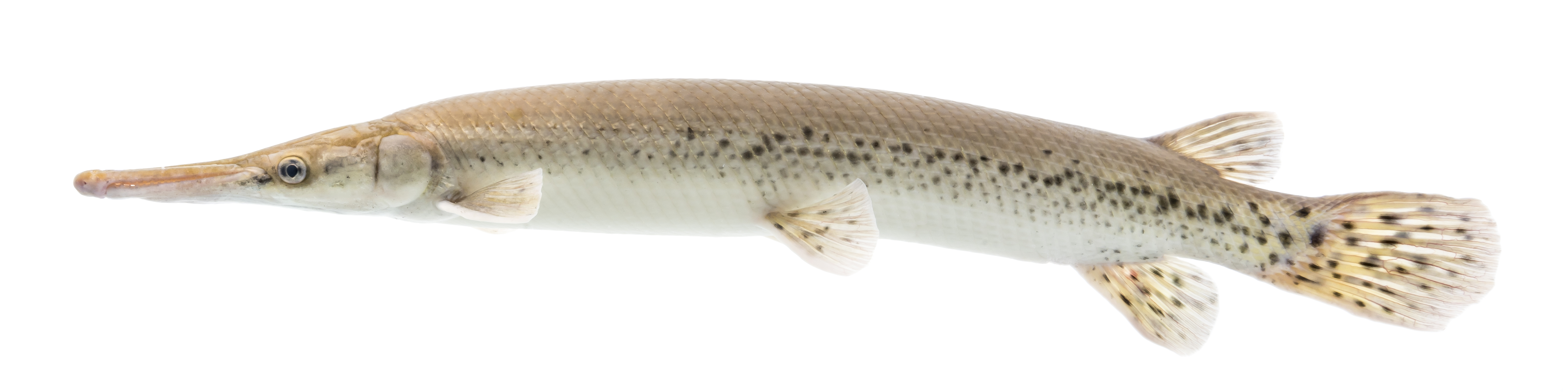

Conservation status
- Least Concern (IUCN 3.1)

Scientific classification
- Kingdom: Animalia
- Phylum: Chordata
- Class: Actinopterygii
- Clade: Ginglymodi
- Order: Lepisosteiformes
- Family: Lepisosteidae
- Genus: Lepisosteus
- Species: L. platostomus

Binomial name
- Lepisosteus platostomus Rafinesque, 1820

Synonyms
- Cylindrosteus platostomus (Rafinesque, 1820); Lepisosteus albus Rafinesque, 1820; Cylindrosteus rafinesquii Duméril, 1870; Cylindrosteus scabriceps Fowler, 1911

= Shortnose gar =

Species of fish

The shortnose gar (Lepisosteus platostomus) is a primitive freshwater fish of the family Lepisosteidae. It is native to the United States where its range includes the Mississippi and Missouri River basins, ranging from Montana to the west and the Ohio River to the east, southwards to the Gulf Coast. It inhabits calm waters in large rivers and their backwaters, as well as oxbow lakes and large pools. It is a long, slender fish, brown or olive green above and whitish below. It typically grows to about 60 cm (24 in) and is armored by rows of interlocking, rhomboidal ganoid scales.

The shortnose gar is an ambush predator, feeding mostly on fish, but also consuming crustaceans, insects, and other invertebrates. Breeding takes place in spring when females, often accompanied by several males, attach their eggs to clumps of submerged vegetation. The eggs, which are toxic to man, hatch after a week or so. After consuming their yolk sac, the young fish feed on insect larvae and small crustaceans, maturing at an age of about three years.

== Description ==
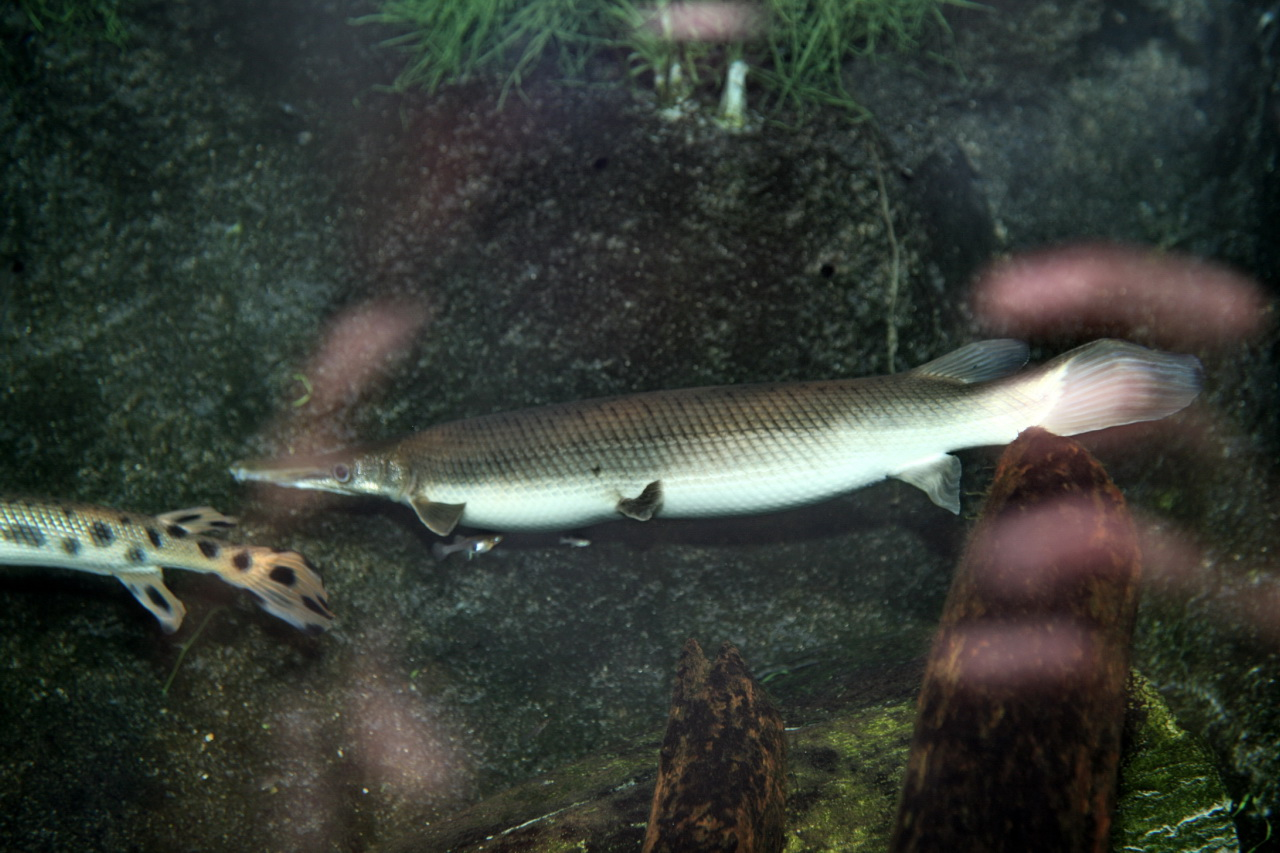
Lepisosteus platostomus

Shortnose gar have a prehistoric-looking appearance. Like many other "lie-in-wait" predators, they have an elongated, torpedo-like body with an elongated head containing one row of sharp, conical teeth. Similar to many Paleozoic and Mesozoic actinopterygians, their bodies are covered in rows of interlocking, rhomboidal ganoid scales that create an exceptionally protective, yet flexible armor around the fish. The dorsal fin is located posterior nearly directly above the anal fin and very near the large caudal fin. Shortnose gar vary in color, changing from brown/olive green on the dorsal surface to yellow on the sides and white on the underbelly. Shortnose gar can be discerned from other gar species in that they lack the upper jaw of the alligator gar, the long snout of the longnose gar, and the markings of the spotted gar. The shortnose gar reaches up to 88 cm (35 in), but a more common length is 62.5 cm (24.6 in).

== Habitat ==
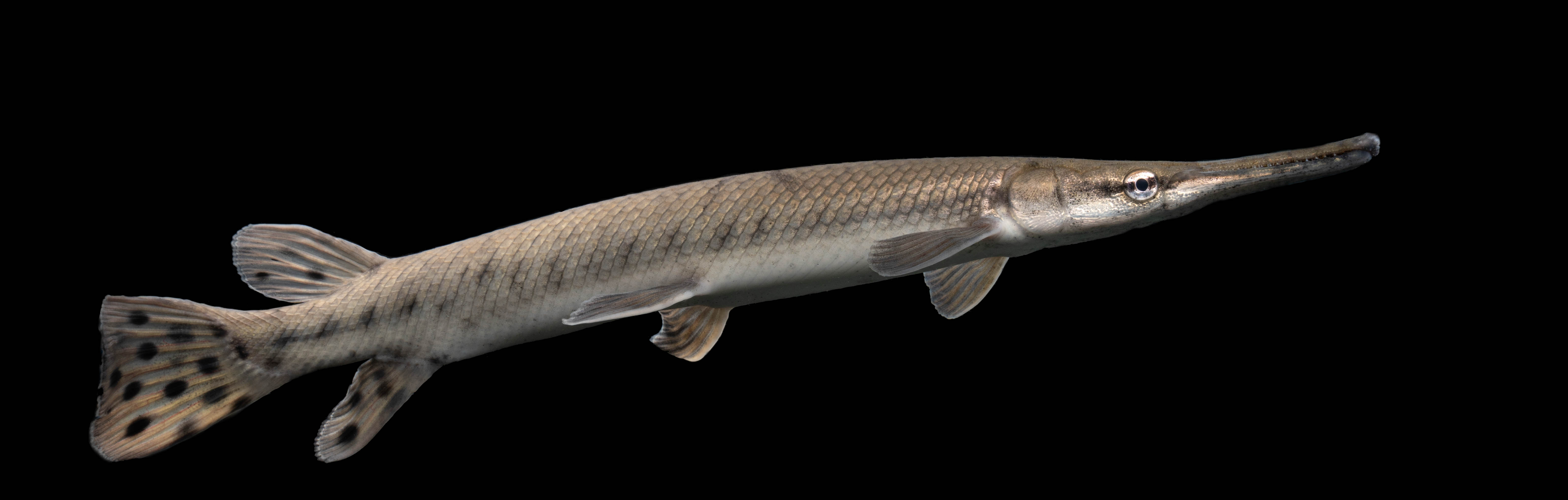
At Gavins Point National Fish Hatchery

Shortnose gar generally inhabit calm waters in large rivers and their backwaters, as well as oxbow lakes and large, quiet pools, typically around vegetation or downed logs. Gar have the ability to survive in environments with very little oxygen and especially turbid conditions because of their specialized gas bladder. Gar gas bladders have the ability to function like a lung to extract and use oxygen from swallowed air in addition to regulating buoyancy.

== Reproduction and lifecycle ==
Shortnose gar typically spawn in the spring during April, May, and June, when water temperatures are between 16 and 21 °C (61 and 70 °F). Often accompanied by more than one male, females scatter large, yellowish-green eggs in quiet, shallow water among submerged vegetation or other underwater structures. A sticky adhesive holds the eggs together in clumps, where they hatch after eight to 9 days. The eggs are poisonous to birds and mammals, including humans. The young remain in the yolk sac for another week, then they feed on insect larvae and small crustaceans. Young gar typically lead solitary lives and sexual maturity is achieved around three years of age when the gar reaches about 15 in (380 mm) in length.

== Diet and habits ==
Shortnose gar are efficient, fierce, ambush predators. They feed mainly on fish, but they are very opportunistic and also eat crayfish, insects, and other invertebrates. During seasonal flooding, Shortnose gar have been observed exploiting newly accessible floodplains to reach terrestrial prey, such as insects and amphibians, thereby broadening their dietary opportunities. Despite feeding mainly on whatever fish are available, Shortnose gar eat more invertebrates than any other gar and have even been found to exhibit territorial defense behaviors around favorable pools while foraging on high numbers of periodical cicadas.

== Distribution ==
Shortnose gar today are only located in North America. Located mainly in the central United States, they occupy much of the Mississippi and Missouri River basins ranging from Montana (in the west) to the Ohio River (in the east) in the north and the Gulf Coast from Louisiana and Alabama to parts of Texas in the south.

== Importance to humans ==
Shortnose gar help maintain ecosystem equilibrium by feeding on minnows that are destructive to game fish and other fish populations. They are popular aquarium fish, and are frequently found in public aquariums across the country.

== Conservation status ==
With very few natural predators able to cope with a gar's thick ganoid scale armor, shortnose gar are generally plentiful. One exception is in Montana, where they are considered a fish of special concern due to restricted distribution and limited population sizes. In Ohio, they are an endangered species because of limited range (primarily the Ohio River and lower Scioto and Great Miami Rivers).

== Etymology of name ==
In Greek, Lepisosteus translates to "bony scale", and platostomus translates to "broad mouth".
