= Herreraichthys =

Herreraichthys Temporal range: Late Cretaceous (Santonian)

Scientific classification
- Domain: Eukaryota
- Kingdom: Animalia
- Phylum: Chordata
- Class: Actinopterygii
- Clade: Ginglymodi
- Order: Lepisosteiformes
- Family: Lepisosteidae
- Tribe: Lepisosteini
- Genus: †Herreraichthys; Alvarado-Ortega et al., 2016
- Species: †H. coahuilaensis

Binomial name
- †Herreraichthys coahuilaensis Alvarado-Ortega, Brito, Porras-Múzquiz & Mújica-Monroy, 2016

Extinct genus of gar

Herreraichthys is an extinct genus of gar from the Late Cretaceous of Mexico. It contains a single species, H. coahuilaensis. The genus name honors the famous Mexican scientist Alfonso L. Herrera.

It is known from Santonian-aged sediments from the "Los Temporales" quarry in Coahuila. It is a long-snouted fish that appears to be more closely related to extant gar (Atractosteus and Lepisosteus) than to other fossil gar, and it is thus placed in the same tribe (Lepisosteini) as extant gar. Its occurrence in marine strata suggests that it may have been a fully marine species, similar to what is thought of ancestral gars and in contrast to extant gar, which are found in freshwater habitats. However, it is also possible that as with the modern alligator gar, it could temporarily survive in the sea.
