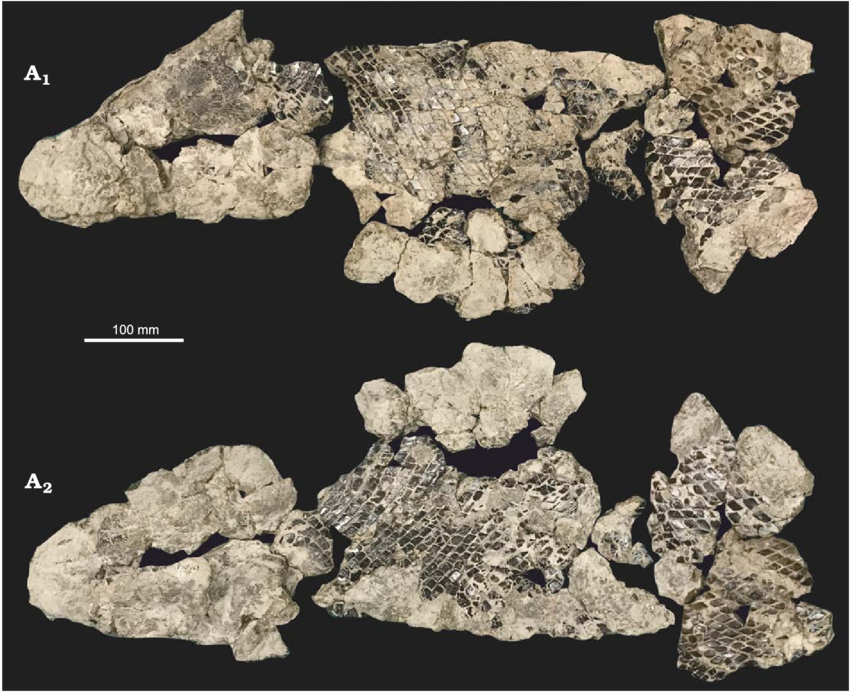
- Cuneatus maximus dorsal view (A1) and ventral view (A2)

Scientific classification
- Kingdom: Animalia
- Phylum: Chordata
- Class: Actinopterygii
- Clade: Ginglymodi
- Order: Lepisosteiformes
- Family: Lepisosteidae
- Tribe: †Cuneatini
- Genus: †Cuneatus; Grande, 2010

Type species
- †Lepisosteus cuneatus Cope, 1878

Species
- †C. cuneatus (Cope, 1878); †C. maximus Brownstein, 2022; †C. wileyi Grande, 2010

= Cuneatus =

Cuneatus Temporal range: Late Paleocene–Early Eocene

Extinct genus of fish

Cuneatus is an extinct genus of gar that inhabited western North America during the early Paleogene. As the genus name suggests, they are distinguishable from modern gar by their cuneate (wedge-shaped) heads, with a significantly shortened snout. Three species are known: C. cuneatus, C. maximus, and C. wileyi.

== Taxonomy ==
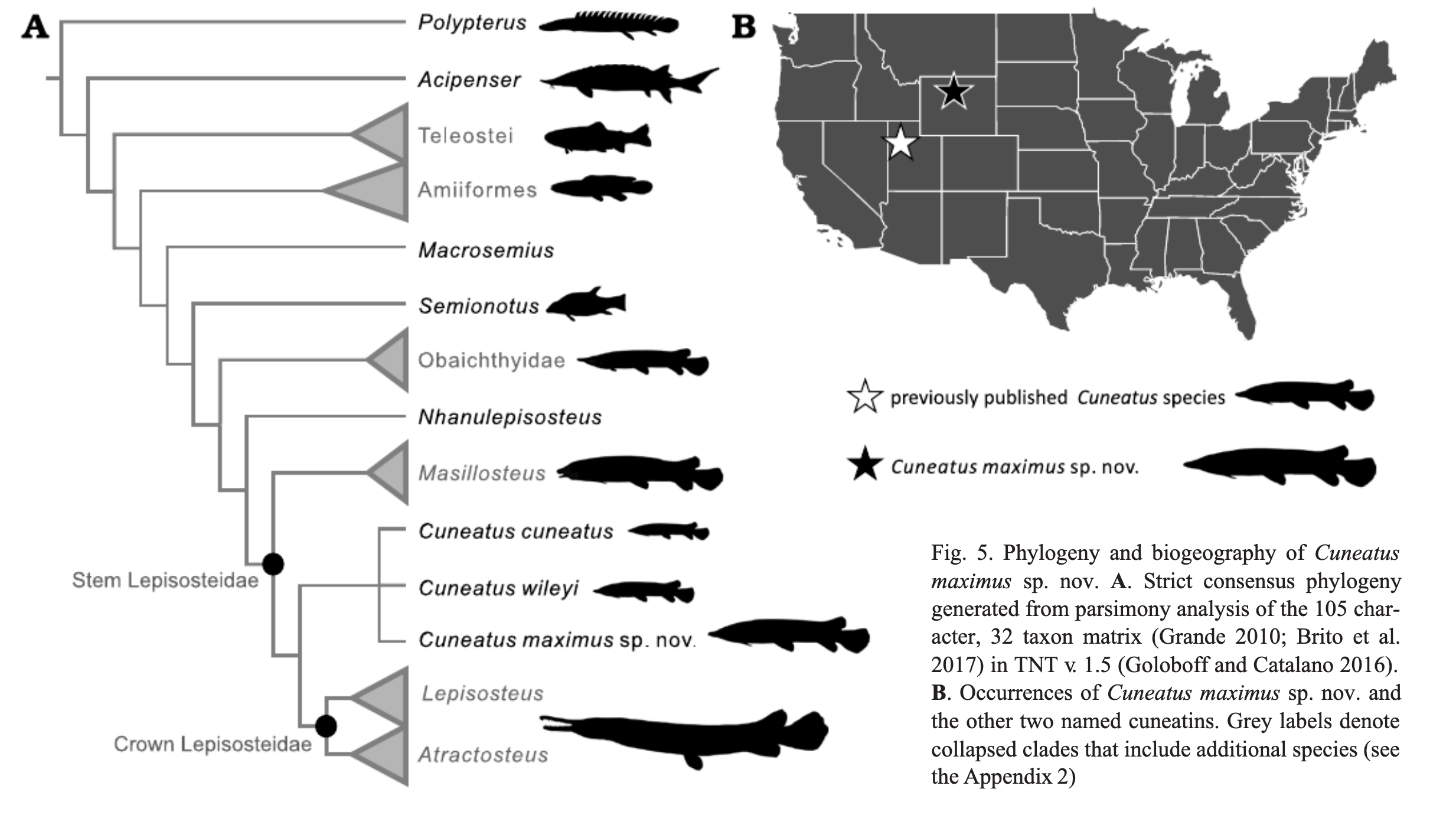
Phylogeny

They are thought to belong to the Cuneatini, a now-extinct tribe of short-snouted gar. The genus Masillosteus is also sometimes placed in this tribe, but other studies have found Cuneatus to be more closely related to extant gars than to Masillosteus. The tribe is thought to have originated in the Cretaceous, despite being only known from Paleogene fossils. Species in Cuneatus are known to have coexisted with species belonging to both extant gar genera (Atractosteus and Lepisosteus) in known localities.

The type species of the genus was described as "Lepisosteus" cuneatus by Edward Drinker Cope from the Green River Formation of Utah. A 2010 study by Lance Grande found it to be morphologically highly divergent from any of the extant genera, and thus classified it in its own genus Cuneatus, in addition to describing a second species of Cuneatus (C. wileyi) from the Green River Formation. Both species are common in mass death assemblages from the "Lake Uinta" division of the formation.

The largest species in the genus, Cuneatus maximus, was described by Brownstein (2022) from the Willwood Formation of Wyoming, from which it is the first known fossil fish. Its distinct morphology and geographic separation from the other two Cuneatus species indicates it to be the basal species of the genus.

== Gallery ==
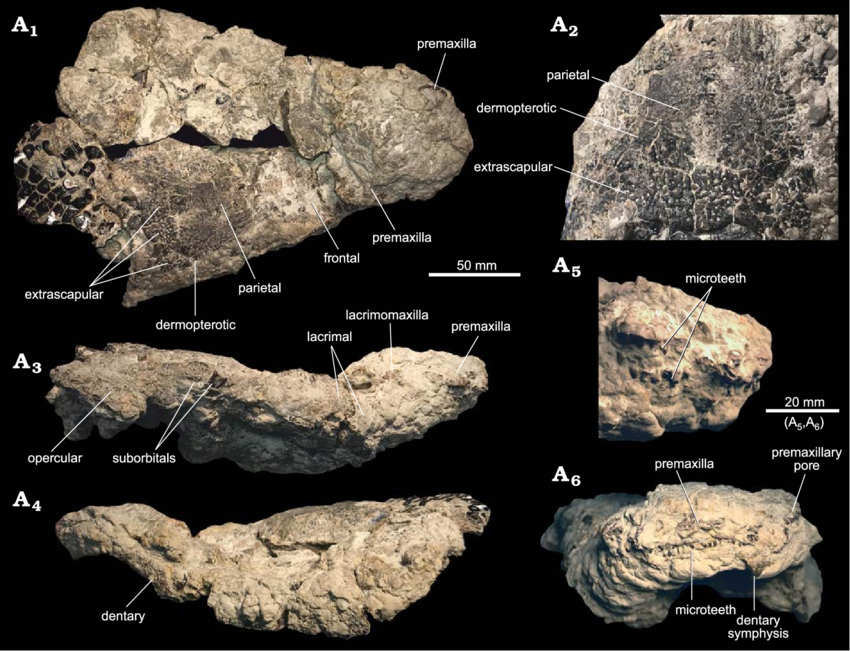
C. maximus

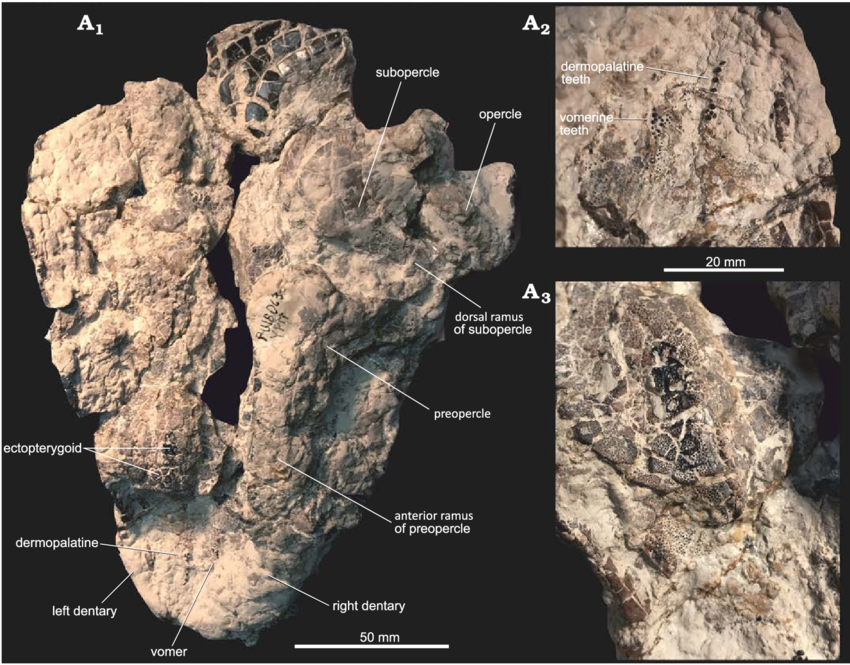
C. maximus
