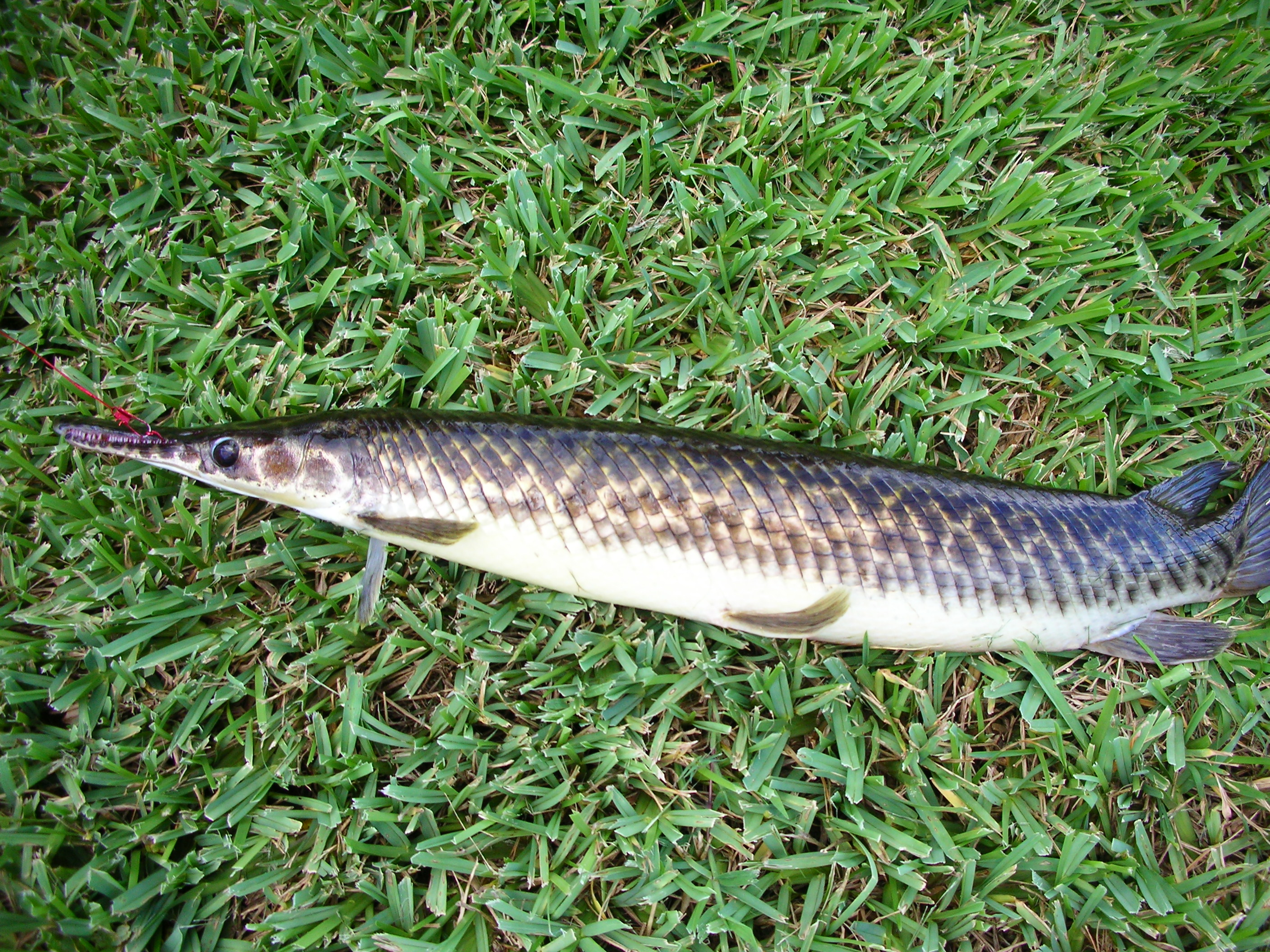

Conservation status
- Least Concern (IUCN 3.1)

Scientific classification
- Kingdom: Animalia
- Phylum: Chordata
- Class: Actinopterygii
- Clade: Ginglymodi
- Order: Lepisosteiformes
- Family: Lepisosteidae
- Genus: Lepisosteus
- Species: L. platyrhincus

Binomial name
- Lepisosteus platyrhincus DeKay 1842

Synonyms
- Cylindrosteus castelnaudii Duméril 1870; Cylindrosteus megalops Fowler 1911

= Florida gar =

Species of fish

The Florida gar (Lepisosteus platyrhincus) is a species of gar found in the US from the Savannah River and Ochlockonee River watersheds of Georgia and throughout peninsular Florida. Florida gar can reach a length over 3 ft (91 cm). The young feed on zooplankton and insect larvae, as well as small fish. Adults mainly eat fish, shrimp, and crayfish. Although edible, they are not popular as food. The roe is highly toxic to many animals, including humans and birds.

== Appearance ==
This is a mid-sized species of gar. It measures from 51.7 to 132.2 cm (20.4 to 52.0 in) long and typically weighs 1.36 to 4.36 kg (3.0 to 9.6 lb). According to the IGFA, the record weight for this species is 10 lb (4.5 kg). This species has irregular round, black spots on the top of its head and over the entire body including the anal fin. The distance of the eyes is less than two-thirds the length of the snout. Also, it has a shorter, broad snout with a single row of irregularly spaced sharp teeth on the upper and lower jaws. No bony scales are on the throat. Their color is olive-brown on the back and upper sides, with a white to yellow belly. The young may have dark stripes on the back and sides.
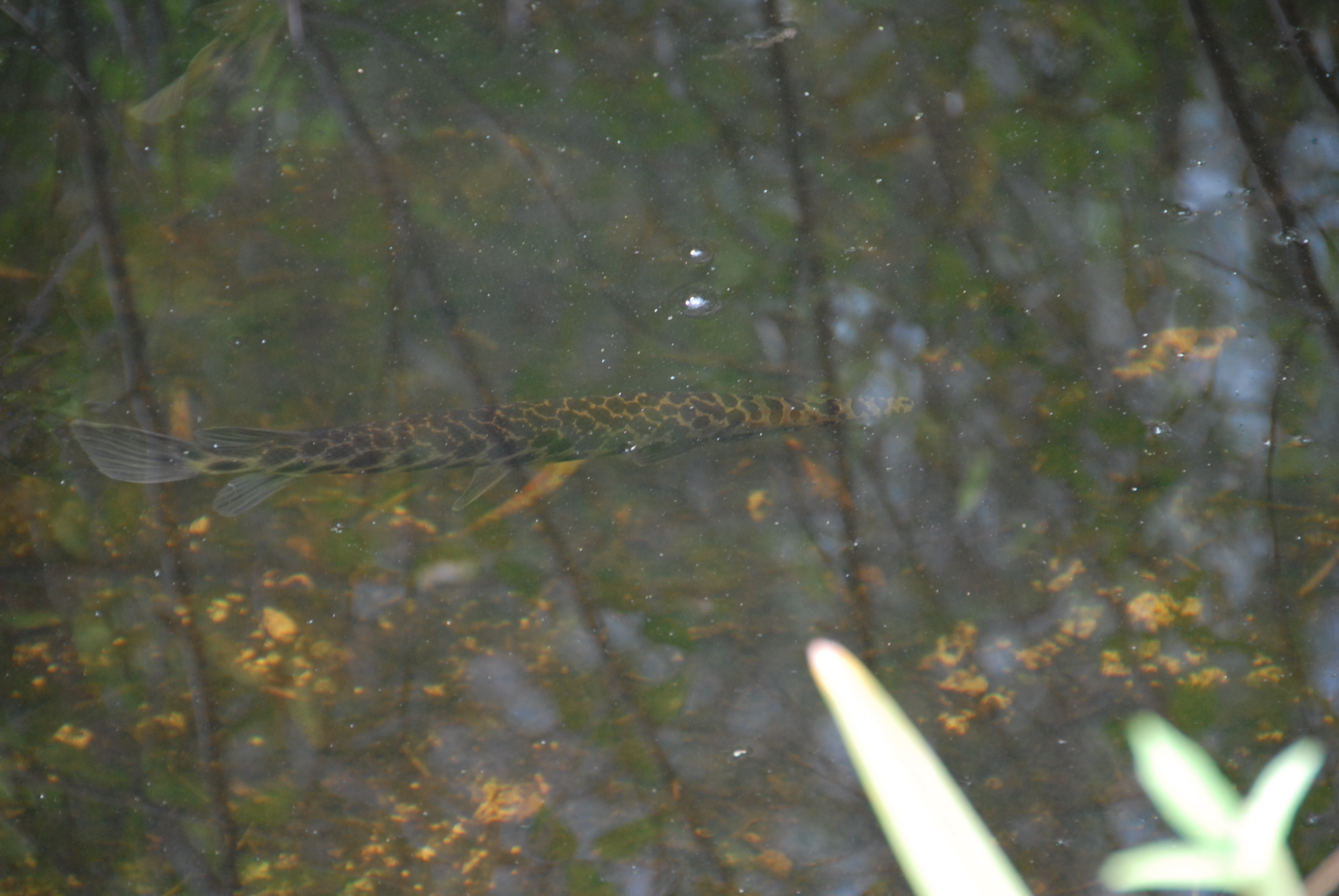

== Environment ==
They can be found in the Ochlockonee River and waters east and in peninsular Florida in medium to large lowland streams, canals, and lakes with muddy or sandy bottoms near underwater vegetation. They are often found in medium to shallow waters. They use an air bladder to breathe air which helps them survive in poorly oxygenated water. They sometimes will hide in weeds in 4–10 feet. Usually when you find them here, they will have their head in the weeds and will only show a small portion of the body. Some times they will be sitting on the edge of a weed bed. Here they will be about 3–8 inches below the surface. Usually the bottom will be 3 feet or more. It is also common to find them sitting in a marshy shoreline, these gar are typically 2 feet or more in length, with the bottom being no deeper than 6 inches. Larger specimens are rare, but are commonly found in swampy parts of lakes. These areas are never deeper than 6–8 feet.

== Reproduction ==
This occurs in late winter and early spring, with spawning typically occurring between February and March. Groups of both sexes come together in shallow, weedy water where the females discharge their adhesive eggs among the aquatic plants. Female's eggs are typically fertilized by multiple males. The hatched young possess an adhesive organ on the end of their snouts and stay attached to vegetation until about 0.8 in (2 cm) long. Following spawning in the late winter and early spring, male Florida gars undergo a decrease in their reproductive parameters throughout the summer. This includes a decrease in reproductive hormone levels and gonad maturation.

== Behavior ==
During the dry season, Florida gars burrow into the sediments of the marshes they inhabit and aestivate through the dry season. Aestivation, similar to hibernation in other species, lowers the animal's metabolic rate. This allows the Florida gar to withstand the high temperatures and dry conditions of their habitats during the summer.

== Feeding habits ==
Adult Florida gar are ambush predators; they stalk their prey and utilize a lateral lunge of their long heads in order to strike and catch their prey. These strikes are very short and fast, typically lasting for only 25 to 40 milliseconds in length. Upon catching their prey, the gar thrash their head from side to side to manipulate the prey before repositioning it to swallow it head first. Adult Florida gar tend to feed on fish, shrimp and crayfish, while young gar feed on zooplankton and insect larvae.

== See also ==
- List of fish species in Florida
