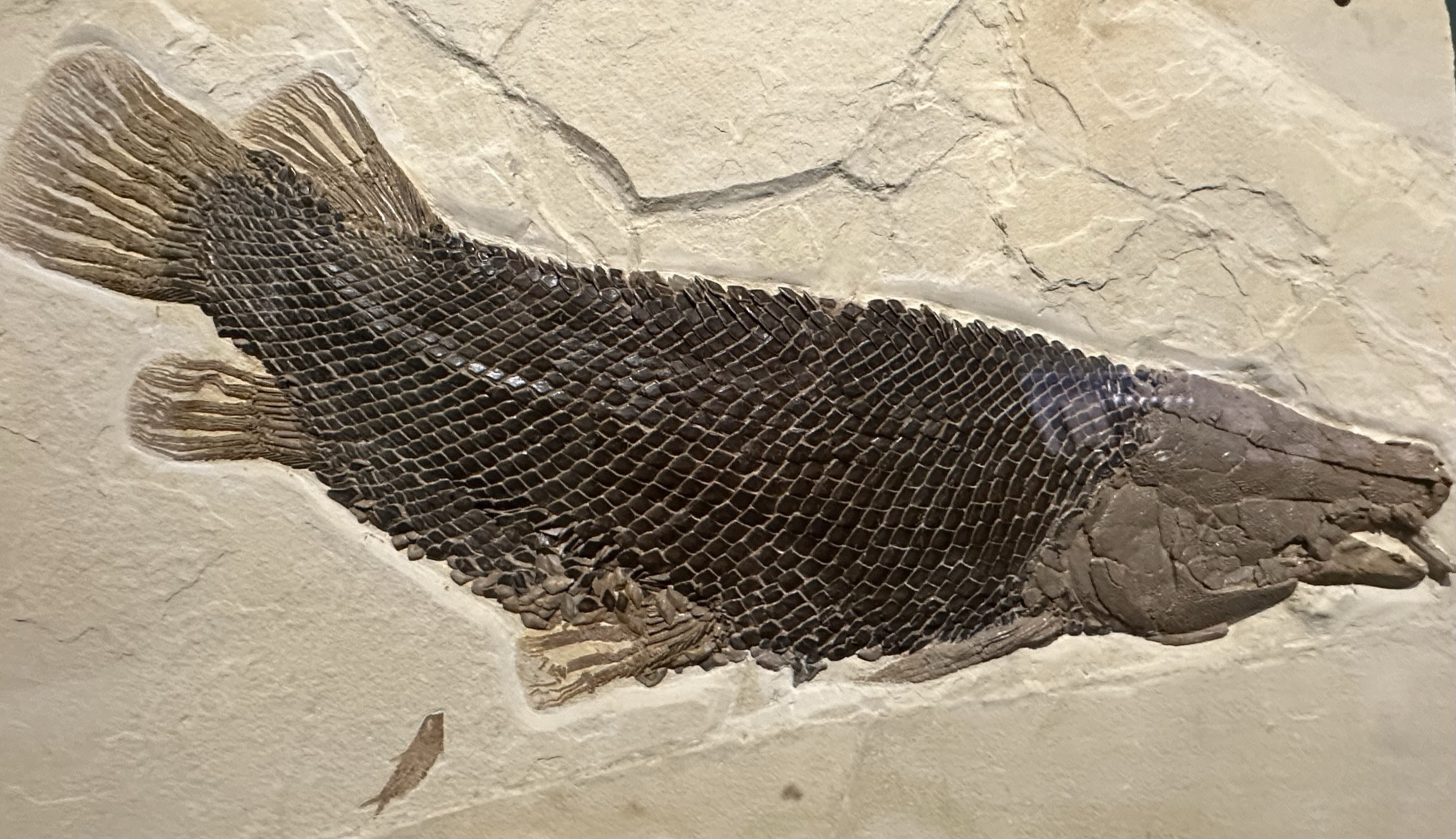
- M. janeae specimen at the Field Museum

Scientific classification
- Domain: Eukaryota
- Kingdom: Animalia
- Phylum: Chordata
- Class: Actinopterygii
- Clade: Ginglymodi
- Order: Lepisosteiformes
- Family: Lepisosteidae
- Genus: †Masillosteus; Micklich & Kappert, 2001

Species
- †Masillosteus janeae Grande, 2010; †Masillosteus kelleri Micklich & Kappert, 2001

= Masillosteus =

Masillosteus Temporal range: Early Eocene

Genus of fishes

Masillosteus ("bony one from Messel") is an extinct genus of gar that inhabited western North America and Europe during the Eocene. It is known from two species, each from a famous freshwater lagerstätte: M. kelleri from the Messel pit in the Messel Formation of Germany, and M. janeae from Fossil Butte in the Green River Formation of Wyoming. They are known from only a few specimens from both localities, and may have not been permanent inhabitants of the fossil lakes where they were preserved.

Masillosteus was an atypical gar with a short, broad snout and molariform teeth likely adapted to crushing crustaceans and other hard-shelled invertebrate prey. It shares the short, broad snout with the extinct gar Cuneatus, which inhabited western North America during the same time period; both genera are classified in the tribe Cuneatini. Although fossils of both genera are known only from the Paleogene, it is assumed that both diverged from one another during the Cretaceous.
