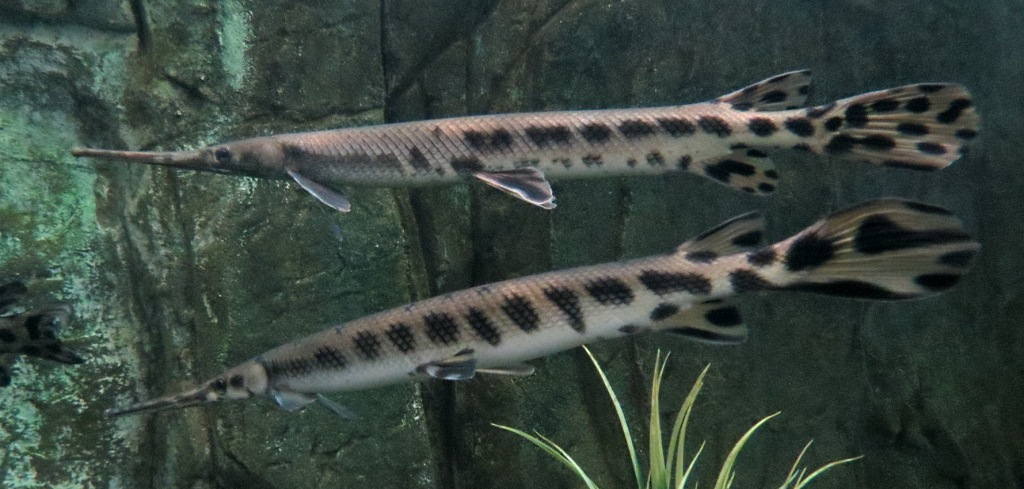
- Longnose gar, Lepisosteus osseus

Scientific classification
- Kingdom: Animalia
- Phylum: Chordata
- Class: Actinopterygii
- Clade: Ginglymodi
- Order: Lepisosteiformes
- Family: Lepisosteidae
- Genus: Lepisosteus; Lacépède, 1803

Species
- See text

Synonyms
- Acus Catesby, 1771 non Adams & Adams, 1853 non Chen, Yang & Wilson, 1989 non De Bomare, 1791 non Gray, 1847 non Humphrey, 1797 non Müller, 1766 non Müller, 1774 non Plumier, 1803 non (Swainson, 1839); Lepidosteus Koenig, 1825 [Agassiz, 1836; Lacépède, 1803]; Pneumatosteus Cope, 1869; Clastichthys Whitley, 1940; Clastes Cope, 1873 non Walckenaer, 1833; Cylindrosteus (Rafinesque, 1820); Lepisosteus (Cylindrosteus) Rafinesque, 1820; Psalidostomus Minding, 1832; Sarchirus Rafinesque, 1818; Sarcochirus Agassiz, 1846; Squammosa Catesby, 1771

= Lepisosteus =

Slender gars Temporal range: 77.5–0 Ma Campanian to present

Genus of fishes

Lepisosteus (from Greek lepis (λεπίς), 'scale' and osteon (ὀστέον), 'bone') is a genus of gars in the family Lepisosteidae. It contains four extant species, found throughout eastern and central North America. It is one of two extant gar genera alongside Atractosteus.

== Distribution ==
Lepisosteus is known to be a freshwater fish. However, they do have the ability to survive in high salinity, and low oxygen water after gulping air. Lepisosteus prefers to reside in brackish and shallow slow-moving waters, living usually in schools. The habitat range of this genus ranges on the Eastern coast from the Gulf of Mexico in Florida north to Quebec. Habitats can be found in the Missouri River Basin and Mississippi River drainage area, westward in the Rio Grande River basin of Southern Texas and Northern Mexico. There are also populations in the Great Lakes except for Lake Superior. Their range can occasionally reach out towards the Mobile Bay, Perdido Bay, and Mississippi Sound.

Lepisosteus appears to have a wider distribution in the past, as the extinct species L. bemisi inhabited intermountain lakes in the Green River Formation of what is now Wyoming, significantly west of the genus's modern range. The oldest record of the genus, a well-preserved skull from the Campanian, is known from the Oldman Formation of Canada. Even more removed from the genus's present distribution was L. indicus from the Maastrichtian-aged Lameta Formation and Intertrappean Beds of India. This species' inclusion in Lepisosteus is uncertain, as it was classified based on characteristics of the skull that were later found to be shared among many different gar taxa. However, phylogenies include it as more closely related to Lepisosteus than to Atractosteus or fossil gars. Indeterminate gar remains, most likely of Lepisosteus, from the Palana Formation of India suggest that the genus may have persisted in India up to the Late Paleocene.

== Description ==
These fish have ganoid scales on their elongated bodies with a single dorsal fin on the posterior side approximately one inch from their caudal fin. Depending on the clarity of the water, Lepisosteus colors will change. In clear water they can have bright colors of green and silvery-white; alternatively if the water is brackish and cloudy, their colors will be more of a brown hue. Hatchlings are approximately 8–10 mm in size. The average full-grown length of Lepisosteus varies from 34 to 78 inches depending on the species. In comparison to their long snouts, Lepisosteus have relatively small heads; however, their mouths full of sharp teeth.

== Life history ==
Lepisosteus is a slow-growing genus generally living a long time. Female gars take 6 years to reach sexual maturity, grow larger, and live up to 22 years. Male gars reach maturity around 3 or 4 years after hatching. The males do not often live longer than 11 years. The longnose gar will migrate upstream to smaller streams with faster-moving water to spawn and lay eggs. Fish of this genus that are newly hatched will attach themselves vertically to submerged objects by an adhesive disc on their snout. The youth stay attached to the objects until the yolk sac is absorbed which usually takes about 9 days. After the yolk sac of an egg is absorbed, the roe hatches. Hatchlings stabilize to a horizontal position, take their first aerial breath, and begin feeding.

== Diet ==
Because Lepisosteus has evolved to be a top predator, they are voracious eaters that eat a variety of other freshwater fish and crustaceans such as Ictiobus and blue crabs. Adults will float toward the surface of streams to scout prey that are below them while younger fish in this genus will hide in submersed vegetation to ambush hunt. Studies have found this native North American species is a predator of invasive Asian carp, whose habitat they share. This genus is not generally used for recreational hunting because their roe is toxic to humans. There are no significant threats to these top predators other than habitat loss. On the IUCN Red List of Threatened Species, this genus is listed as Least Concern.

== Taxonomy ==
=== Evolution ===
Phylogenetic evidence suggests that Lepisosteus is ancient genus that diverged from its only extant relative, Atractosteus, during the Early Cretaceous. As with Atractosteus, fossil evidence suggests that the ancestral range of the genus was likely centered around western North America during the Cretaceous and early Paleogene, until major climatic changes led to a shift in range to eastern North America by the late Paleogene.

=== Species ===
The currently recognized species are: Lepisosteus oculatus, Lepisosteus osseus, Lepisosteus platostomus, and Lepisosteus platyrhincus. Three species formerly classified in Lepisosteus (tropical gar, Cuban gar, and alligator gar) are now assigned to the genus Atractosteus.

Image	Species	Common name	Distribution
	L. oculatus Winchell, 1864	Spotted gar	North America
	L. osseus Linnaeus, 1758	Longnose gar	east coast of North and Central America in freshwater lakes, and as far west as Kansas and Texas and southern New Mexico
	L. platostomus Rafinesque, 1820	Shortnose gar	Montana to the west and the Ohio River to the east, southwards to the Gulf Coast.
	L. platyrhincus DeKay, 1842	Florida gar	USA from the Savannah River and Ochlockonee River watersheds of Georgia, and throughout peninsular Florida

==== Fossil species ====
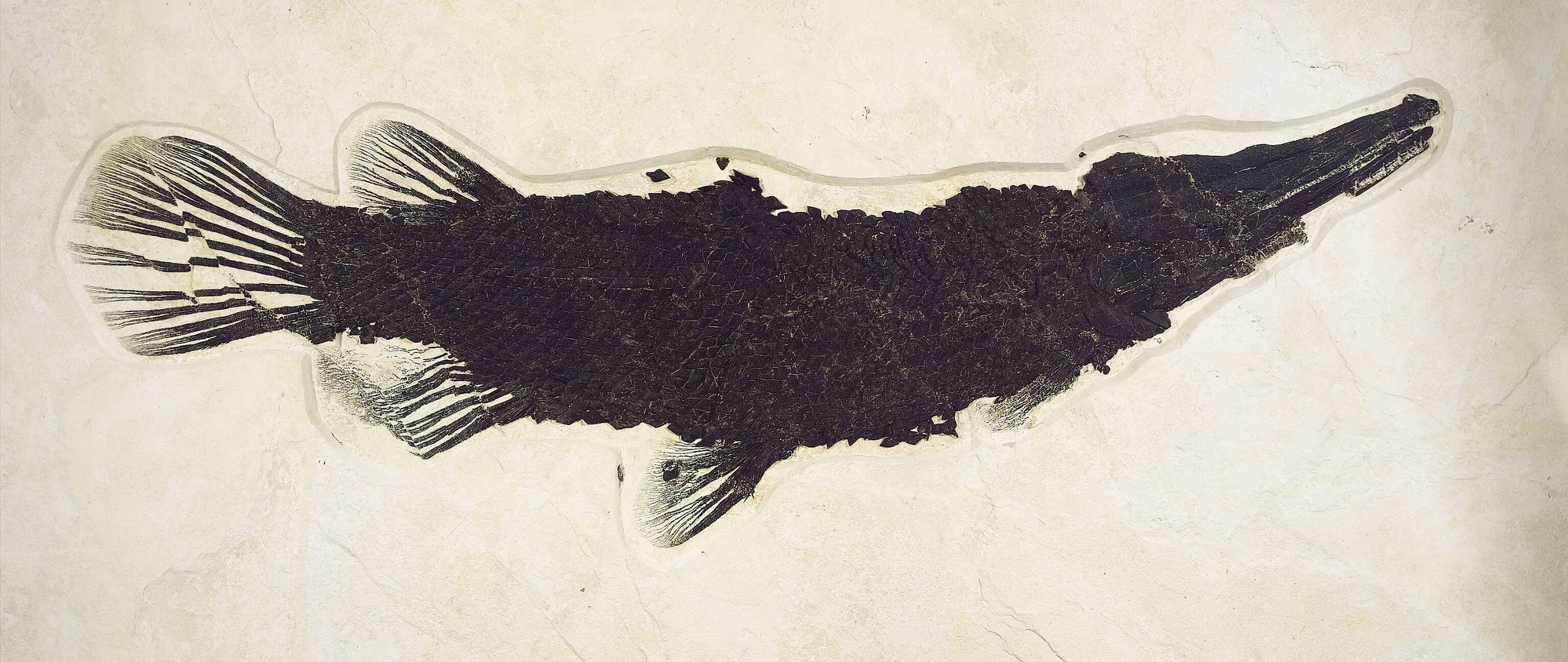
Fossil specimen of L. bemisi, an Eocene Lepisosteus from the Green River Formation

According to Grande, 2010. In addition, an indeterminate record (known as "Lepisosteus sp. A") is known from Campanian-aged Oldman Formation of Canada, and represents the oldest record of the genus.

- †Lepisosteus bemisi Grande, 2010
- †"Lepisosteus" indicus (Woodward, 1890) (classification in Lepisosteus uncertain, but most closely related to it)

==== Dubious fossil species ====
- †Lepisosteus aganus (Cope, 1877) Nomen dubium
- †Lepisosteus bohemicus (Laube, 1901) Nomen dubium
- †Lepisosteus cominatoi Santos, 1984 Nomen dubium
- †Lepisosteus cycliferus (Cope, 1873) Nomen dubium
- †Lepisosteus fimbriatus Wood, 1846 Nomen dubium
- †Lepisosteus glaber Marsh, 1871 Nomen nudum
- †Lepisosteus integer (Cope, 1877) Nomen dubium
- †Lepisosteus knieskerni Fowler, 1911 Nomen dubium
- †Lepisosteus longus Lambe, 1908 Nomen dubium
- †Lepisosteus nahunticus (Cope, 1869) Nomen dubium
- †Lepisosteus notabilis Leidy, 1873 Nomen dubium
- †Lepisosteus occidentalis Leidy, 1856 Nomen dubium
- †Lepisosteus opertus Estes, 1964 Nomen dubium
- †Lepisosteus strausi Kinkelin, 1884 Nomen dubium
- †Lepisosteus suessoniensis Gervais, 1888 Nomen nudum
- †Lepisosteus whitneyi Marsh, 1871 Nomen nudum

=== Phylogeny ===
- Lepisosteidae
  - Atractosteus
    - A. tropicus
    - - A. tristoechus
      - A. spatula
  - Lepisosteus
    - - L. oculatus
      - L. platyrhincus
    - - L. osseus
      - L. platostomus
