= Lance Grande =

Evolutionary biologist, curator and author of popular science books

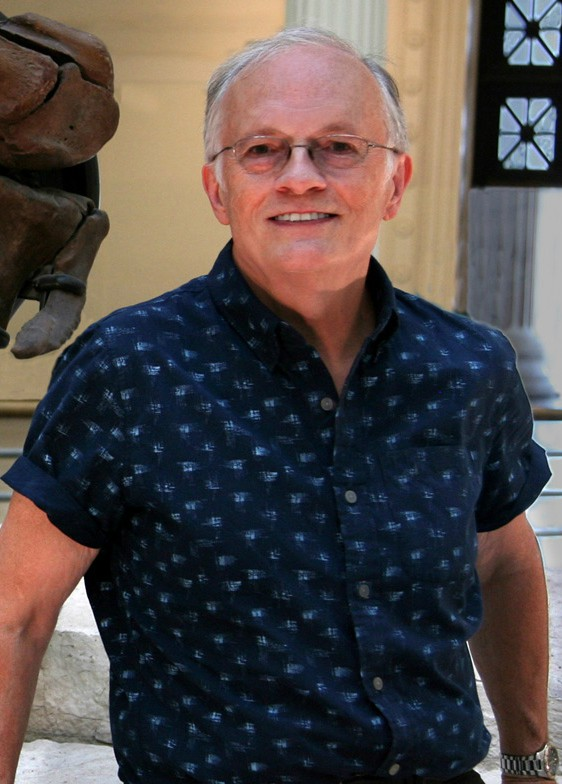
- Born: February 16, 1951 (age 75)

Academic background
- Education: BS Geology, 1976; MS Geology/Zoology, 1979; PhD Evolutionary Biology, 1983
- Doctoral advisors: Gareth Nelson; Donn Rosen

Roger Lansing Grande (born February 16, 1951), more commonly known as Lance Grande, is an evolutionary biologist and curatorial scientist. His research and work is focused on Paleontology, Ichthyology, Systematics and Evolution. He is well known for his work on the paleontology of the Green River Formation and for his detailed monographs on the comparative anatomy and evolution of ray-finned fishes. He has also published books on broader issues, engaging larger audiences on the importance of the natural and the social sciences.

Grande has won the PROSE award for Professional and Scholarly Excellence from the Association of American Publishers twice, for his books Gems and Gemstones and The Lost World of Fossil Lake. In 2012, he won the Robert H. Gibbs, Jr. Memorial Award from the American Society of Ichthyologists and Herpetologists "for an Outstanding Body of Published Work in Systematic Biology." In 2013, he was appointed as the Field Museum of Natural History's first Distinguished Service Curator, after serving eight and a half years as head of the museum's Collections and Research division and museum Senior Vice President. In 2018, he received the Honorary Lifetime Achievement Award from the Society of Vertebrate Paleontology. Grande received numerous research grants from National Science Foundation, Negaunee Foundation and Tawani Foundation. He named over 70 new species and higher taxa, publishing over 150 scientific books, monographs, and shorter papers. By 2024, ten different species had been named in his honor by various authors in scientific articles, including one Ordovician crinoid species, four Eocene bird species, and five fish species

== Early life and education ==
Grande grew up in Richfield, Minnesota. He developed an early interest in the natural world as a hobby. He collected fishes from a local pond, and rocks and fossils from local gravel pits. He worked his way through college for his bachelor's and master's degrees, working a variety of jobs ranging from US Army medic to working in a department store. He started with an Economics/Business major, but by the end of his junior year he had switched to natural history.

Grande received a BS in geology in 1976 and a double MS in Geology and Zoology in 1979 from the University of Minnesota. His master's thesis was on a group of 40 million- to 58 million-year-old fossil localities in western North America collectively known as the Green River Formation. In late 1978, he submitted part of his thesis to be published as a book, attracting the attention of Colin Patterson at the Natural History Museum in London. Patterson recommended him to his colleagues Gareth Nelson and Donn Rosen at the American Museum of Natural History in New York. As a consequence of that recommendation, Grande received a fellowship for a PhD program through the American Museum and the City University of New York under the guidance of Nelson and Rosen. Grande moved to New York and began the program in 1979 and received a PhD in evolutionary biology in 1983. His published Masters thesis later became an important work on the Green River Formation that by 2004 had gone through two editions and four printings.

== Career ==
In 1983, Grande was hired by the Field Museum in Chicago as curator of fossil fishes, where he continued working for the next several decades. Over the years he has been a content specialist for some of the Field Museum's most successful exhibits, including Evolving Planet and The Grainger Hall of Gems. He has led over 60 expeditions to prospect for and collect fossils in Wyoming, Colorado, Utah, and Mexico. During his curatorship the fossil fish collection of the museum more than doubled in size. Over much of his research career, Grande collaborated with Willy Bemis, on the comparative anatomy and evolution of ray-finned fishes (Actinopterygii). Grande and Bemis built an integrative project lasting more than 15 years in an attempt to better understand the base of the evolutionary tree for ray-finned fishes. With funding from the National Science Foundation, they traveled to 12 different countries and 14 different states to study museum collections, resulting in a number of influential publications. A 1998 article in Science magazine called their collaborative work "a model of what should be done to carry comparative biology [into] the 21st century." They also published a comparative anatomy text book with two other coauthors that was adopted by many universities across the United States.

Grande served as Senior Vice President of Field Museum and head of Collections and Research from 2004 through 2013. In 2008 he received the James A. Lovell Award from the Planetary Studies Foundation for helping to create The Robert A. Pritzker Center for Meteoritic and Polar Studies at the Field Museum.

Grande was an adjunct professor at the University of Illinois at Chicago, a lecturer at the University of Chicago, and a research associate at the American Museum of Natural History in New York. He was one of the founding members on the executive committee for The Encyclopedia of Life from 2010 through 2013. He also served on the board of trustees for The Chicago Council of Science and Technology (founding member and chair of programming committee), on the Visiting Committee for the Graham School of Continuing Liberal and Professional Studies, where he was a founding member, and on the University of Chicago Committee on Evolutionary Biology.

== Books ==
For the bulk of his early career, Grande wrote monographs and articles geared towards other scientists and graduate students. During his time as an administrator of the Field Museum, he came to realize that many people did not understand the role and importance of natural history museum research scientists. As a result, in 2009 he began publishing books aimed at broader audiences about the importance and appeal of science and natural history museum research. His first book on the topic was entitled Gems and Gemstones: Timeless Natural Beauty of the Mineral World, which was published in 2009 with co-author Allison Augustyn. A second book entitled The Lost World of Fossil Lake: Snapshots from Deep Time was published in 2013. Both books won the American Publisher's Award for Professional and Scholarly Excellence.

In 2017, he published Curators: Behind the Scenes of Natural History Museums. Kirkus Reviews wrote that the book is "certain to appeal to aspiring curators as well as anyone who has wondered what goes on behind the exhibitions." On the book's back cover, the Director of the Smithsonian National Museum of Natural History wrote, "Lance Grande has lived his life as a natural history museum curator, a profession that emerged in the nineteenth century. His memoir shines a bright light on this profession, its roots, and its place in the twenty-first century"

In 2024, he published "The Evolution of Religions. A History of Related Traditions." This book advocates for the use of modern evolutionary theory and philosophy to decipher the deep history of culture, using history of religion studies as a test case. It points out that modern evolutionary analysis is simply a search for group relationships and diversification patterns over time, rather than the older, more subjective notion of searching for innate "ladders of progress". The book contains a plea for a broader pluralistic tolerance and understanding of cultural diversity, and contends that this could forestall the extinction of our own species.

== Awards and honors ==
- 2008 - The James A. Lovell Award
- 2009 - American Publishers Award for Professional and Scholarly Excellence.
- 2012 - Robert H. Gibbs, Jr. Memorial Award.
- 2013 - American Publishers Award for Professional and Scholarly Excellence.
- 2018 - Honorary Member Award from the Society of Vertebrate Paleontology.

== Bibliography ==
=== Books ===
- (Editor) Interpreting the Hierarchy of Nature: From Systematic Patterns to Evolutionary Process Theories. ISBN 978-0122951206 (1994) Academic Press.
- (Co-author) Functional Anatomy of the Vertebrates: An Evolutionary Perspective (third edition). ISBN 978-0030223693 (2001) Harcourt Press.
- Gems and Gemstones: Timeless Natural Beauty of the Mineral World. ISBN 978-0-226-30511-0 (2009) University of Chicago Press.
- The Lost World of Fossil Lake: Snapshots from Deep Time. ISBN 978-0-226-92296-6 (2013) University of Chicago Press.
- Curators: Behind the Scenes of Natural History Museums. ISBN 978-0-226-19275-8 (2017) University of Chicago Press. (Later also released in abridged Korean and Chinese translations.)
- The Evolution of Religions. A History of Related Traditions. ISBN 978-023121651-7 (2024) Columbia University Press.

=== Scientific monographs ===
- The paleontology of the Green River Formation with a review of the fish fauna. Second Edition (First edition, 1980). Geological Survey of Wyoming, pp. 1–334. (1984)
- Recent and fossil clupeomorph fishes with materials for revision of the subgroups of clupeoids. Bull. Amer. Mus. Nat. Hist., vol. 181: 231–373. (1985)
- with William Bemis: Osteology and phylogenetic relationships of fossil and Recent paddlefishes (Polyodontidae) with comments on the interrelationships of Acipenseriformes. Society of Vertebrate Paleontology Memoir 1: 1–121. (1991)
- with William Bemis: A comprehensive phylogenetic study of amiid fishes (Amiidae) based on comparative skeletal anatomy. An empirical search for interconnected patterns of natural history. Society of Vertebrate Paleontology Memoir 4: 1–690. (1998)
- with Marcelo Carvalho and John Maisey: Freshwater stingrays of the Green River Formation of Wyoming (Early Eocene), with the description of a new genus and species and an analysis of its phylogenetic relationships (Chondrichthyes: Myliobatiformes). Bulletin of the American Museum of Natural History, 284:1-136. (2004)
- An empirical synthetic pattern study of gars and closely related species (Lepisosteiformes) based mostly on skeletal anatomy: The resurrection of Holostei. American Society of Ichthyologists and Herpetologists, Special Publication 7: 1–874. Allen Press. (2010)
- with Eric Hilton and William Bemis: Skeletal anatomy of the shortnose sturgeon, Acipenser brevirostrum Lesueur, 1818, and the systematics of sturgeons (Acipenseriformes, Acipenseridae). Fieldiana, Life and Earth Sciences 3:1-185. (2011)

=== Selected Scientific Journal and Magazine Articles ===
- The use of paleontology in systematics and biogeography, and a time control refinement for historical biogeography. Paleobiology, vol. 11, no. 2, pp. 1–11. (1985)
- with Joseph Eastman: A review of the Antarctic ichthyofaunas, in light of new fossil discoveries. Palaeontology, vol. 29: 113–137. (1986)
- Locked in stone: an extinct 50-million-year-old lake system. Natural History magazine, New York 107:66-69. (1998)
- Fossils, phylogeny, and Patterson's Rule. Journal of the Linnean Society, Supplement, Special Issue 2:24-32. (2000)
- Categorizing various classes of morphological variation, and the importance of this to vertebrate paleontology. Mesozoic Fishes 3: 123–136. (2004)
- with Christian Kammerer and Mark Westneat: Comparative and developmental jaw mechanics of gars (Lepisosteidae). Journal of Morphology, 267:1017-1031. (2006)
- with Eric Hilton: An exquisitely preserved fossil sturgeon (Acipenseriformes: Acipenseridae: gen. et sp. nov.) from the Upper Cretaceous Judith River Formation of Montana. Memoir 4, Journal of Vertebrate Paleontology, 80:1-40. (2006)
- with 29 co-authors: Taxonomic impediment or impediment to taxonomy? A commentary on systematics and cybertaxonomic-automation paradigm. Evolutionary Biology 34: 140–143. (2007)
- The evolution of evolution, and the museum's role in evolutionary studies. In the Field 78 (3): 10-13 (2007).
- With William Bemis and Eric Findeis: An overview of Acipenseriformes. Environmental Biology of Fishes. 48: 25–71.
- To the land of petrified fish. American Paleontologist 16:14–17. (2008)
- with Daniel Ksepka, Julia Clark, and Sterling Nesbit: Fossil Evidence of wing shape in a Stem Relative of Swifts and Hummingbirds (Aves, Panapodiformes). Proceedings of the Royal Society B. 2013: 1–8. (2013)
- with 24 co-authors: Does counting species count as taxonomy? On misrepresenting systematics, yet again. Cladistics. 30:322-329. (2014)
- Donn Rosen and the Perils of Paleontology. pp. 159–168 in: (Crowther, B. and Parenti, L, eds.) Assumptions Inhibiting Progress in Comparative Biology. CRC Press. (2016)
- The Curator. Natural History 125 (11): 48.
