= Atractosteus grandei =

Atractosteus grandei Temporal range: Earliest Paleocene, 66–65.9 Ma

Scientific classification
- Kingdom: Animalia
- Phylum: Chordata
- Class: Actinopterygii
- Clade: Ginglymodi
- Order: Lepisosteiformes
- Family: Lepisosteidae
- Genus: Atractosteus
- Species: †A. grandei

Binomial name
- †Atractosteus grandei Brownstein & Lyson, 2022
- North Dakota, USA highlighted in red

Extinct species of fish

Atractosteus grandei is an extinct species of gar in the family Lepisosteidae. Remains have been found in Lower Paleogene sediments from North Dakota. A. grandei belonged to the genus Atractosteus which includes modern day species of gars such as the giant alligator gar (Atractosteus spatula) and the tropical gar (Atractosteus tropicus). It is named after paleontologist and ichthyologist Lance Grande.

== Taxonomy ==
A 2026 study, of which Tyler Lyson (one of the original descriptors of the species) was a co-author, found A. grandei to be morphologically identical to Atractosteus simplex from the Early Eocene of North America, which would potentially make A. grandei a synonym of A. simplex. Although a significant 15-million-year time gap exists between both species, individual gar species are known to have long stratigraphic ranges due to their slow rate of morphological evolution, which would further support both being the same species.

== Description ==
A. grandei was a large-bodied gar, reaching 1.4–1.5 m (4.6–4.9 ft) in body length. The species existed approximately 1500–2500 years after the Cretaceous–Paleogene extinction event that killed of most large life on Earth. Atractosteus grandei was a macropredator. It had rhomboid ganoid (fish) scales, a weakly ornamented skull roof and opisthocoelous vertebrae. The body shape of A. grandei had a slender torpedo like body with long snouts and lots of teeth used to hunt prey of freshwater ecosystems.

== Discovery ==
Atractosteus grandei was discovered in Williston Basin of North Dakota, and described in June 2022. The fossil was 18 cm (7.1 in) above the Cretaceous–Paleogene extinction event boundary about 66 million years ago, making the specimen of A. grandei the oldest known articulated vertebrate fossil from the Cenozoic. The discovery of Atractosteus grandei suggest that freshwater ecosystems recovered quickly after the asteroid impact that killed of the non-avian dinosaurs.

== See also ==
- Atractosteus africanus (Arambourg & Joleaud, 1943), a species of late Cretaceous period extinct gar that lived in France
