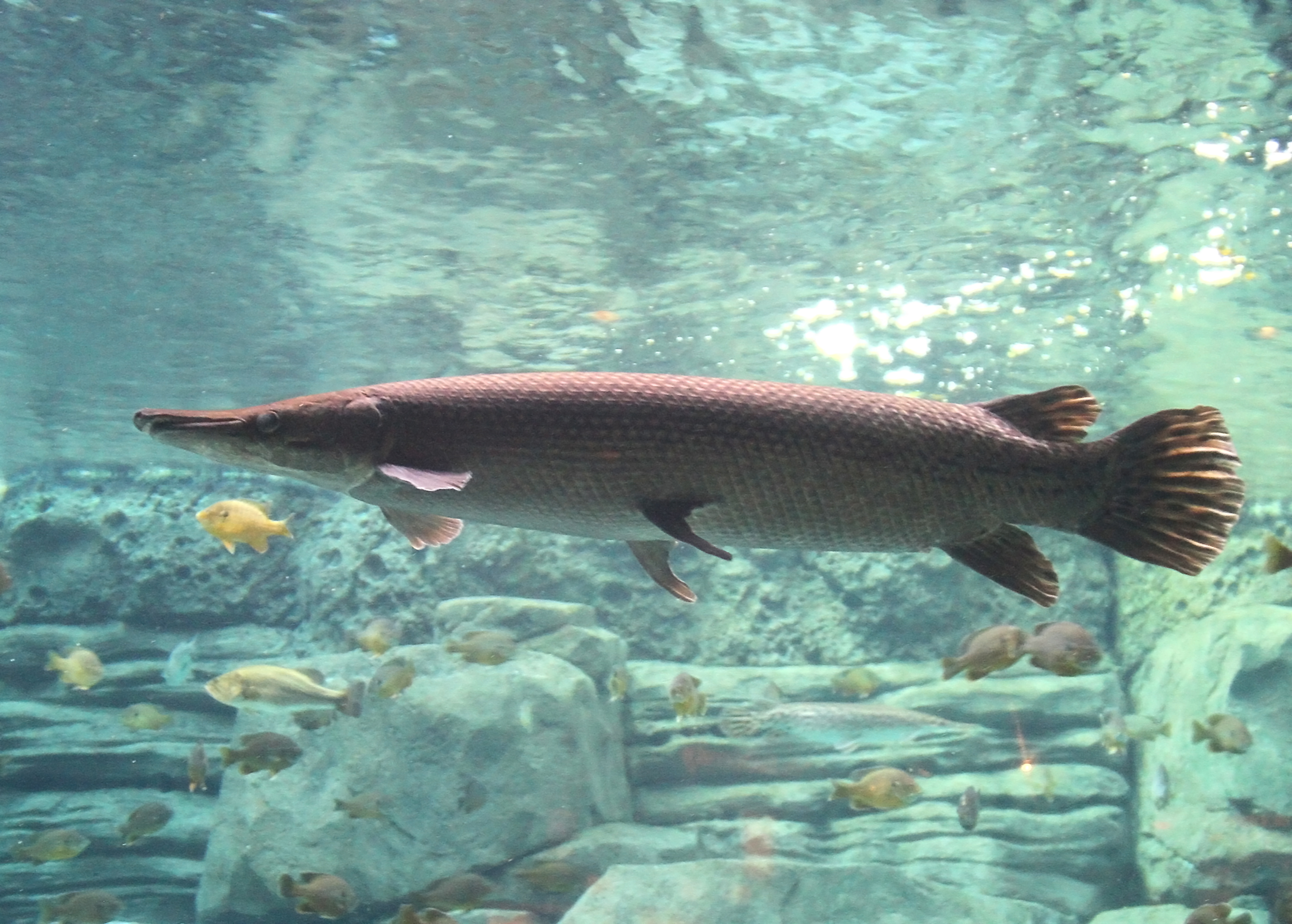
- Alligator gar

Scientific classification
- Kingdom: Animalia
- Phylum: Chordata
- Class: Actinopterygii
- Clade: Ginglymodi
- Order: Lepisosteiformes
- Family: Lepisosteidae
- Genus: Atractosteus (Rafinesque, 1820)

Type species
- Esox spatula Lacépède, 1803

Species
- See text

Synonyms
- Lepisosteus (Atractosteus) Rafinesque 1820; Litholepis Rafinesque 1818

= Atractosteus =

Large gars Temporal range: ~Santonian–Present, 86.3–0 Ma

Genus of fishes

Atractosteus (from Greek atraktos (ἀτρακτὀς), 'spindle' and osteon (ὀστέον), 'bone') is a genus of gars in the family Lepisosteidae, with three extant species. It is one of two surviving gar genera alongside Lepisosteus.

The three surviving species are all widely separated from one another, with A. spatula being found in the south-central United States, A. tropicus in southern Mexico and Central America, and A. tristoechus in Cuba. Although generally inhabiting fresh water, they are tolerant of marine conditions.

== Evolution ==
The genus first appeared during the Santonian stage of the Late Cretaceous, having diverged from Lepisosteus earlier in the Cretaceous. It quickly achieved a widespread distribution throughout the rest of the Cretaceous, being known from North America, South America and Europe. Atractosteus survived the Cretaceous-Paleogene extinction event, with one articulated fossil of the species A. grandei being recovered from strata dated to just a few thousand years after the extinction event, making it the oldest known articulated vertebrate fossil from the Cenozoic. It was found throughout North America and Europe during the Paleogene, but by the Neogene this had shrunk to only certain parts of North America, where it is still found today.

== Systematics ==
- Lepisosteidae
  - Atractosteus
    - A. tropicus
    - - A. tristoechus
      - A. spatula
  - Lepisosteus
    - - L. oculatus
      - L. platyrhincus
    - - L. osseus
      - L. platostomus

=== Species ===
==== Extant species ====
Image	Scientific name	Common name	Distribution
	Atractosteus spatula Lacépède, 1803	Alligator gar	Southern United States
	Atractosteus tristoechus Bloch & J. G. Schneider, 1801	Cuban gar	Western Cuba and the Isla de la Juventud
	Atractosteus tropicus T. N. Gill, 1863	Tropical gar	Southern Mexico to Costa Rica

==== Fossil species ====
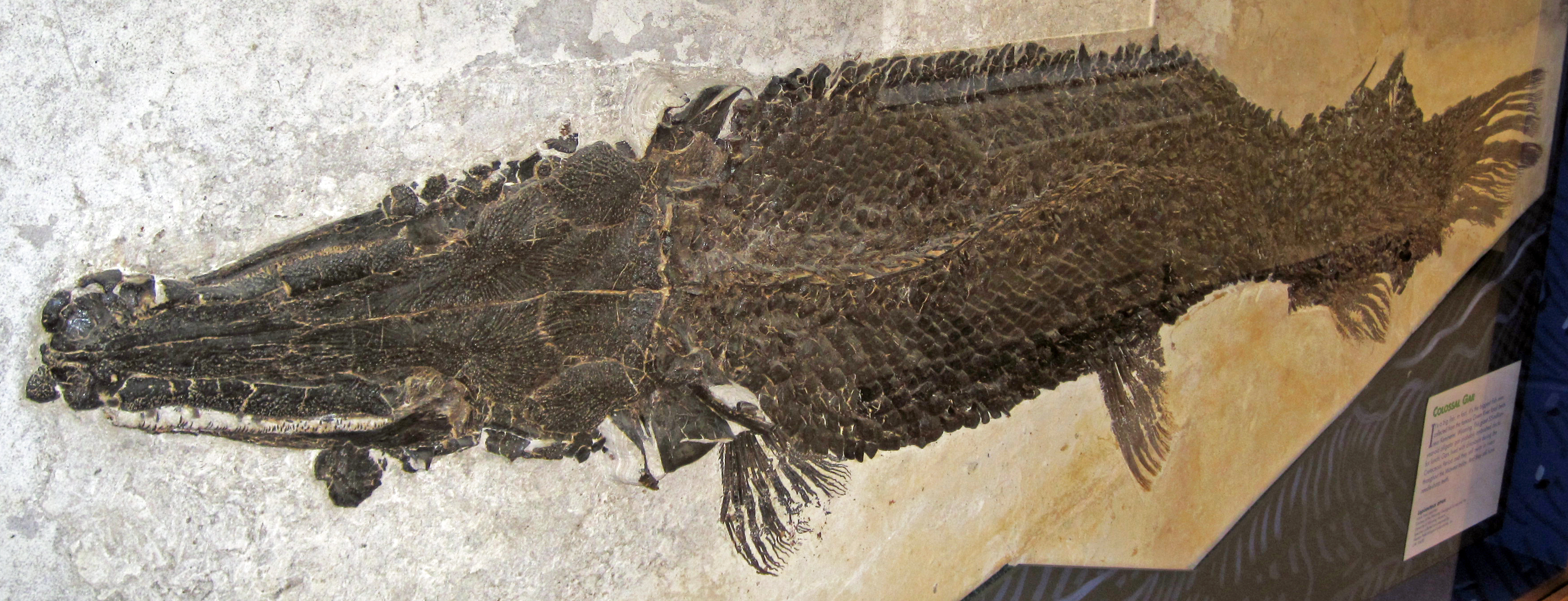
Specimen of A. atrox, an Eocene-aged fossil species from the Green River Formation

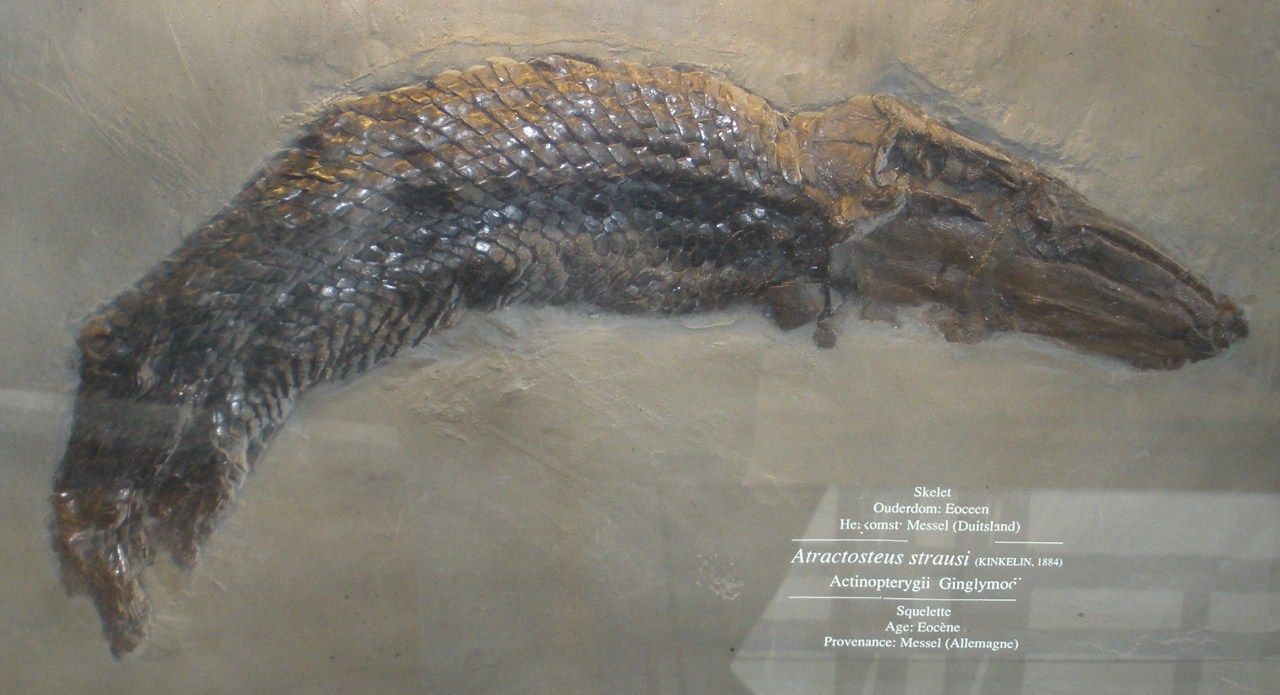
Specimen of the Eocene-aged European species A. messelensis (=A. strausi)

The following fossil species are known:

- †Atractosteus atrox (Leidy, 1873)
- †Atractosteus grandei Brownstein & Lyson, 2022
- †Atractosteus messelensis Grande 2010
- †Atractosteus simplex (Leidy 1873)
- †Atractosteus turanensis Nessov & Panteleeva, 1999

Former fossil species:

- †Atractosteus cuneatus (Cope 1884) non (Cope 1878) (now in Cuneatus)
- †Atractosteus falipoui (Cavin & Brito 2001) (now in Oniichthys)

==== Dubious fossil species ====
- †"Atractosteus" africanus (Arambourg & Joleaud, 1943) (nomen dubium, placement in Atractosteus disputed, often placed in the dubious genus Paralepisosteus)
- †"Atractosteus" emmonsi Hay 1929 (Miocene of North Carolina, nomen dubium)
- †"Atractosteus" lapidosus Hay 1919 (Pleistocene of Florida, nomen dubium)
- †Atractosteus occidentalis (Leidy 1856) non Wiley 1976 (Campanian of Montana, nomen dubium)

The extinct nomen dubium fossil species A. strausi (Kinkelin, 1884) is based on a single Miocene-aged gar scale from Germany, and has often been used as the species for the Atractosteus gars from the older Messel Formation. Although this scale provides evidence for gars surviving in Europe as late as the Miocene, it is not diagnostic enough to be considered a member of Atractosteus, nor can the Messel gars (now placed in A. messelensis) be confidently placed in it.
