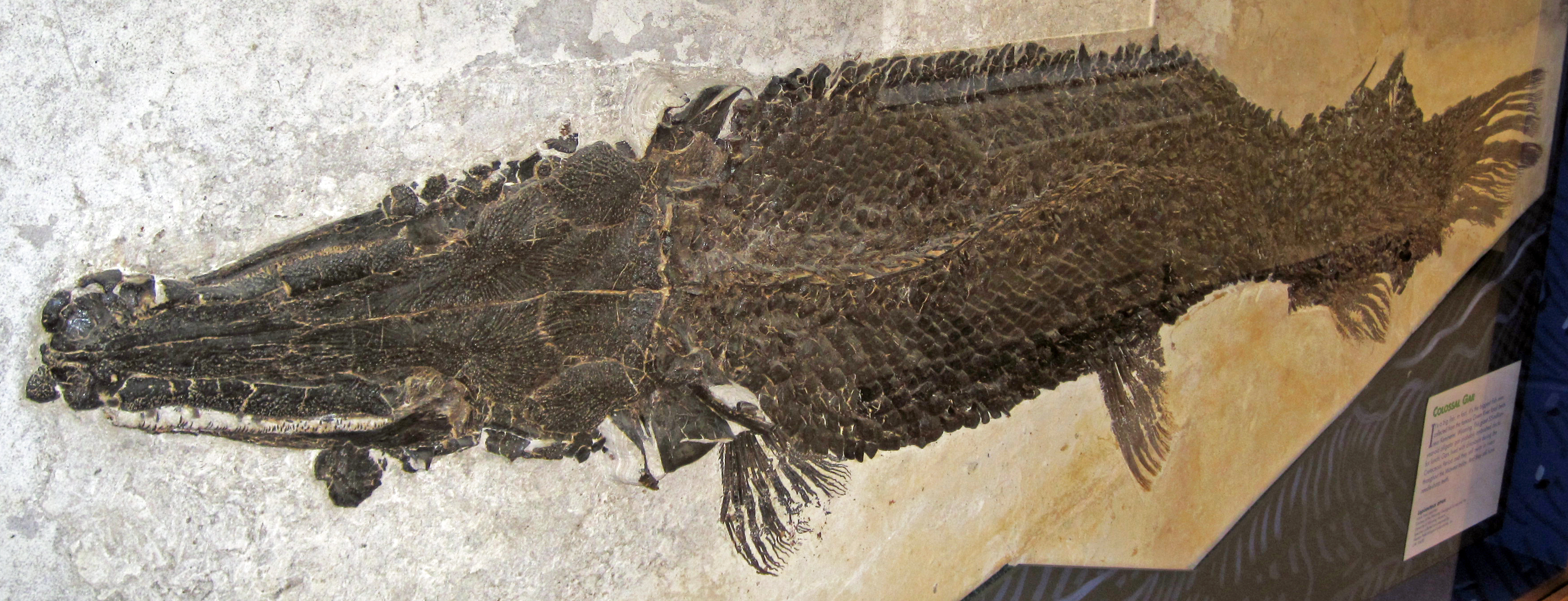
- The largest known A. atrox specimen, University of Wyoming

Scientific classification
- Kingdom: Animalia
- Phylum: Chordata
- Class: Actinopterygii
- Clade: Ginglymodi
- Order: Lepisosteiformes
- Family: Lepisosteidae
- Genus: Atractosteus
- Species: †A. atrox

Binomial name
- †Atractosteus atrox (Leidy, 1873)

Synonyms
- Lepisosteus atrox Leidy, 1873

= Atractosteus atrox =

Atractosteus atrox Temporal range: Early Eocene

Extinct species of fish

Atractosteus atrox (from atrox, Latin for 'savage'), the Green River atrox gar, is an extinct species of gar from the Early Eocene of western North America. It is known from many well-preserved specimens found in the famous Fossil Butte deposits of the Green River Formation in Wyoming, US, in addition to a possible vertebra from the Bridger Formation.

A close relative of the modern alligator gar (A. spatula), it is the largest fish known from the Green River deposits, with two specimens known to reach at least 7 feet (2.1 m) in length, making A. atrox the largest known prehistoric gar taxon. It is one of two Atractosteus species known from Fossil Butte alongside A. simplex, from which it can be differed by the characteristic ornamentation on its skull bones, in addition to its larger size. There is still significant variation within this species, and it is thus possible that it may represent multiple cryptic species.

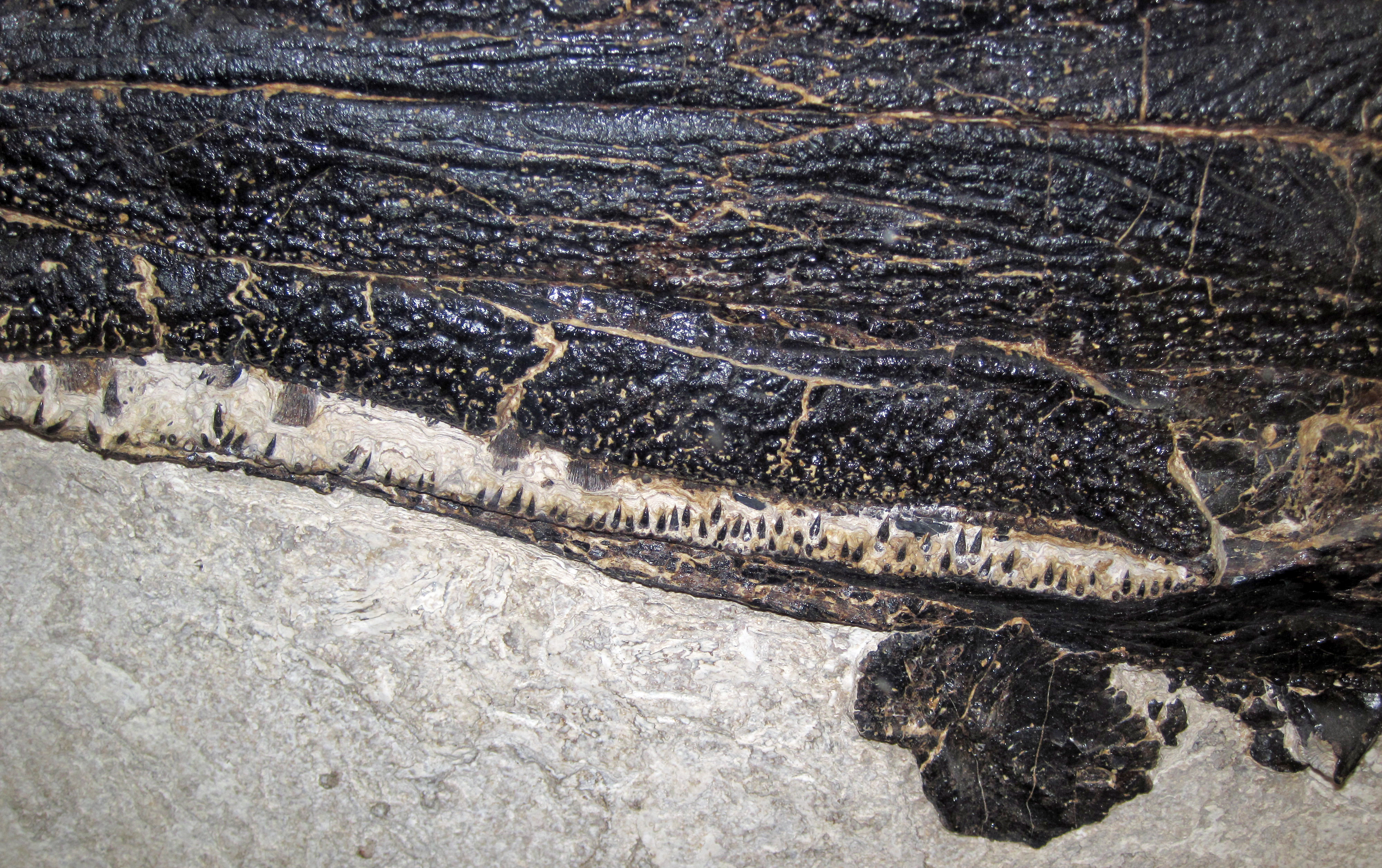
Close-up of A. atrox teeth

The original type specimen is a single vertebra recovered from the Bridger Formation, which Leidy (1873) named A. atrox, a name he also used for the well-preserved Green River Formation gars. However, this vertebra cannot be confidently assigned to A. atrox and may belong to A. simplex instead; for this reason, Eastman (1900) fixed the name to a more complete Green River specimen instead, which was treated as the "effective type" specimen.
