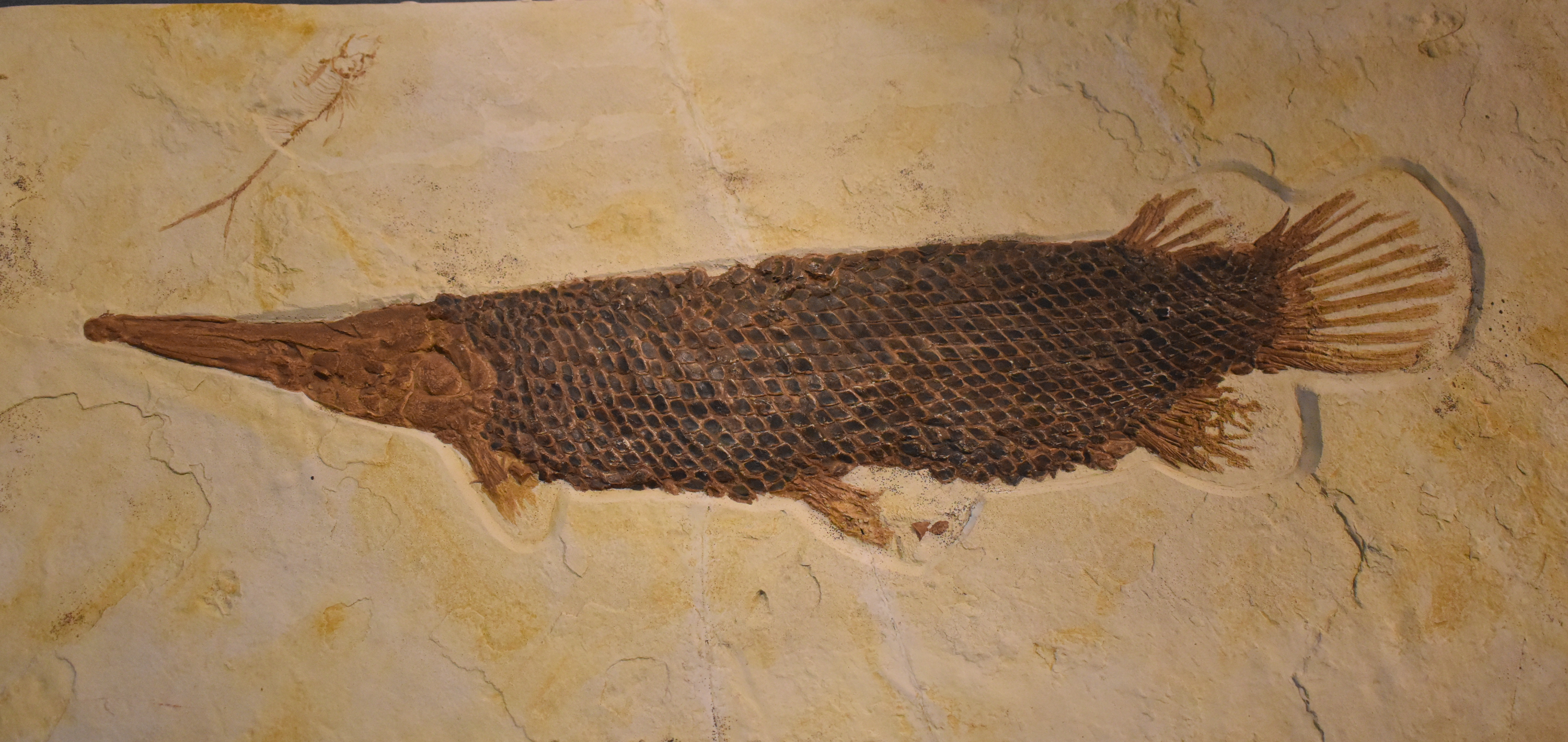
- Fossil specimen, University of Wyoming

Scientific classification
- Kingdom: Animalia
- Phylum: Chordata
- Class: Actinopterygii
- Clade: Ginglymodi
- Order: Lepisosteiformes
- Family: Lepisosteidae
- Genus: Atractosteus
- Species: †A. simplex

Binomial name
- †Atractosteus simplex (Leidy, 1873)

Synonyms
- Lepisosteus simplex Leidy, 1873; ?Atractosteus grandei Brownstein & Lyson, 2022

= Atractosteus simplex =

Atractosteus simplex Temporal range: Early Eocene Possible earliest Paleocene occurrence

Extinct species of fish

Atractosteus simplex (from simplex, Latin for "simple", likely referring to the smooth scales), the simplex gar, is an extinct species of gar from the Early Eocene of western North America. It is known from many well-preserved specimens found in the famous Fossil Butte deposits of the Green River Formation in Wyoming, US.

It was a close relative of the modern alligator gar (A. spatula), and one of two Atractosteus species known from Fossil Butte alongside the even larger A. atrox. It can be differentiated from the sympatric A. atrox by its lower number of lateral line scales and vertebrae, and reaching only 1 metre (3.3 ft) in length. It is the most abundant of the six gar species known from the Green River Formation, although even the 100-200 excavated specimens of this species are a minute percentage of the over 500,000 fossil fish specimens recovered from the formation.

A. simplex was a highly predatory fish, with one fossil specimen preserving a young Diplomystus in its jaws. Another specimen preserves coprolites in its mouth, representing the first instance of coprolites being found within a fossilized vertebrate's mouth. As gars are not known to engage in coprophagy, this is thought to likely represent an accidental ingestion or a consequence of taphonomy.

The original type specimen is a skull fragment and some vertebrae recovered from the Bridger Formation, which Leidy (1873) named A. simplex, a name he also used for the well-preserved Green River Formation gars. However, this vertebra cannot be confidently assigned to A. simplex and may belong to A. atrox or Lepisosteus bemisi instead; for this reason, Eastman (1900) fixed the name to a more complete Green River specimen instead, which was treated as the "effective type" specimen.

A 2026 study found that Atractosteus grandei, a fossil gar from the Fort Union Formation, known from an individual that lived just 2,000 years after the Cretaceous-Paleogene extinction event, was morphologically identical to A. simplex and may represent the same species. If accurate, this extends the stratigraphic range of A. simplex to the very beginning of the Paleocene and makes it the earliest Cenozoic vertebrate known from articulated remains.
