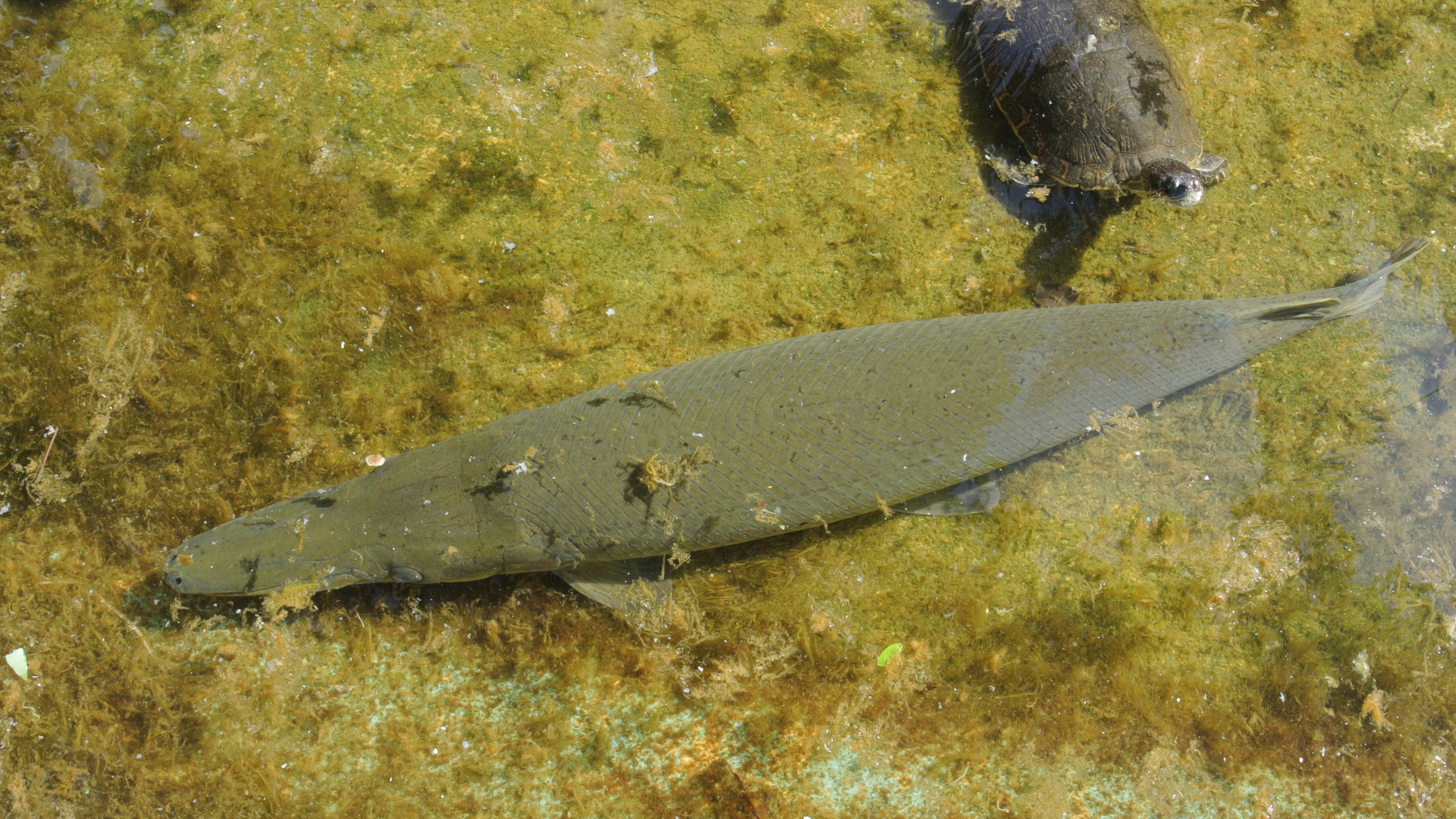

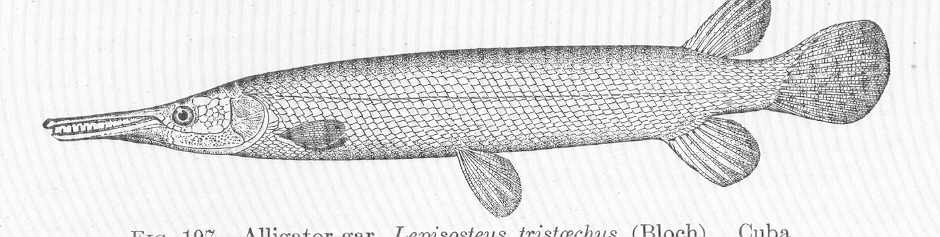

Conservation status
- Critically Endangered (IUCN 3.1)

Scientific classification
- Kingdom: Animalia
- Phylum: Chordata
- Class: Actinopterygii
- Clade: Ginglymodi
- Order: Lepisosteiformes
- Family: Lepisosteidae
- Genus: Atractosteus
- Species: A. tristoechus

Binomial name
- Atractosteus tristoechus (Bloch & Schneider, 1801)
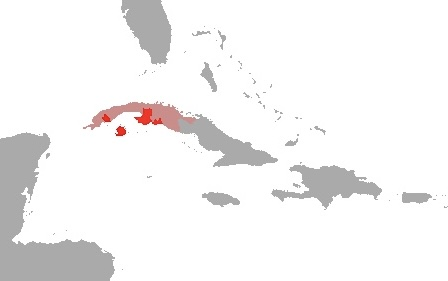

Synonyms
- Esox tristoechus Bloch & Schneider, 1801; Lepisosteus tristoechus (Bloch & Schneider, 1801); Lepidosteus manjuari Poey, 1853

= Cuban gar =

Species of fish

The Cuban gar (Atractosteus tristoechus), also known as the manjuarí, is a fish in the family Lepisosteidae. It is a tropical, freshwater species, although it also inhabits brackish water. It is found in rivers and lakes of western Cuba and the Isla de la Juventud. The flesh of the fish is edible, but the eggs are poisonous for humans.

Cuban gar spawn seasonally in the floodplains of large rivers.

== Behavior ==
Cuban gar typically hunt alone and avoid other members of their species. The exception to this is during spawning season, when larger parties of around 20 gar form to hunt. Sometimes, the groups break up into smaller groups, and two to eight males accompany a female. Atractosteus gar species generally have sex ratios skewed towards males (in the cases of tropical gar or alligator gar), although research has yet to show this trend in the Cuban gar.

== Morphology ==
Adult Cuban gars are typically around 1 m (3.3 ft) in length, but can grow as large as 2 m (6.6 ft). There is no known variance in length relative to sex. This places it as the second largest extant species of gar, after the alligator gar.

The Cuban gar, along with other species of gar, is also notable for its high tolerance of high ammonia and nitrate levels in water, its ability to breathe some atmospheric air in absence of sufficiently oxygenated water, and its disease resistance.

=== Larval development ===
After hatching, Cuban gar larvae undergo three stages of organogenesis and development: attached (days 1–3), transitional (days 4–10), and free-swimming (days 11–18). During the attached stage, the larvae develop rudimentary intestines, stomachs, pancreases, and esophagi that help the larvae transition from feeding off the egg yolk to normal feeding, which begins during the transitional phase. The transitional phase is marked by further development of these organs and a lack of obvious yolk.

During this phase, teeth also develop. Once separation occurs between the stomach and intestines—increased organ size and complexity, and completely exotrophic behavior has arisen—the larvae are considered "free swimming". While they are larvae, Cuban gar grow from around 1.5 cm (0.6 in) in length in the attached phase, to 4 cm (1.6 in) in length in the free-swimming phase.

== Ecology ==
Like other species of gars, Cuban gar are top-level predators in freshwater ecosystems. Adults feed on freshwater fishes and birds. Young are prey to the introduced largemouth bass (Micropterus salmoides). As an animal with a high trophic level, the gar has lost much of its population due to overfishing and habitat loss. Attempts to restore natural fish populations using them in aquaculture are currently in progress, but these ideas have yet to reach implementation.

Cuban gar are currently under research for use in broodstocking, both due to the threatened status of gar species and due to the potentially valuable role of gar in reducing the pressure of fisheries on natural aquatic ecosystems. No implementation of Cuban gar broodstocking for ecological protection has yet occurred, however.
