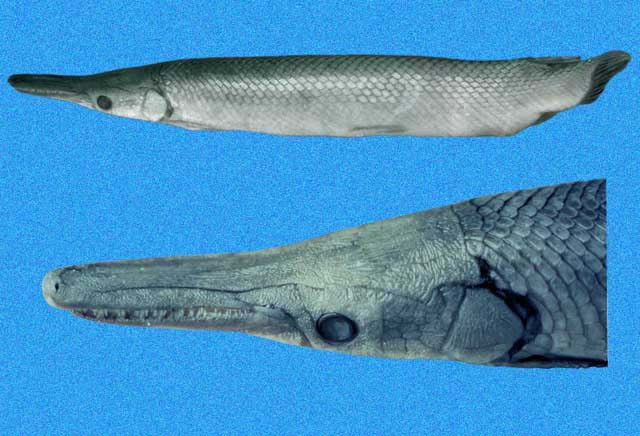

Conservation status
- Least Concern (IUCN 3.1)

Scientific classification
- Kingdom: Animalia
- Phylum: Chordata
- Class: Actinopterygii
- Clade: Ginglymodi
- Order: Lepisosteiformes
- Family: Lepisosteidae
- Genus: Atractosteus
- Species: A. tropicus

Binomial name
- Atractosteus tropicus T. N. Gill, 1863
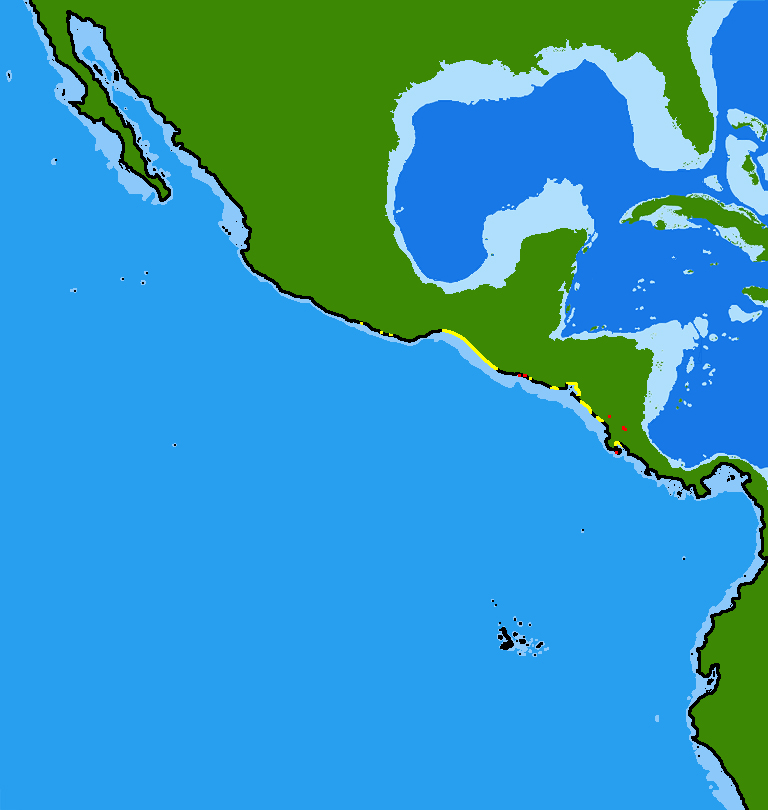
- Pacific coastal range in yellow (main range inland in river basins, as well as Caribbean coastal range, not shown)

Synonyms
- Lepisosteus tristoechus tropicus (Gill 1863); Lepisosteus tropicus (Gill 1863); ?Atractosteus bocourti Duméril 1870

= Tropical gar =

Species of fish

The tropical gar (Atractosteus tropicus) is a large freshwater fish found in Central America. It is located in both Pacific and Atlantic drainage basins, streams, and wetlands. The species holds culinary significance in Tabasco, Mexico, where it is harvested for its tender flesh. The gar uses its signature elongated snout to ambush and capture live prey, usually in the form of small freshwater fish. These features are ancestral in nature, with the species often being considered a "living fossil". Other names for the tropical gar include gaspar in Costa Rica and pejelagarto in Mexico, a combination of "pez" (fish) and "lagarto" (lizard).

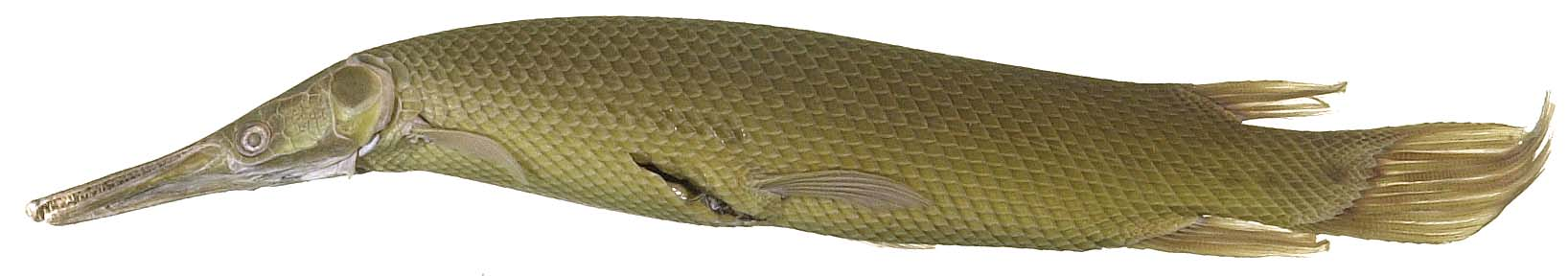
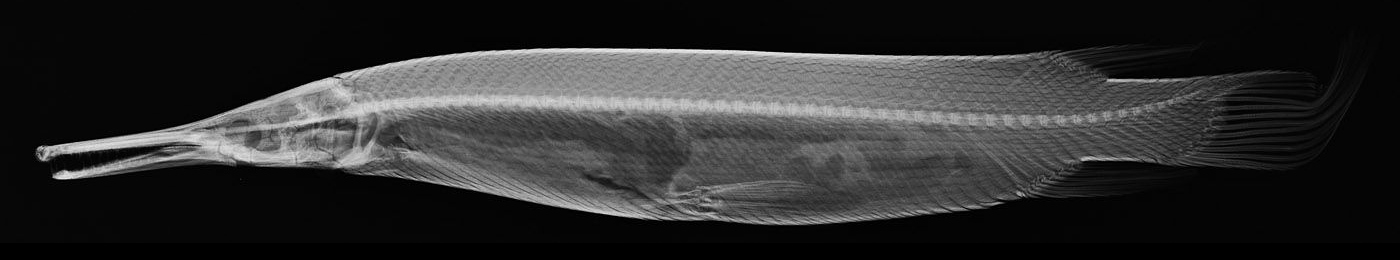
Conventional and X-ray images

== Description ==
The tropical gar can be characterized by its long, torpedo-like body and elongated snout. The tropical gar's body has a grey-green coloration, and can contain dark, asymmetrical patterns. These patterns are more common towards the anterior of the fish, becoming larger and more intense. Like most fish, the tropical gar has a lateral line along its body lined with neuromasts, or clusters of sensory hairs, to determine water current and help with positioning in the water column. The body is covered with thick, diamond-shaped ganoid scales, an ancestral trait which are exclusive to gars and bichirs. These scales are utilized for both protection and help with retaining the position of the fish in a current, due to their added weight. The tropical gar sports pectoral fins right behind its skull and a pair of pelvic fins in its midsection. The dorsal and anal fin of the gar appear close to its rounded caudal fin, at around the same distance on the body.

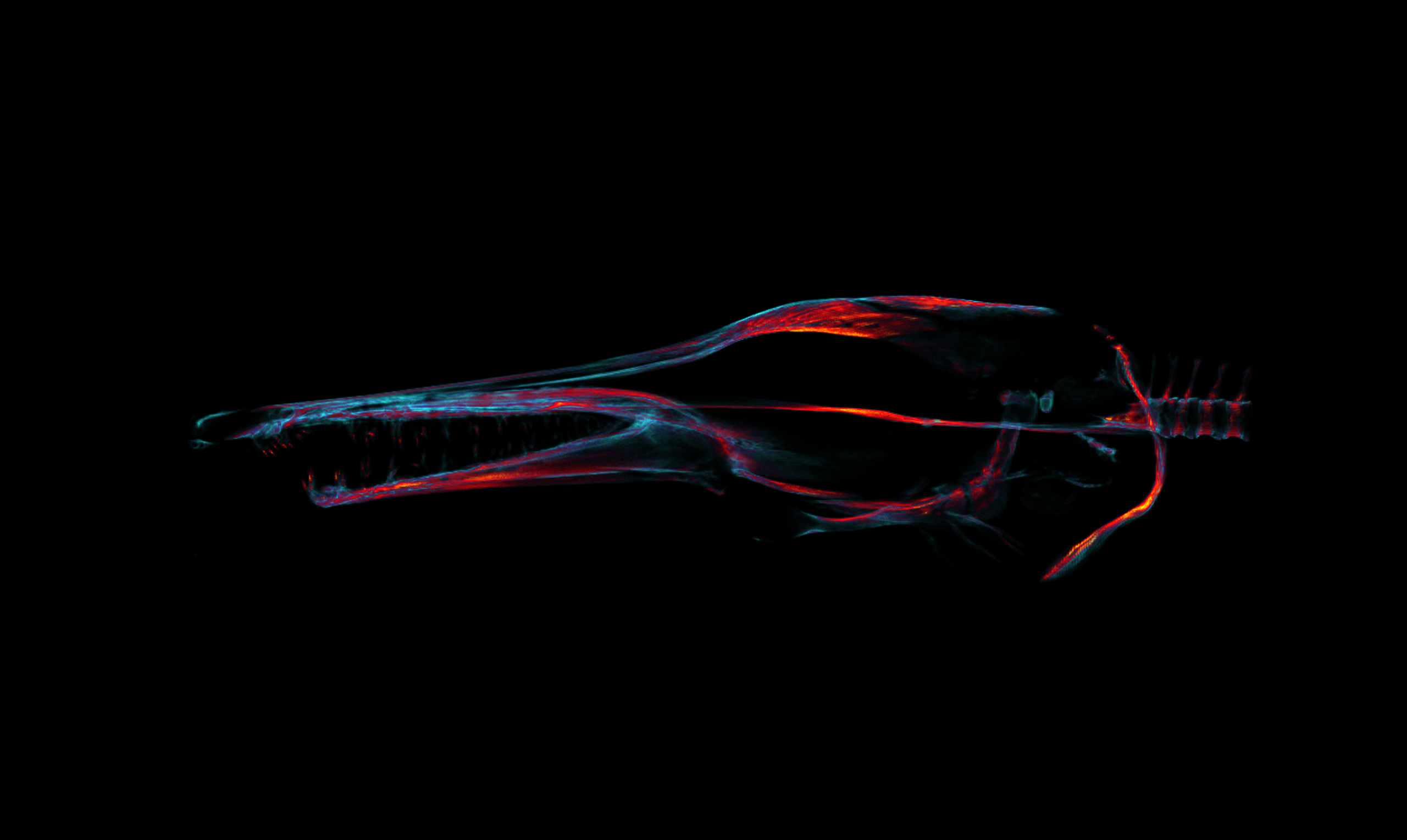
Visualization of bone mineral density of an A. tropicus skull using a microCT scan. Tissue density mapped in color from less dense (cool tones) to more dense (red tones).

The jaw of the tropical gar, similar to other members of the Lepisosteidae, is elongated when compared to other freshwater fish, a modification thought to aid in the capture of live prey. The jaw of the tropical gar uses a primitive lever-like mechanism, and is one of the fastest jaw mechanisms in living fishes. The jaw is lined with sharp, conical teeth, aiding prey capture. These teeth consist of ganoid material, similar to their scales, and have rapid turnover.

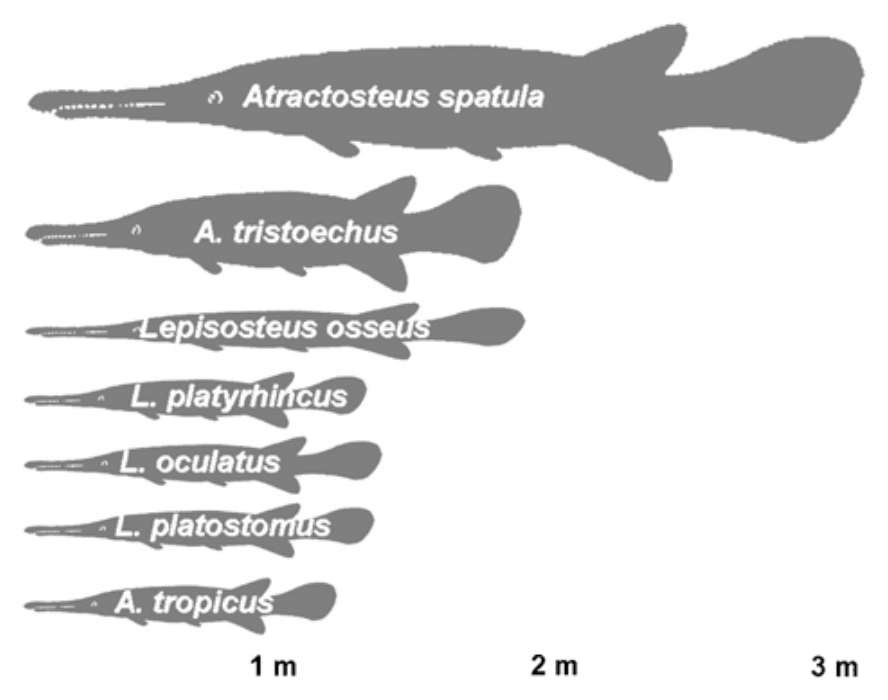
Body size and shape of the 7 living gar species

It is the smallest of the 7 extant gar species, measuring up to 1.25 meters (4 ft) and a maximum weight of 2.9 kg (6.4 lbs)^{12}, although typical individuals are noted to be smaller (<1 m). This species is similar in coloration to the longnose gar, but can be identified from its smaller and broader snout. In addition, the longnose gar's body is more slender and longer than the tropical gar.

== Systematics ==
The tropical gar belongs to the genus Atractosteus, one of the two living genera belonging to the Lepisosteidae family. Their order, Lepisosteiformes, dates back to 110 million years ago, during the early Cretaceous period, and has an extensive fossil record. Tropical gars retain many ancestral features, including their ganoid scales and fulcra, or hardened modified scales, along the edge of their fins. Gars are considered "living fossils", having some of the slowest genome evolution among vertebrates and extremely low rates of speciation. As such, tropical gars, alongside other select gar species, have been used as analogous for ancient teleosts, or modern ray finned fish.

Of the two extant genera of gar, Atractosteus can be characterized by its large width to length ratio (0.22 to 0.34) when compared to Lepisosteus species (0.12 to 0.28)^{1}. Additionally, the gill rakers of Atractosteus are deeply packed together with serrated teeth, when compared with the more conical teeth in Lepisosteus. There are currently three species within Atractosteus, the alligator gar (Atractosteus spatula), the Cuban gar (Atractosteus tristoechus), and the tropical gar.

== Distribution ==
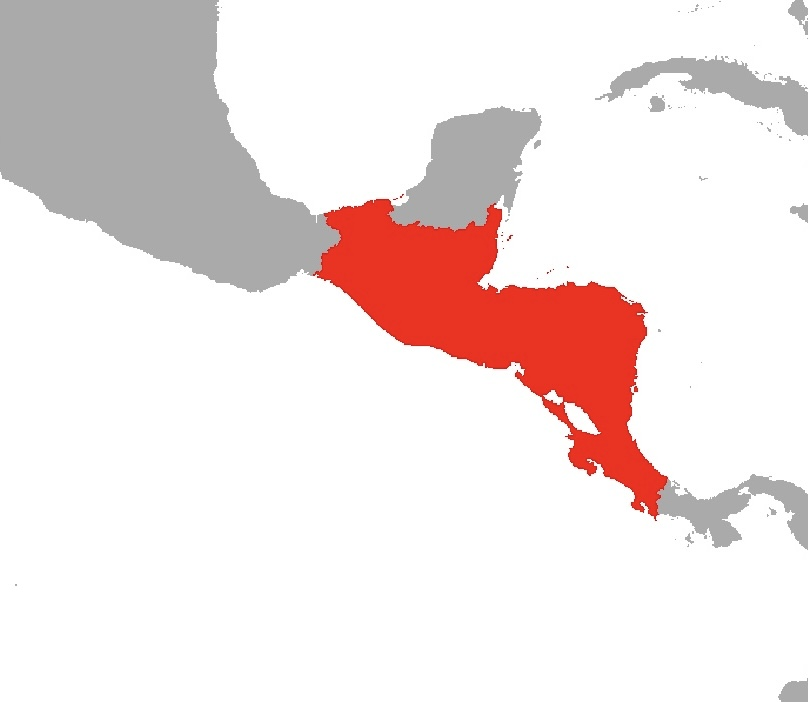
A. tropicus native range, as highlighted in red.

The tropical gar is distributed throughout southern Mexico and Central America. It resides in both Pacific and Atlantic drainage basins. Separate Atlantic basin populations have been found from the Coatzacoalcos River basin to the Usumacinta River basin and from the Nicaragua River basin to Costa Rica. In the Pacific basin, the species can be found from southern Chiapas in Mexico to the Negro river basin in Nicaragua. The species has been found to reside in both rivers, vegetated wetlands, and some individuals have been found in estuaries. The species thrives in water temperatures between 25 °C and 32 °C. As a bimodal species, or one that breathes through both air and water, the tropical gar can remain in deoxygenated environments, cropping up in shallow pools created during wet season in Central America.

== Life history ==
=== Spawning and juvenile life stages ===
A. tropicus typically reach sexual maturation in 2–3 years. The spawn timing of the tropical gar is region dependent. Gar tend to spawn in the midst of the wet season, reportedly spawning in September and October in Mexico and as soon as April in Costa Rica. Tropical gars will make their way out of rivers and into shallow lakes, where they will lay eggs that attach to vegetation and drift wood. Gar eggs are toxic to humans, as well as to many crustaceans and other aquatic species, a defense mechanism against predation. While they can do so during the day, tropical gars are one of the only gar species to spawn at night. Spawning occurs in groups, with one female being surrounded by multiple males. It is unknown how long tropical gar eggs take to incubate, but another Atractosteus species, the alligator gar, has been reported to take 48 hours before larvae start to hatch.

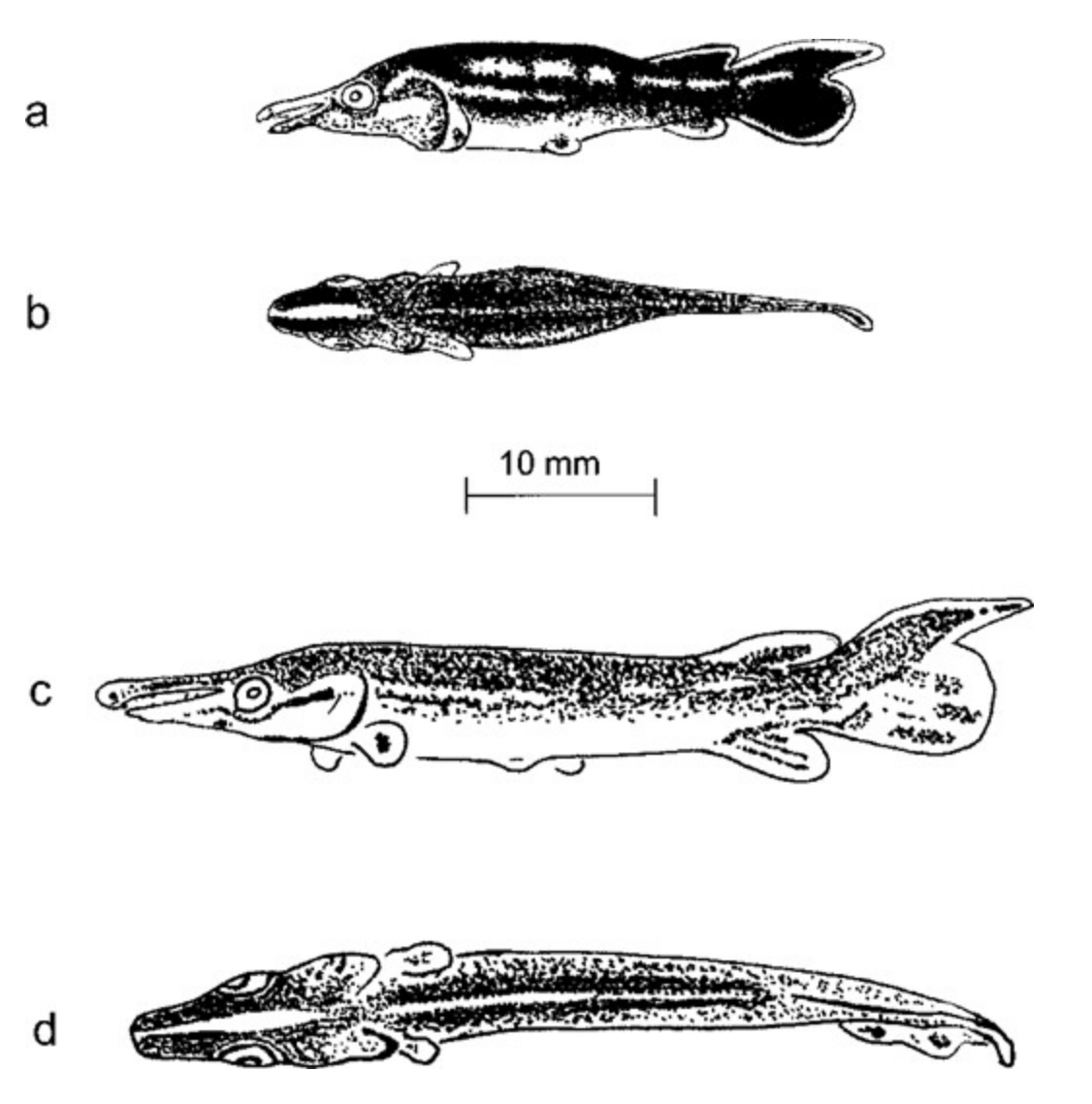
Depiction of various stages of early larval A. tropicus growth

Once hatched, larval gar continue to stay adhered to vegetation, feeding off a yolk sac for a period of time, usually around 4 days. Recently hatched gar retain the torpedo-like body shape of their adult counterparts with small pectoral fins, but the dorsal, caudal, and anal finfolds appear continuous or unseparated. As they grow, tropical gar gain darker pigmentation and pelvic fins start to bud. Once they reach a size of 13 mm, these juveniles begin freely swimming in the water column. After 2 weeks, rays in the dorsal and anal fins begin to form and the snout of the fish begins to elongate. After about a month after hatching, the juvenile resembles its adult counterpart, with fully developed fins and elongated snout. At this stage, the gar feeds primarily on small crustaceans, such as copepods. The species is also known to be cannibalistic, with juveniles often feeding on one another. Vegetation and other refuge has been found to reduce the number of cannibalistic attacks dramatically.

=== Diet ===
As adults, tropical gar are top predators in Central America freshwater environments, feeding on crustaceans, fish, and amphibians. Reports of stomach content show that they primarily prey upon cichlids, with additional reports of fruits and other plant matter in their digestive tracts, but it is unknown whether this plays a role in their diet or simply a byproduct of their feeding habits. Gars are lie-in-wait predators, stalking prey before striking. After capturing a prey item, the gar will move laterally in order to position the prey into its buccal cavity, or mouth. The gar will attempt to consume fish face-first, as observations have shown tail-first feeding to have a higher rate of failure. While some species of gar, such as the shortnose gar (Lepisosteus platostomus) have been shown to exhibit territorial behavior, this has not been seen in tropical gar.

=== Sex determination ===
Atractosteus tropicus lack differentiated sex chromosomes. The sex of an individual is decided by their expression of various autosomal genes, which play a role in altering brain, liver, and gonad functions. As a result of this system, there is little to no sexual dimorphism amongst the species, and sexing individuals is rather difficult. There is some evidence to suggest that females amongst the species are, on average, slightly longer and rounder than their male counterparts.

=== Facultative air breathing ===
Tropical gar are bimodal breathers, meaning that they use both their gills for water breathing and vascularized swim bladder for breathing air. This swim bladder is analogous to a lung, able to take in oxygen from above the waterline. This allows the tropical gar to have moderate success in deoxygenated pools of water, significant for their often fluctuating environment. When breathing, the tropical gar will tilt their body slightly upward and breathe in a 4-step process. Air is pushed out of the "lung" into the buccal cavity, where it is then expelled through its opercular slits, part of the gills. New air is then dragged into the buccal cavity and forced back into the "lungs".

== Conservation status and cultural imporantance ==
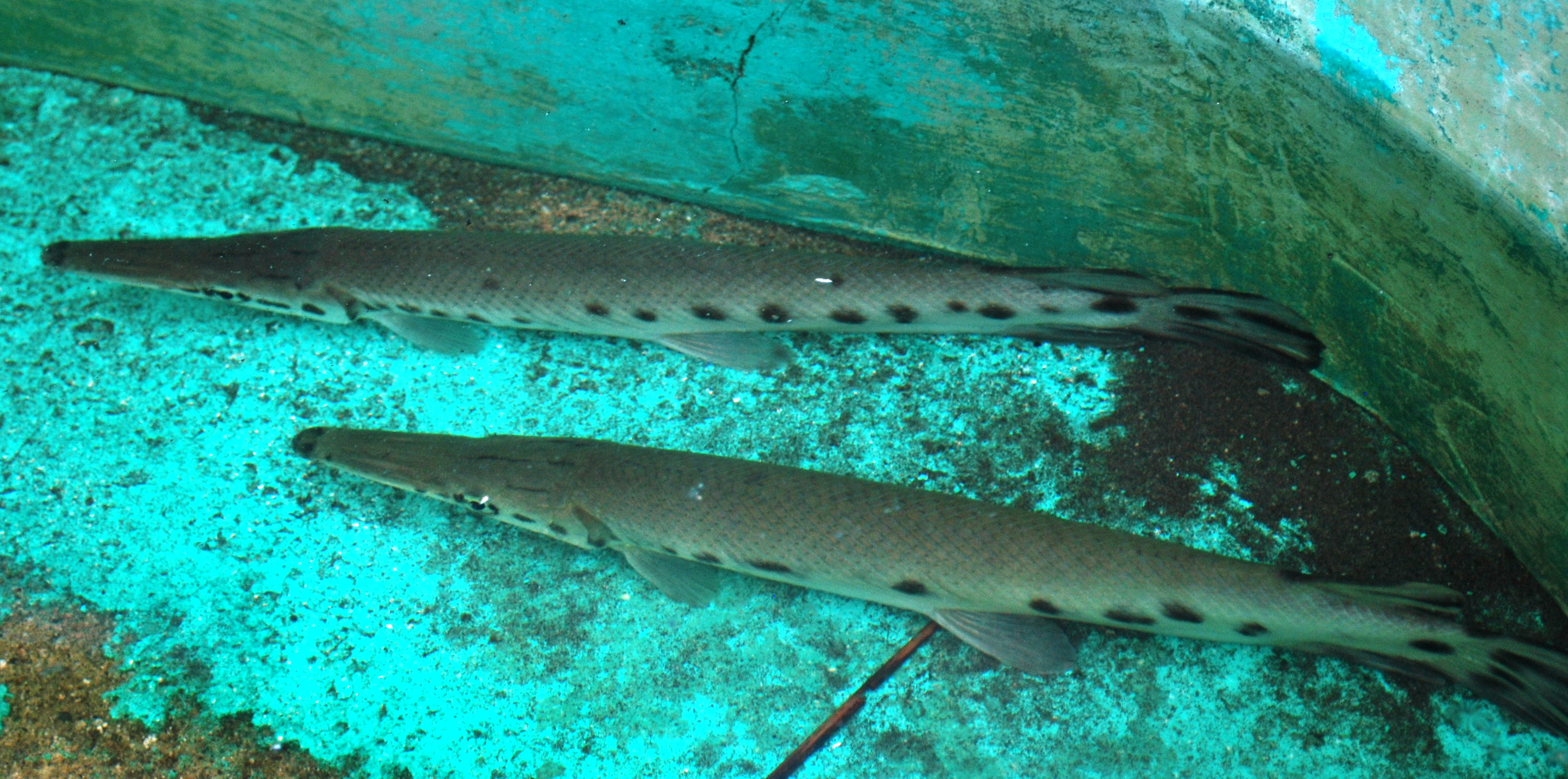
"Pejelagarto" or lizard fish, as seen in Puerto Arista, Chipias

The tropical gar population is currently considered of least concern according to the IUCN. It is the most abundant gar species within its native range. The wild population of gar is currently in decline due to land use changes and exploitation in Mexico and Central America. In specific, the creation of dams and agricultural expansion have led to a decline of larval recruitment during spawning season.

While gar are not widely eaten, there is a traditional Tabasco dish of the same name that uses chili, limes, and salt to cook the animal. The fish is a staple food in Tabasco, Mexico, being one of five main fishes being harvested in that region. Genetic variation among gar populations is low, potentially due to their exploitation. Broodstocks of the tropical gar have been established within the region, such as at the University Juárez Autónoma de Tabasco located Villahermosa, Mexico. The National University of Costa Rica has worked on inducing wild populations of gar to spawn. While the tropical gar has the fastest maturing time of all gar species, results of captive spawning have been mixed.

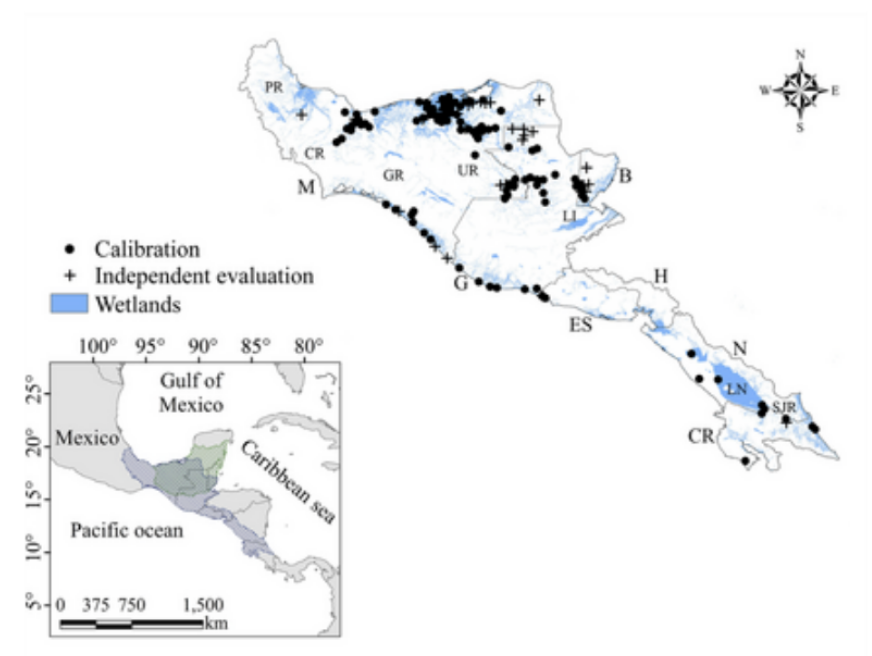
Sample sites of A. tropicus with respect to wetlands

Despite potential overfishing concerns, ecological niche models, which show future suitable habitat for the species, have predicted that the habitable area for the fish will increase with climate change and warmer freshwater temperatures. In addition, rising sea levels will increase the area of wetlands in Central America, in which the gar spawn and hunt in. As a top predator, this could have trophic effects on smaller fish populations in Central America. In addition, the development of aquaculture infrastructure for the gar could disrupt local ecosystems. Several groups have advocated for sustainable practices regarding the cultivation of gar to ensure that harvesting of this fish minimizes environmental impact.
