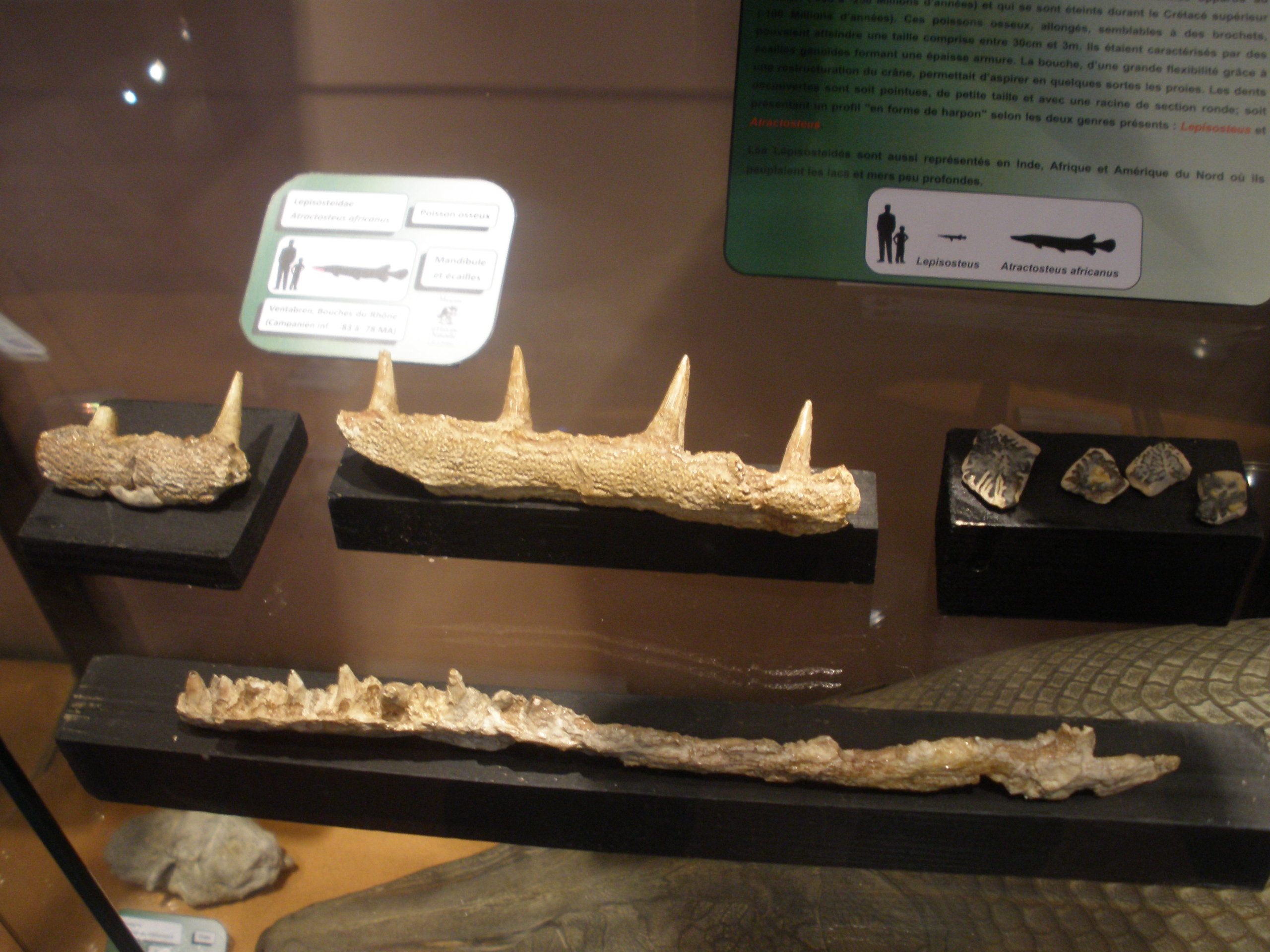
- Fossil jaw of Atractosteus africanus

Scientific classification
- Domain: Eukaryota
- Kingdom: Animalia
- Phylum: Chordata
- Class: Actinopterygii
- Clade: Ginglymodi
- Order: Lepisosteiformes
- Family: Lepisosteidae
- Genus: Atractosteus
- Species: A. africanus

Binomial name
- Atractosteus africanus Arambourg & Joleaud, 1943

= Atractosteus africanus =

Atractosteus africanus Temporal range: ~Campanian

Extinct species of fish

Atractosteus africanus is a potentially dubious species of gar from the Late Cretaceous of Niger and France.
