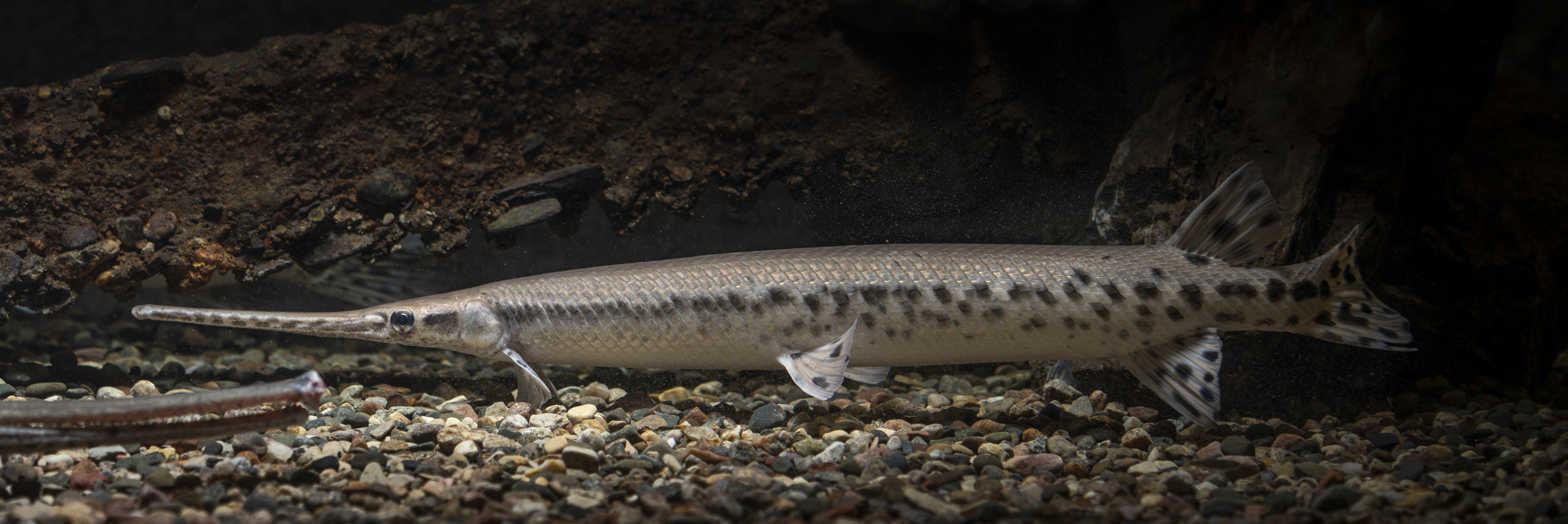
- At the Gavins Point National Fish Hatchery

Conservation status
- Least Concern (IUCN 3.1)

Scientific classification
- Kingdom: Animalia
- Phylum: Chordata
- Class: Actinopterygii
- Clade: Ginglymodi
- Order: Lepisosteiformes
- Family: Lepisosteidae
- Genus: Lepisosteus
- Species: L. osseus

Binomial name
- Lepisosteus osseus (Linnaeus, 1758)

Synonyms
- list: Esox osseus Linnaeus, 1758; Psalidostomus osseus Linnaeus 1758; Psalisostomus osseus Linnaeus 1758; Acus maxima Catesby 1771; Acus squamosa Catesby 1771; Acus viridis Catesby 1771; Esox viridis Bonnaterre 1788 ex Gmelin 1789; Lepisosteus gavial Lacepède 1803; Esox niloticus Perry 1811; Lepisosteus stenorhynchus Rafinesque 1818; Sarchirus vittatus Rafinesque 1818; Sarchirus argenteus Rafinesque 1820; Lepisosteus longirostris Rafinesque 1820; Lepisosteus oxyurus Rafinesque 1820; Lepisosteus gracilis Richardson 1836; Lepisosteus huronensis Richardson 1836; Lepidosteus rostratus Cuvier 1836; Lepidosteus bison DeKay 1842; Lepisosteus lineatus Thompson 1842; Macrognathus loricatus Gronow 1854; Lepidosteus leptorhynchus Girard 1858; Lepidosteus crassus Cope 1865; Lepidosteus otarius Cope 1865; Lepidosteus ayresii Duméril 1870; Lepidosteus clintonii Duméril 1870; Lepidosteus copei Duméril 1870; Lepidosteus elisabeth Duméril 1870; Lepidosteus lesueurii Duméril 1870; Lepidosteus harlani Duméril 1870; Lepidosteus horatii Duméril 1870; Lepidosteus lamarii Duméril 1870; Lepidosteus louisianensis Duméril 1870; Lepidosteus milberti Duméril 1870; Lepidosteus piquotianus Duméril 1870; Lepidosteus smithii Duméril 1870; Lepidosteus thompsonii Duméril 1870; Lepisosteus treculii Duméril 1870; Lepidosteus troostii Duméril 1870

= Longnose gar =

Species of fish

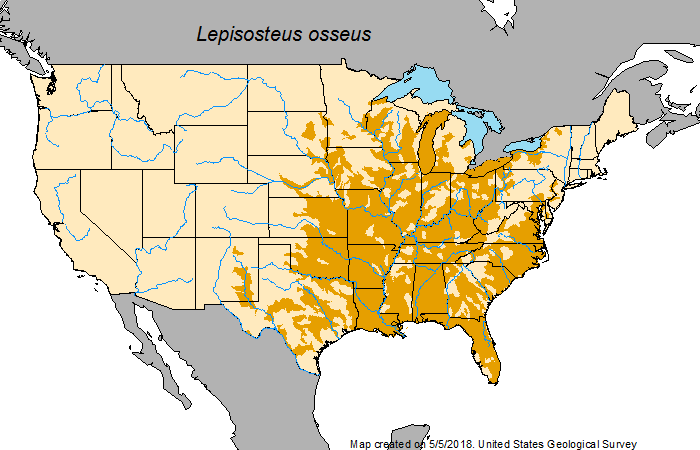
US distribution of longnose gar

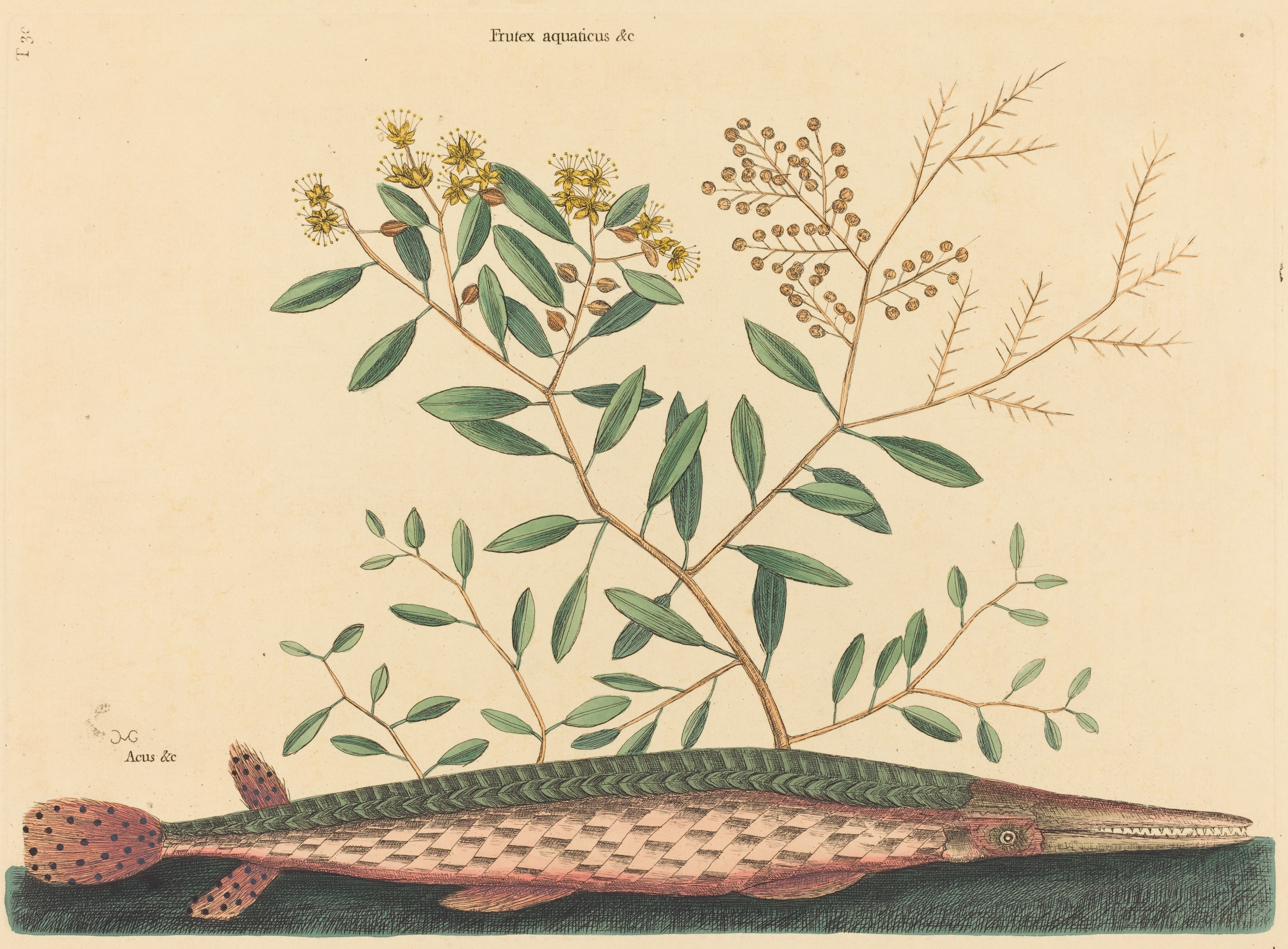
Mark Catesby, The Green Gar Fish (Esox osseus), published 1731–1743. An eighteenth-century print with Linnaeus' original name for the longnose gar.

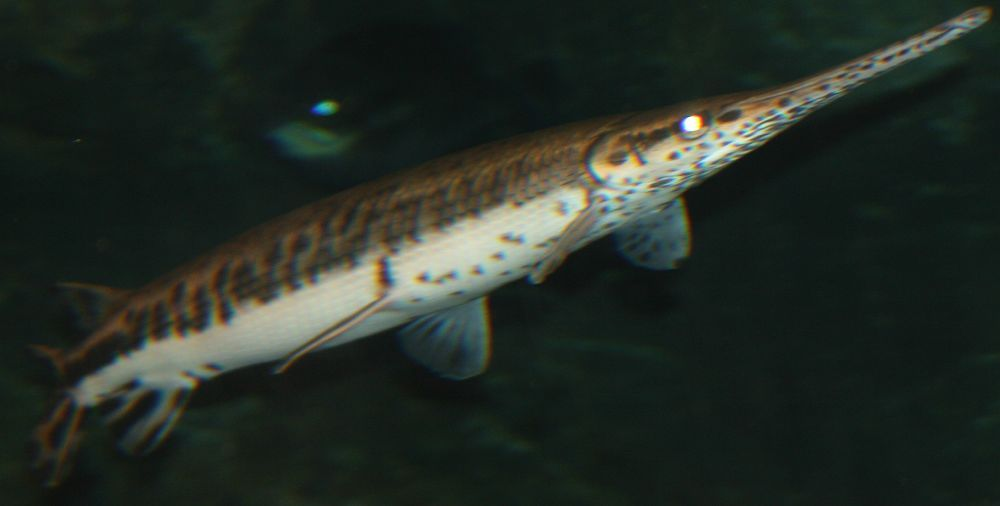
Longnose gar (L. osseus)

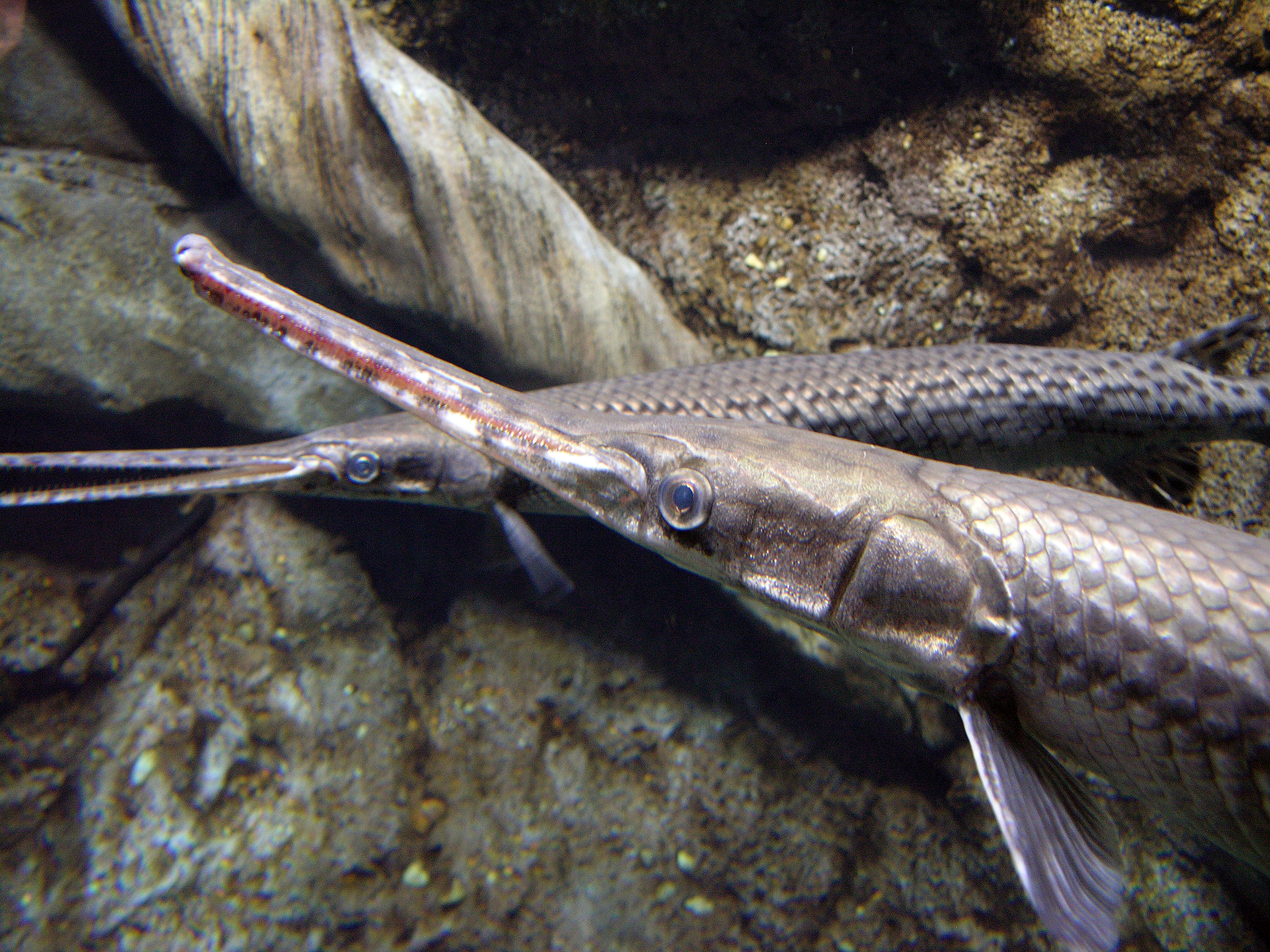
At Georgia Aquarium

The longnose gar (Lepisosteus osseus), also known as longnose garpike or billy gar, is a ray-finned fish in the family Lepisosteidae. The genus may have been present in North America for about 100 million years. References are made to gars being a primitive group of bony fish because they have retained some primitive features, such as a spiral valve intestine, but they are not primitive in the sense of not being fully developed.

They have an olive brown to green, torpedo-shaped body armored with ganoid scales, elongated jaws that form a needle-like snout nearly three times the length of its head, and a row of numerous sharp, cone-shaped teeth on each side of the upper jaw. They typically inhabit freshwater lakes, brackish water near coastal areas, swamps, and sluggish backwaters of rivers and streams. They can breathe both air and water, which allows them to inhabit aquatic environments that are low in oxygen.

Longnose gar are found along the east coasts of North and Central America, and range as far west in the US as Kansas, Texas, and southern New Mexico. They are the only species of the family Lepisosteidae found in New Mexico. Their populations are stable and in some areas abundant in the interior portions of their range.

== Etymology ==
The longnose gar was first described by Carl Linnaeus (1758), who gave it the name Esox osseus. The generic name Esox, which is for pike, was later changed to Lepisosteus, the genus for slender gars. Lepisosteus osseus (Linnaeus, 1758), the scientific name for longnose gar, originated by combining lepis, which is Greek for scale, and osteos, the Latin word for bony. The latter references the bone-like, rhomboidal-shaped ganoid scales that protect gars against predation.

Gars have been referred to as primitive fish or living fossils because they have retained some morphological characteristics of their earliest ancestors, such as a spiral valve intestine, and a highly vascularized swim bladder lung that supplements gill respiration for breathing both air and water. Referring to gars as primitive fish simply means they have existed for a long time, having evolved over millions of years into a more perfected morphological state, not that the animal is primitive in the sense that it is not fully developed.

== Distribution ==
Fossils of the genus dating from 100 million years ago (Mya) have been found in Africa, Asia, Europe, North America, and South America. In the US, fossils of the modern species date back to the Pleistocene, where they were discovered in the Kingsdown Formation in Meade County, Kansas, and date back to the Irvingtonian (1.8–0.3 Mya). Longnose gar are found in Central America, Cuba, North America, and the Isla de la Juventud.

Longnose gar are frequently found in fresh water in the eastern half of the US, but some gar were found in salinities up to 31 ppt. Their microhabitats consist of areas near downed trees, stone outcrops, and vegetation.

== Ecology ==
The most common prey of longnose gar are small fish and occasionally insects, molluscs, and small crustaceans; they mostly feed at night. In most studies of adult L. osseus, a variety of species made up a majority of the diet, with the dominant prey changing among locations. Inland silversides were particularly common prey of juvenile gar in Lake Texoma, making up 84% of the diet, with gamefishes accounting for less than 1% of the diet. In Florida, their diet consisted mainly of fishes, with gizzard shad, bullhead catfish, and small bluegill particularly common. In Missouri, fishes made up 98% of the diet with shiners being the most common prey. In some lakes, adult longnose gar may consume large numbers of sunfish. Menhaden are a major food source along coasts where L. osseus moves towards the mouths of bayous into higher-salinity waters in the afternoon and evening to find this more prevalent prey. Longnose gar then move back up the bayous, into the lower-salinity waters in the morning. Their main competitors are other garfishes, and somewhat commonly, large gar to feed on smaller ones. Historically, Native Americans and early colonists harvested longnose gar as a main food source. Over time, longnose gars have gained in popularity as a sportfish rather than as a food source, but some people consider gar meat a delicacy. Adult longnose gar are considered apex predators in their aquatic habit, and have few predators, which include humans and in the southern reaches of their range the American alligator. They are most vulnerable to predation when they are young, and are preyed upon by other garfishes, larger fishes, birds of prey, snapping turtles, and water snakes.

== Life history ==
Longnose gar have a typical lifespan of 15–20 years with a maximum reported age of 39. This long lifespan allows the female to sexually mature around 6 years old. Males mature sexually as early as 2 years of age. Longnose gar are sexually dimorphic; the females are larger than the males in body length, weight, and fin length. They generally have a clutch size close to 30,000, depending on the weight-to-length ratio of the females; larger females bear larger clutch sizes. They spawn in temperatures close to 20 °C (68 °F) in late April to early July. Eggs have a toxic, adhesive coating to help them stick to substrates, and they are deposited onto stones in shallow water, rocky shelves, vegetation, or smallmouth bass nests. Their hatch time is 7–9 days; young gar stay in vegetation during the first summer of life. Longnose gar reach a typical length of 28–48 inches (71–122 cm), with a maximum length around 6 feet (1.8 m) and 55 lb (25 kg) in weight.

== Management ==
Currently, no management of this species is being conducted, nor is it federally listed as endangered, although some states have reported it as threatened (South Dakota, Delaware, and Pennsylvania). In the early 1900s, longnose gar were considered as destructive predators. Soon after this characterization, gar population reduction methods were established. Their declining populations are due to overfishing, habitat loss, dams, road construction, pollution, and other human-caused destruction of the aquatic systems. Because of their long lifespans and older sexual maturity age, factors affecting their reproduction are an issue in preserving them. Overfishing is a large issue for this fish, especially when the fish have not reached sexual maturity due to the female not reaching sexual maturity until about 6 years of age.
