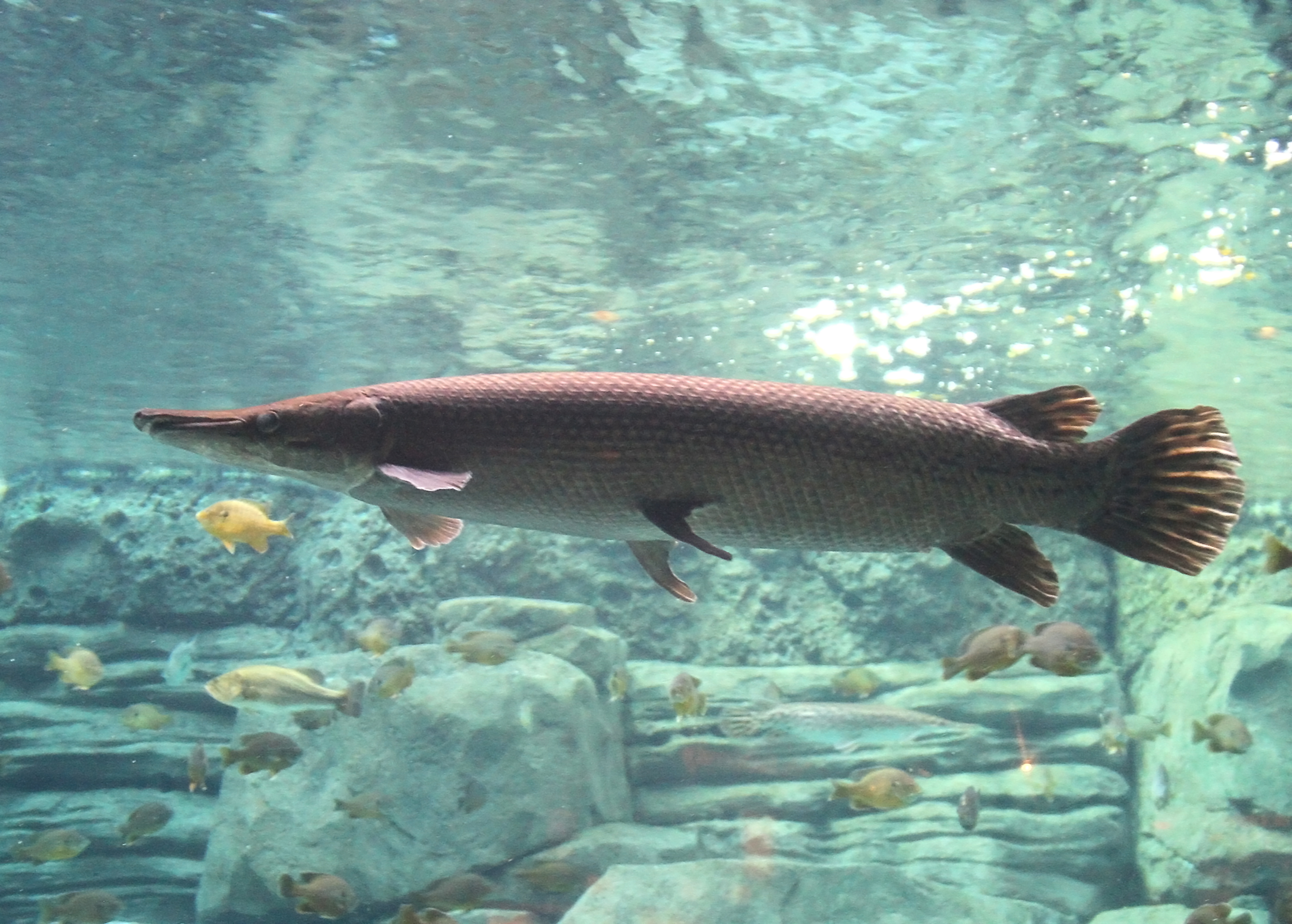
- Alligator gar at Cincinnati Zoo and Botanical Garden

Conservation status
- Least Concern (IUCN 3.1)

Scientific classification
- Kingdom: Animalia
- Phylum: Chordata
- Class: Actinopterygii
- Clade: Ginglymodi
- Order: Lepisosteiformes
- Family: Lepisosteidae
- Genus: Atractosteus
- Species: A. spatula

Binomial name
- Atractosteus spatula (Lacépède, 1803)
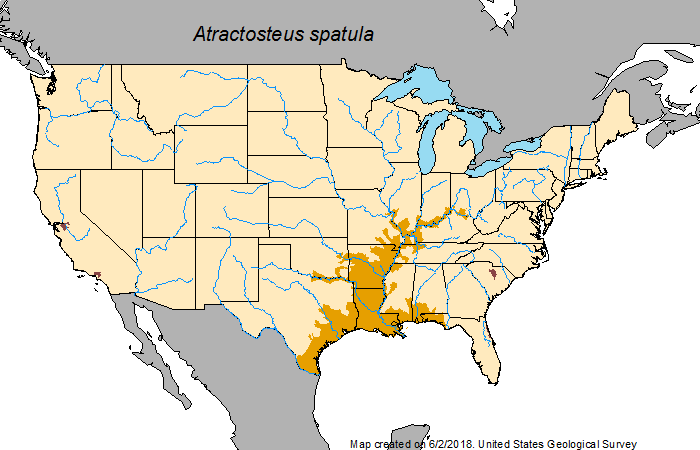

Synonyms
- Species: Lepisosteus spatula Lacépède 1803; Esox cepedianus Shaw 1804; Litholepis adamantinus Rafinesque 1818; Atractosteus adamantinus (Rafinesque 1818); Lepisosteus ferox Rafinesque 1820; Atractosteus ferox (Rafinesque 1820); Lepidosteus chasei Wailes 1854; Lepisosteus berlandieri Girard 1858; Atractosteus lucius Duméril 1870

= Alligator gar =

Alligator gar Temporal range: Aquitanian – recent

Species of ray-finned fish

The alligator gar (Atractosteus spatula) is a euryhaline ray-finned fish in the clade Ginglymodi of the infraclass Holostei /hoʊˈlɒstiaɪ/, being most closely related to the bowfins. It is the largest species in the gar family (Lepisosteidae), and is among the largest freshwater fishes in North America. The fossil record traces its group's existence back to the Early Cretaceous over 100 million years ago. Gars are often referred to as "primitive fishes" or "living fossils", because they have retained some morphological characteristics of their early ancestors, such as a spiral valve intestine, which is also common to the digestive system of sharks, and the ability to breathe in both air and water. Their common name was derived from their resemblance to the American alligator, particularly their broad snouts and long, sharp teeth. It is suggested that an alligator gar can grow up to 10 ft (3.0 m) in length.

The body of an alligator gar is torpedo-shaped, usually brown or olive colored, fading to a lighter gray or yellow ventral surface. In very rare occurrences, they can also be black, seen in gars that have a high level of melanin. Their scales are not like the scales of other fishes; rather, they are ganoid scales, which are bone-like, rhomboidal-shaped scales, often with serrated edges, and covered by an enamel-like substance. Ganoid scales are nearly impenetrable, and are excellent protection against predation. Unlike other gar species, the upper jaw of an alligator gar has a dual row of large, sharp teeth that are used to impale and hold prey. Alligator gar are stalking, ambush predators, primarily piscivores, but they also ambush and eat waterfowl and small mammals they find floating on the water's surface.

Populations of alligator gar have been extirpated from much of their historic range as a result of habitat destruction, indiscriminate culling, and unrestricted harvests. Populations are now located primarily in the southern portions of the United States extending into Mexico. They are considered euryhaline because they can adapt to varying salinities, ranging from freshwater lakes and swamps to brackish marshes, estuaries, and bays along the Gulf of Mexico.

For nearly a half century, alligator gar were considered "trash fish", or a "nuisance species" detrimental to sport fisheries, and were targeted for elimination by state and federal authorities in the United States. The 1980s brought a better understanding of the ecological balance necessary to sustain an ecosystem, and an awareness that the alligator gar is an important element of the ecosystems they inhabit was eventually understood. Over time, alligator gar were afforded some protection by state and federal resource agencies. They are also protected under the Lacey Act, which makes transporting certain species of fish in interstate commerce illegal when in violation of state law or regulation. Several state and federal resource agencies are monitoring populations in the wild, and have initiated outreach programs to educate the public. Alligator gar are being cultured in ponds, pools, raceways, and tanks by federal hatcheries for mitigation stocking, by universities for research purposes, and in Mexico for consumption.

== Anatomy ==
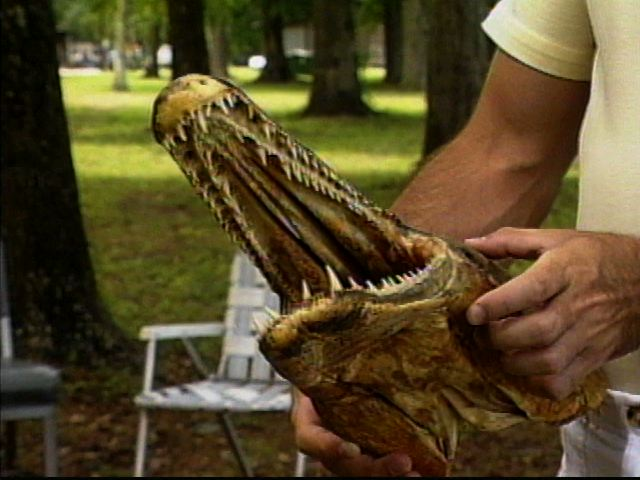
Preserved display of an alligator gar head

Alligator gar maneuvering with pectoral fins in large zoo aquarium

Alligator gar are the largest species in the gar family, and among the largest freshwater fishes found in North America. Mature alligator gar commonly measure 6 ft (1.8 m) in length, and weigh over 100 lb (45 kg). However, anecdotal reports suggest they can grow up to 10 ft (3 m) in length, and weigh as much as 350 lb (159 kg). The largest alligator gar officially recorded was inadvertently caught in the net of fisherman Kenny Williams of Vicksburg, Mississippi, while he was fishing the oxbow lakes of the Mississippi River on February 14, 2011. Williams was pulling up his net on Lake Chotard, expecting to find buffalo fish, but instead discovered a large alligator gar tangled in his net. The gar was 8 ft 5 1/4 in (2.572 m) long, weighed 327 lb (148 kg), and its girth was 47 in (120 cm). According to wildlife officials, the fish was estimated to be between 50 and 70 years old; one report estimated the gar's age to be at least 95. Williams donated it to the Mississippi Museum of Natural Science in Jackson, where it will remain on display.

All gars have torpedo-shaped bodies, but some distinguishing characteristics of adult alligator gar include their large size; heavy bodies; broad heads; short, broad snouts; large, sharp teeth; and a double row of teeth on their upper jaws. They are usually brown or olive colored, fading to a lighter gray or yellow ventral surface. The dorsal and anal fins are positioned toward the back of their bodies, and their caudal fins are abbreviate heterocercal, or nonsymmetrical.

== Physiology ==
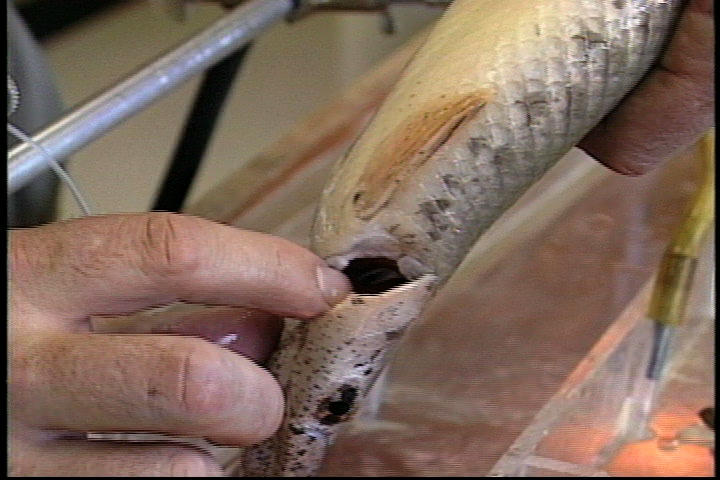
Gill of a juvenile gar

Alligator gar have gills, but unlike many species of fish, they also have a highly vascularized swim bladder that can act as a lung, supplementing gill respiration. The bladder not only provides buoyancy, but also enables them to breathe in air. This capability allows alligator gar to inhabit stagnant and/or insufficiently aerated bodies of water that are poorly oxygenated or hypoxic, in which most other fishes would die of suffocation due to a lack of dissolved oxygen within the water. The swim bladder is connected to their fore gut by a small pneumatic duct, which allows them to breathe or gulp air when they break the water's surface, an action seen quite frequently on lakes in the Southern United States during the hot summer.

The scales of alligator gar are not like the scales of other fishes, which have flexible elasmoid scales; gar bodies are protected by inflexible and articulated ganoid scales that are rhomboidal-shaped, often with serrated edges, and composed of a tough inner layer of bone and hard outer layer of ganoin, which is essentially homologous to tooth enamel, making them nearly impenetrable.

== Taxonomy and evolution ==
Lacépède first described the alligator gar in 1803. The original name was Lepisosteus spatula, but was later changed by E.O. Wiley in 1976 to Atractosteus spatula to recognize two distinct taxa of gars. Synonyms of Atractosteus spatula include: Lesisosteus [sic] ferox (Rafinesque 1820), and Lepisosteus spatula (Lacepede 1803). Fossils from the order Lepisosteiformes have been collected in Europe from the Cretaceous to Oligocene periods; in Africa and India from the Cretaceous; and in North America from the Cretaceous to recent times. The Lepisosteidae are the only extant family of gars with seven species, all located in North and Central America. The fossil record traces the existence of gars such as the Alligator gar back over 100 million years ago to the Early Cretaceous period. Despite being a highly evolved species, alligator gar are often referred to as "primitive fishes" or "living fossils", because they have retained a few morphological characteristics of their earliest ancestors, with seemingly few to no apparent changes, such as: a spiral valve intestine, which is also common to the digestive system of sharks; an abbreviate heterocercal tail; and a swim bladder lung for breathing in both air and water.

== Feeding behavior ==
Alligator gar are stalking, ambush predators.

Alligator gar are relatively passive, seemingly sluggish solitary fish, but voracious ambush predators. They are opportunistic night predators and are primarily piscivores, but gar will also ambush and eat water fowl, other birds, turtles, and small mammals that may be floating on the surface. Their method of ambush is to float a few feet below the surface, and wait for unsuspecting prey to swim within reach. The gar will then lunge forward, and with a sweeping motion, grab their prey, impaling it on their double rows of sharp teeth.

Diet studies have shown alligator gar to be opportunistic piscivores, and even scavengers depending on the availability of their preferred food source. They occasionally ingest sport fish, but the majority of stomach content studies suggest they feed predominately on forage fishes, such as gizzard shad, as well as invertebrates (e.g., crustaceans) and water fowl. However, brackish water populations of alligator gar are known to feed heavily on blue crabs, in addition to fish such as the hardhead catfish (Ariopsis felis). Diet studies have also revealed fishing tackle and boat-engine parts in their stomachs.

== Spawning ==
As with most ancestral species, alligator gar are long-lived, and sexually late maturing. Most females do not reach sexual maturity until after their first decade of life, while males reach sexual maturity in half that time. The conditions must be precise for a successful spawning to occur. Preparation for spawning begins in the spring with the extended photoperiod and rising water temperatures, but flooding is also necessary to trigger the event. When rivers rise and spread over the floodplain, they create oxbow lakes and sloughs, and inundate terrestrial vegetation, which in turn provides protection and a nutrient-rich habitat for larval fish and fry. Once the water temperature has reached 68 to 82 °F (20 to 28 °C), and all the other criteria are met, gar move into the grassy, weed-laden shallows to spawn.

Actual spawning occurs when males gather around gravid females, and begin writhing, twisting, bumping into, and slithering over the tops of females, an activity which triggers the release of eggs. Males release clouds of milt to fertilize the eggs as they are released into the water column. The sticky eggs then attach to submerged vegetation, and development begins. Only a few days are needed for the eggs to hatch into larval fish, and another 10 days or so for the larval fish to detach from the vegetation, and start moving about as young fry. Egg production is variable, and believed to be dependent on the size of the female. A common formula used for predicting the number of eggs a female can produce is 4.1 eggs/gram of body weight, which gives an average of about 150,000 eggs per spawn. The eggs of alligator gar are bright red and poisonous to humans if ingested.

== Distribution ==
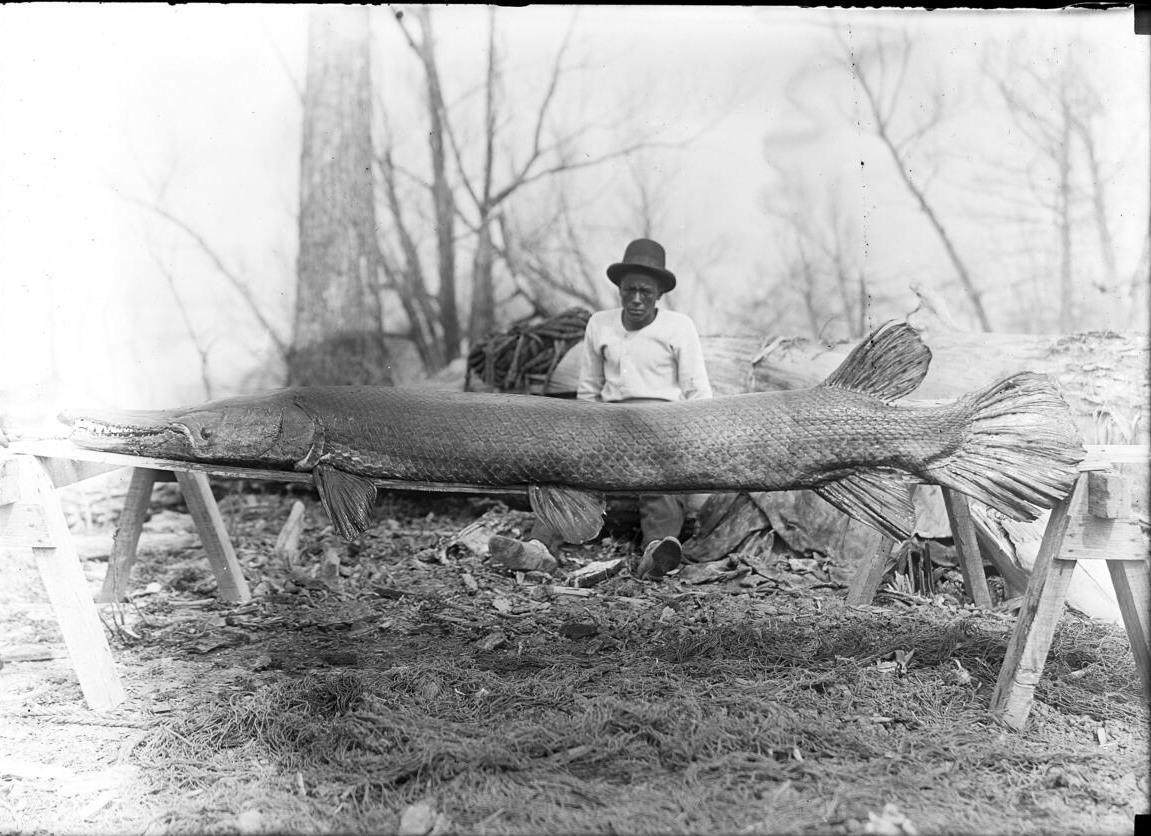
Alligator gar caught in Moon Lake, Mississippi, March 1910

=== Natural range ===
Alligator gar inhabit a wide variety of aquatic habitats, but most are found in the Southern United States in reservoirs and lakes, in the backwaters of lowland rivers, and in the brackish waters of estuaries, bayous, and bays. Gars occur southward along the Gulf Coast of Texas, into Tamaulipas and northern Veracruz, Mexico; however, records from Nicaragua and Costa Rica are considered "suspect and refuted". They have occasionally been seen in the Gulf of Mexico. In Texas and Louisiana, large gars are commonly seen breaking the surface in reservoirs, bayous, and brackish marshes. They are found throughout the lower Mississippi River Valley and Gulf Coast states of the Southern United States and Mexico as far south as Veracruz, and encompassing the following states in the US: Texas, Oklahoma, Louisiana, Kentucky, Mississippi, Alabama, Tennessee, Arkansas, Missouri, Illinois, and Florida. Reports suggest alligator gar were once numerous throughout much of their northern range, but valid sightings today are rare, and may occur once every few years. Records of historical distribution indicate alligator gar once inhabited regions as far north as central Kansas, Nebraska, Ohio, Iowa, and west-central Illinois, where they are now listed as extirpated. The most northerly verified catch was in Meredosia, Illinois, in 1922. In 2016, there were efforts to reintroduce alligator gar between Tennessee and Illinois, as part of an effort to control invasive Asian carp.

=== Outside natural range ===
Alligator gar is an invasive species in Mainland China, where it can be purchased as an exotic pet fish. Due to its large size and armored scales, it has few natural predators even within its natural range, and its poisonous eggs may pose a passive threat to other fish. The fish has been sighted in eight provinces, and authorities have worked to remove it.

In November 2008, a broadhead gar, genus Atractosteus, measuring 5.2 to 6.4 ft (1.6 to 2.0 m) was caught in the Caspian Sea north of Esenguly, Turkmenistan, by two officials of Turkmenistan Fishery Protection.

On September 4, 2009, a 3 ft 3 in (0.99 m) alligator gar was found in Tak Wah Park in Tsuen Wan, Hong Kong. Over the next two days, at least 16 other alligator gar, the largest measuring 4.9 ft (1.5 m), were found in ponds within public parks in Hong Kong. Nearby residents reported the alligator gar had been released into the ponds by aquarium hobbyists, and had lived there for several years. However, after a complaint made by a citizen who falsely identified alligator gar as crocodiles, the use of terms like "horrible man-eating fish" had begun appearing in the headlines of some major local newspapers. Officials with Leisure and Cultural Services in Tak Wah Park removed all the alligator gar from the ponds because they were concerned the large, carnivorous fish might harm children. Not unusually, the large, sharp teeth and outward appearance of alligator gar can precipitate unreasonable fear in those unfamiliar with the species. Sensationalized reports have contributed to the misconception of predatory attacks by alligator gar on humans, though none of the reports have been confirmed.

On January 21, 2011, an alligator gar measuring 4 ft 11 in (1.50 m) was caught in a canal in Pasir Ris, Singapore, by two recreational fishermen. The fish was taken to a nearby pond, where the owner confirmed it was an alligator gar rather than an arapaima, as the men had initially thought.

Anecdotal reports have been made of alligator gar captured in various parts of India, but are believed to be the result of incidental releases by aquarium hobbyists and the like. In August 2015, an alligator gar was found entangled in cloth inside a well in Dadar, where it had been living for quite some time. It was rescued by animal activists and returned to the well unharmed. In June 2016, a 3.5-ft alligator gar was caught from Subhash Sarovar Lake in Kolkata. Other incidents over the years have been random, ranging from captures in coastal waters during environmental assessments to captures in private ponds.

On June 27, 2020, an alligator gar measuring 112 cm (3 ft 8in) was reported dead on the shore of Gonyeli Baraji reservoir, North Cyprus. Specialists from Cyprus Wildlife Research Institute collected the fish, and explained its species to be alligator gar (Atractosteus spatula). It is suspected that the fish had been released recently, and could not cope with the environment and died; however, it could be that the fish was resident there for years. A necropsy will be applied to find out more.

Similarly, on May 12, 2023, an alligator gar measuring less than 2 feet was caught during a deweeding process in Dal Lake of Kashmir near the Sher-i-Kashmir International Conference Centre (SKICC), sparking concerns about potential effects on the ecosystem.

In Thailand, an alligator gar have long been considered an imported aquarium fish. In reports of their discovery in various natural water sources, believed that they were released by aquarists. In 2024, they were reported in the Mekong River in Chiang Rai Province, a natural border between Thailand, Laos, and Myanmar, alongside Siberian sturgeon.

== Human uses ==
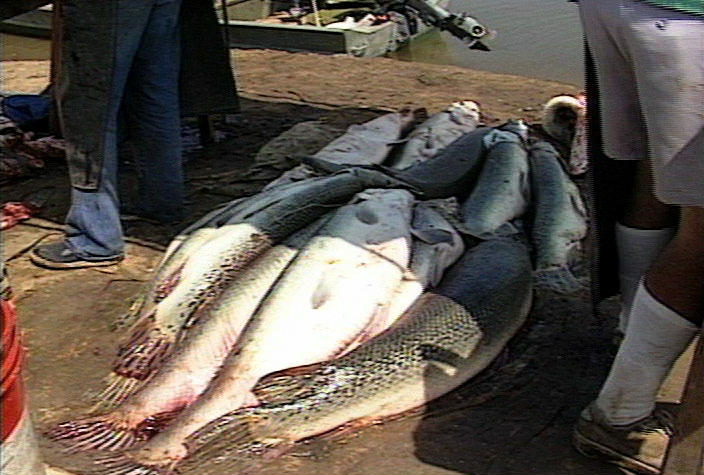
Choke Canyon Reservoir controlled gar harvest, 1995

On-site processing by commercial fishermen

=== Early history ===
Native Americans in the South and Caribbean peoples used the alligator gar's ganoid scales for arrow heads, breastplates, and as shielding to cover plows. Early settlers tanned the skins to make a strong, durable leather to cover their wooden plows, make purses, and craft various other items. Gar oil was also used by the people of Arkansas as a repellent for buffalo gnats.

For nearly half a century, alligator gar were considered "trash fish", or "nuisance species" by state and federal authorities who targeted them for elimination to protect gamefish populations, and to prevent alleged attacks on humans, a claim that remains unsubstantiated with the exception of occasional injuries sustained from captured alligator gar thrashing around on the decks of boats. Fishermen participated in the slaughter of thousands of alligator gar believing they were providing a great service. In 1992, PBS affiliate KUHT channel 8 became the presenting station for a public-outreach program that documented the life history cycle of alligator gar titled The Alligator Gar: Predator or Prey?. It was the first documentary ever produced and televised nationally about alligator gar at a time when it was still being referred to as a trash fish. The half-hour program ran for three years as part of an educational series titled "Exotic and Unusual Fishes", produced by Earthwave Society. It first aired in primetime during the 1992 July sweeps, and drew a 2.8 rating/4 share, making it the number-one rated program of the evening for several PBS affiliates. A decade passed before any significant action was taken to protect and preserve the remaining populations of alligator gar in the United States. Among the first to enact restoration and management practices was the Missouri Department of Conservation in partnership with Tennessee, Arkansas, Kentucky, Illinois, Alabama, Mississippi, Texas, Oklahoma, and Louisiana.

=== Sport fish ===
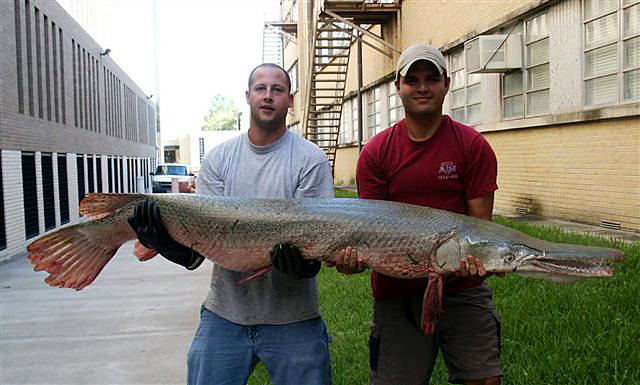
A 6 ft (1.8 m) 129 lb (59 kg) alligator gar caught in Texas, 2004

The long-time public perception of alligator gar as trash fish or a nuisance species has changed, with increasing national and international attention on the species as a sport fish, which some have attributed to features on popular television shows. Oklahoma, Texas, Arkansas, Mississippi, and Louisiana allow regulated sport fishing of alligator gar. Texas has one of the best remaining fisheries for alligator gar, and in concert with its efforts to maintain a viable fishery, imposed a one-per-day bag limit on them in 2009. The Texas state record, and world record for the largest alligator gar caught on rod and reel, is 283 lb (128.37 kg), taken by Arthur Weston on September 2, 2023, from Sam Rayburn Lake in Texas. Alligator gar are also quite popular among bowfishers because of their large size, trophy potential, and fighting ability. The Texas state bowfishing record was set in 2001 by Marty McClellan with a 290 lb (130 kg) alligator gar from the Trinity River. The all-tackle record was a 302 lb (137 kg) alligator gar caught on a trotline in 1953 by T.C. Pierce Jr. In 1991, fishing guide Kirk Kirkland anecdotally reported catching an alligator gar measuring 9 ft 6 in (2.90 m) on rod and line from the Trinity River.

=== Commercialization and aquaculture ===
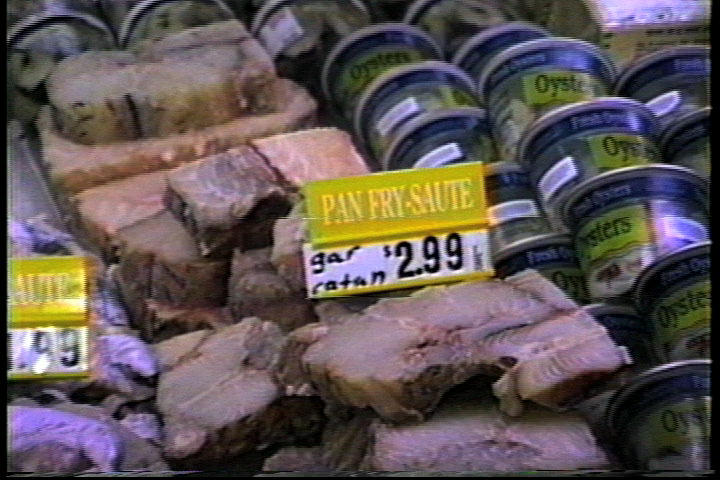
Market display of gar fillets

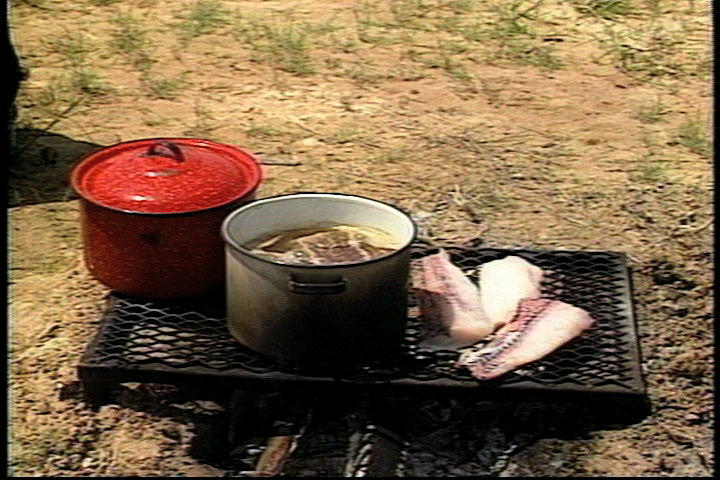
Gar fillets grilled and boiled

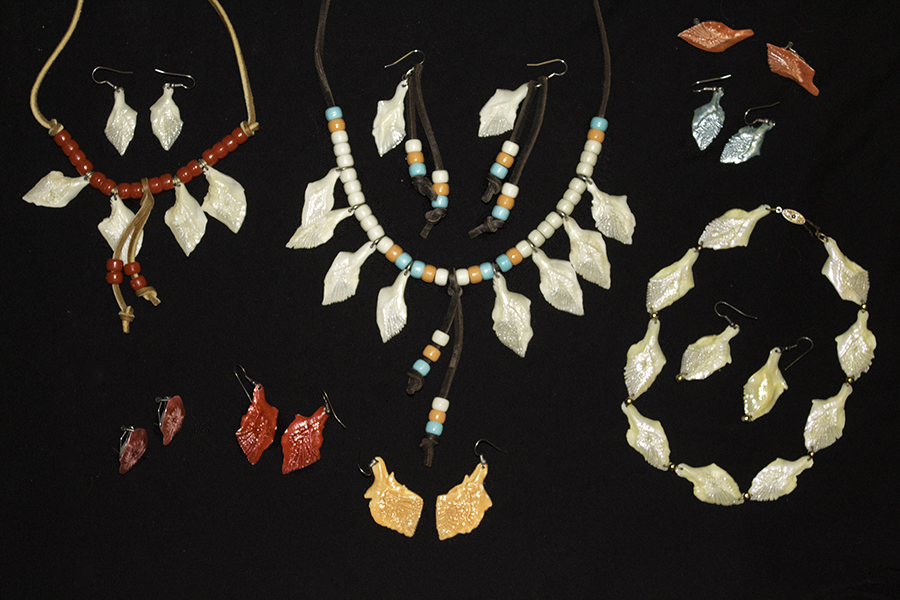
Ganoid scale jewelry

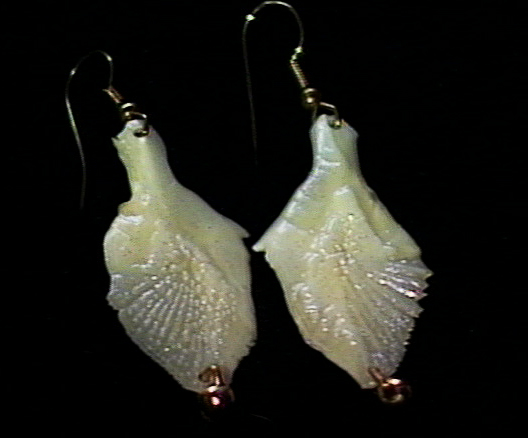
Ganoid scale earrings

Declining populations of alligator gar throughout their historic range have resulted in the need to monitor wild populations and regulate commercial harvests. Alligator gar have a high yield of white-meat fillets and a small percentage of waste relative to body weight. Fried gar balls, grilled filets, and fillets boiled in water with crab boil are popular dishes in the southern United States. There is also a small cottage industry that designs and sells jewelry made from the ganoid scales of alligator gar; some tan the hides to produce leather for making lamp shades, purses and a host of other novelty items. Historically, the price of wild gar meat sold commercially to wholesale distributors has fluctuated between $1.00/lb up to $2.50/lb. Retail prices in supermarkets and specialty stores have ranged from $3.00 to $3.50/lb.

Atractosteus gars, including alligator gar, tropical gars, and Cuban gars, are considered good candidates for aquaculture, particularly in developing regions, where their rapid growth, disease resistance, easy adaptation to artificial feeds as juveniles, and ability to tolerate low water quality are essential. Their ability to breathe in both air and water eliminates the need for costly aeration systems and other technology commonly used in aquaculture. Despite being considered "trash" or "rough" fish in most of North America, in regions of Central America and the southern United States they have become a popular food fish. Maintaining wild populations of gars has grown in importance to maintaining sustainable aquaculture for "local food production, the aquarium trade, and conservation of biodiversity".

=== Aquaria ===
Despite the large size alligator gar can attain, they are kept as aquarium fish, though many fish labeled as "alligator gar" in the aquarium trade are actually smaller species. Alligator gar require a very large aquarium or pond, and ample resources for them to thrive in captivity. They are also a popular fish for public aquaria and zoos. In many areas, keeping alligator gar as pets is illegal, but they occasionally show up in fish stores. Alligator gar are highly prized and sought after for private aquaria, particularly in Japan until it was prohibited in 2018. According to some reports, large alligator gar could fetch as much as US$40,000 in what some consider the "Japanese black market". In June 2011, three men from Florida and Louisiana were indicted on charges of illegally removing wild alligator gar from the Trinity River in Texas, and attempting to ship them to Japan for private collectors. The indictments resulted from an undercover sting operation by special agents with the U.S. Fish and Wildlife Service, the Texas Parks and Wildlife Department, and the Florida Fish and Wildlife Conservation Commission. The charges included violations of three separate provisions of the Lacey Act, specifically conspiracy to submit a false label for fish transported in interstate commerce, conspiracy to transport fish in interstate commerce in violation of state law or regulation, and conspiracy to transport and sell fish in interstate commerce in violation of state law or regulation. Two of the conspirators entered guilty pleas to one count, and the government dropped the other two charges against them. A third conspirator went to trial on all three counts, was acquitted on one count, and found guilty on two. The district court sentenced him to serve nine months in prison followed by one year of supervised release. The case was appealed, and on April 15, 2014, the appellate court affirmed the judgment of the district court.
