= 2014 in reptile paleontology =

This list of fossil reptiles described in 2014 is a list of new taxa of fossil reptiles that were described during the year 2014, as well as other significant discoveries and events related to reptile paleontology that occurred in 2014.

== Ichthyopterygians ==
=== Research ===
- Anatomy, taxonomy and phylogenetic relationships of Cretaceous ophthalmosaurids Simbirskiasaurus birjukovi and Pervushovisaurus bannovkensis are reevaluated by Fischer et al. (2014).

=== New taxa ===
Name	Novelty	Status	Authors	Age	Unit	Location	Notes	Images
Janusaurus	Gen. et sp. nov	Valid	Roberts et al.	Late Jurassic	Agardhfjellet Formation	Norway	An ophthalmosaurid ichthyosaur. The type species is Janusaurus lundi. Zverkov & Prilepskaya (2019) considered Janusaurus to be a junior synonym of the genus Arthropterygius, though the authors maintained J. lundi as a distinct species within the latter genus; Delsett et al. (2019) rejected this synonymy.	
Leninia	Gen. et sp. nov	Valid	Fischer et al.	Early Cretaceous (early Aptian)		Russia	An ophthalmosaurine ophthalmosaurid ichthyosaur. The type species is Leninia stellans.	
Sisteronia	Gen. et sp. nov	Valid	Fischer et al.	Cretaceous (early Albian to early Cenomanian)	Cambridge Greensand; Gault Formation; Marnes Bleues Formation	France; United Kingdom	A platypterygiine ophthalmosaurid ichthyosaur. The type species is Sisteronia seeleyi.	
Undorosaurus trautscholdi	Sp. nov	Valid	Arkhangelsky & Zverkov	Late Jurassic		Russia	An ophthalmosaurine ophthalmosaurid ichthyosaur, a species of Undorosaurus.	

== Sauropterygians ==
Name	Novelty	Status	Authors	Age	Unit	Location	Notes	Images
Aristonectes quiriquinensis	Sp. nov	Valid	Otero et al.	Late Cretaceous (late Maastrichtian)	Quiriquina Formation	Chile	A plesiosaur, a species of Aristonectes.	
Cymatosaurus erikae	Sp. nov	Valid	Maisch	Middle Triassic (earliest Anisian)	Röt Formation	Germany	A species of Cymatosaurus.	
Majiashanosaurus	Gen. et sp. nov	Valid	Jiang et al.	Early Triassic (Olenekian)	Nanlinghu Formation	China	A basal member of Eosauropterygia. The type species is Majiashanosaurus discocoracoidis.	
Nothosaurus zhangi	Sp. nov	Valid	Liu et al.	Middle Triassic (Anisian)	Guanling Formation	China	A nothosaur, a species of Nothosaurus.	
Odoiporosaurus	Gen. et sp. nov	Valid	Renesto, Binelli & Hagdorn	Middle Triassic (Anisian)	Besano Formation	Italy	A pachypleurosaur. The type species is Odoiporosaurus teruzzii.	
Pararcus	Gen. et sp. nov	Valid	Klein & Scheyer	Middle Triassic (early Anisian)	Vossenveld Formation	Netherlands	A placodont. The type species is Pararcus diepenbroeki.	
Pliosaurus patagonicus	Sp. nov	Valid	Gasparini & O'Gorman	Late Jurassic (middle Tithonian)	Vaca Muerta Formation	Argentina	A species of Pliosaurus.	

== Lepidosaurs ==
=== Newly named rhynchocephalians ===
Name	Novelty	Status	Authors	Age	Unit	Location	Notes	Images
Kawasphenodon peligrensis	Sp. nov	Valid	Apesteguia, Gómez & Rougier	Palaeocene	Salamanca Formation	Argentina	An opisthodontian sphenodontid, a species of Kawasphenodon.	
Priosphenodon minimus	Sp. nov	Valid	Apesteguia & Carballido	Early Cretaceous	Cerro Barcino Formation	Argentina	An eilenodontine sphenodontid, a species of Priosphenodon.	

=== Newly named lizards ===
Name	Novelty	Status	Authors	Age	Unit	Location	Notes	Images
Blanus mendezi	Sp. nov	Valid	Bolet et al.	Miocene (11.6 Mya)	Vallès-Penedès Basin	Spain	An amphisbaenian, a species of Blanus.	
Blanus thomaskelleri	Sp. nov	Valid	Čerňanský, Rage & Klembara	Early Miocene		Germany	An amphisbaenian, a species of Blanus.	
Calanguban	Gen. et sp. nov	Valid	Simões, Caldwell & Kellner	Early Cretaceous	Crato Formation	Brazil	Originally described as a scleroglossan lizard with scincomorph affinities; subsequently argued to be a borioteiioid. The type species is Calanguban alamoi.	
Dakotaseps	Nom. nov	Valid	Nydam	Late Cretaceous (Cenomanian)	Dakota Formation	United States	A member of Scincomorpha of uncertain phylogenetic placement, assigned by Nydam (2013) to an informal paramacellodid-cordylid grade; a replacement name for Dakotasaurus Nydam (2013) (preoccupied).	
Funiusaurus	Gen. et sp. nov	Valid	Xu et al.	Late Cretaceous	Qiupa Formation	China	A member of Polyglyphanodontidae. The type species is Funiusaurus luanchuanensis.	
Maioricalacerta	Gen. et sp. nov	Valid	Bailon et al.	Early Pliocene (Zanclean)		Spain	A member of Lacertidae. The type species is Maioricalacerta rafelinensis.	
Pyrenasaurus	Gen. et sp. nov	Valid	Bolet & Augé	Late Eocene		France; Spain	A member of Scincoidea, possibly a skink. The type species is Pyrenasaurus evansae.	

=== Newly named snakes ===
Name	Novelty	Status	Authors	Age	Unit	Location	Notes	Images
Adinophis	Gen. et sp. nov	Valid	Pritchard et al.	Late Cretaceous (Maastrichtian)	Maevarano Formation	Madagascar	A member of Madtsoiidae. The type species is Adinophis fisaka.	
Indophis fanambinana	Sp. nov	Valid	Pritchard et al.	Late Cretaceous (Maastrichtian)	Maevarano Formation	Madagascar	A member of Nigerophiidae, a species of Indophis.	
Rukwanyoka	Gen. et sp. nov	Valid	McCartney et al.	Oligocene	Nsungwe Formation	Tanzania	The most ancient booid snake and boa from Africa. The type species is Rukwanyoka holmani.	
Seismophis	Gen. et sp. nov	Valid	Hsiou et al.	Late Cretaceous (Cenomanian)	Alcântara Formation	Brazil	A snake of uncertain phylogenetic placement, possibly a relative of Najash rionegrina. The type species is Seismophis septentrionalis.	

== Turtles ==
=== Research ===
- Redescription of the rediscovered holotype of the Jurassic turtle Plesiochelys etalloni is published by Anquetin, Deschamps & Claude (2014).

=== Newly named turtles ===
Name	Novelty	Status	Authors	Age	Unit	Location	Notes	Images
Alienochelys	Gen. et sp. nov	Valid	de Lapparent de Broin et al.	Late Cretaceous (Maastrichtian)	Oulad Abdoun Basin	Morocco	A sea turtle, a member of Dermochelyoidae. The type species is Alienochelys selloumi.	
Allaeochelys libyca	Sp. nov	Valid	Havlik, Joyce & Böhme	Miocene (Langhian)		Libya	A relative of the pig-nosed turtle, a species of the (possibly paraphyletic) genus Allaeochelys.	
Ashleychelys	Gen. et sp. nov	Valid	Weems & Sanders	Oligocene		United States	A pancheloniid sea turtle. The type species is Ashleychelys palmeri.	
Atolchelys	Gen. et sp. nov	Valid	Romano et al.	Early Cretaceous (Barremian)	Morro do Chaves Formation	Brazil	A bothremydid pleurodiran. The type species is Atolchelys lepida.	
Brodiechelys royoi	Sp. nov	Valid	Pérez-García, Gasulla & Ortega	Early Aptian	Arcillas de Morella Formation	Spain	A xinjiangchelyid, a species of Brodiechelys.	
Cheirogaster bacharidisi	Sp. nov	Valid	Vlachos, Tsoukala & Corsini	Pliocene	Gonia Formation	Greece	A tortoise, originally described as a species belonging to the genus Cheirogaster. Subsequently, transferred by Pérez-García & Vlachos (2014) to the genus Titanochelon.	
Eodortoka	Gen. et sp. nov	Valid	Pérez-García, Gasulla & Ortega	Early Cretaceous (Aptian)	Arcillas de Morella Formation	Spain	A dortokid, a member of the clade Pan-Pleurodira (containing living pleurodirans and all turtles that are more closely related to them than to cryptodirans). The type species is Eodortoka morellana.	
Gobiapalone	Gen. et comb. et sp. nov	Valid	Danilov et al.	Late Cretaceous (Cenomanian to Maastrichtian)	Barun Goyot Formation; Bayan Shireh Formation; Nemegt Formation	Mongolia	A trionychine trionychid. The type species is "Amyda" orlovi Khosatzky (1976); genus also contains new species Gobiapalone breviplastra. The genus Gobiapalone was considered to be a junior synonym of the genus Kuhnemys by Georgalis & Joyce (2017), though the authors maintained G. orlovi and G. breviplastra as distinct species within the latter genus.	
Hylaeochelys kappa	Sp. nov	Valid	Pérez-García & Ortega	Late Jurassic (Tithonian)	Freixial Formation	Portugal	A basal member of Eucryptodira, a species of Hylaeochelys.	
Judithemys kranzi	Sp. nov	Valid	Weems	Paleocene (early Thanetian)	Aquia Formation	United States	A member of (likely paraphyletic) group "Macrobaenidae", a species of Judithemys.	
Nemegtemys	Gen. et sp. nov	Valid	Danilov et al.	Late Cretaceous (Maastrichtian)	Nemegt Formation	Mongolia	A cyclanorbine trionychid. The type species is Nemegtemys conflata.	
Osonachelus	Gen. et sp. nov	Valid	de Lapparent de Broin et al.	Eocene (late Bartonian)	Vic-Manlleu Marls Formation	Spain	A cheloniid sea turtle. The type species is Osonachelus decorata.	
Procolpochelys charlestonensis	Sp. nov	Valid	Weems & Sanders	Oligocene		United States	A pancheloniid sea turtle; a species of Procolpochelys.	
Riodevemys	Gen. et sp. nov	Valid	Pérez-García, Royo-Torres & Cobos	Late Jurassic		Spain	A pleurosternid paracryptodiran. The type species is Riodevemys inumbragigas.	
Tacuarembemys	Gen. et sp. nov	Valid	Perea et al.	Late Jurassic or earliest Cretaceous	Tacuarembó Formation	Uruguay	A turtle of uncertain phylogenetic placement. The type species is Tacuarembemys kusterae.	
Titanochelon	Gen. et comb. nov	Valid	Pérez-García & Vlachos	Early Miocene to early Pleistocene		Austria; Bulgaria; France; Germany; Greece; Portugal; Spain; Switzerland; Turkey; Malta?	A tortoise; a new genus for "Testudo" bolivari Hernández-Pacheco (1917). Genus also contains "Testudo" eurysternum Gervais (1848–1852), "Testudo" ginsburgi de Broin (1977), "Testudo" vitodurana Biedermann (1862), "Cheirogaster" steinbacheri Karl (1996), "Testudo" leberonensis Depéret (1890), "Testudo" schafferi Szalai (1931), "Testudo" perpiniana Depéret (1885) and "Cheirogaster" bacharidisi Vlachos et al. (2014). Genus might also contain "Testudo" gymnesicus Bate (1914).	
'Trionyx' baynshirensis	Sp. nov	Valid	Danilov et al.	Late Cretaceous (Cenomanian to Santonian)	Bayan Shireh Formation	Mongolia	A trionychine trionychid, a species of Trionyx sensu lato.	
'Trionyx' dissolutus	Sp. nov	Valid	Vitek & Danilov	Late Cretaceous (Cenomanian)		Uzbekistan	A trionychid, a species of Trionyx sensu lato.	
'Trionyx' gilbentuensis	Sp. nov	Valid	Danilov et al.	Late Cretaceous (Maastrichtian)	Nemegt Formation	Mongolia	A trionychine trionychid, a species of Trionyx sensu lato.	
'Trionyx' gobiensis	Sp. nov	Valid	Danilov et al.	Late Cretaceous (Maastrichtian)	Nemegt Formation	Mongolia	A trionychine trionychid, a species of Trionyx sensu lato.	
'Trionyx' shiluutulensis	Sp. nov	Valid	Danilov et al.	Late Cretaceous (Campanian)		Mongolia	A trionychine trionychid, a species of Trionyx sensu lato.	

== Archosauromorphs ==
=== Basal archosauromorphs ===
==== Research ====
- A redescription of Tasmaniosaurus triassicus is published by Ezcurra (2014).
- A revision of anatomy and phylogenetic relationships of the archosauriform Dorosuchus neoetus is published by Sookias et al. (2014).
- A revision of putative euparkeriids from the Triassic of China is published by Sookias et al. (2014).

==== New taxa ====
Name	Novelty	Status	Authors	Age	Unit	Location	Notes	Images
Aenigmastropheus	Gen. et sp. nov	Valid	Ezcurra, Scheyer & Bulter	Late Permian (Wuchiapingian)	Usili Formation	Tanzania	A non-archosauriform archosauromorph, probably a protorosaurian. The type species is Aenigmastropheus parringtoni.	
Garjainia madiba	Sp. nov	Valid	Gower et al.	Early Triassic (late Olenekian)	Burgersdorp Formation	South Africa	An erythrosuchid archosauriform, a species of Garjainia.	
Hyperodapedon tikiensis	Sp. nov	Valid	Mukherjee & Ray	Late Triassic	Tiki Formation	India	A rhynchosaur, a species of Hyperodapedon.	
Proterosuchus goweri	Sp. nov	Valid	Ezcurra & Butler	Early Triassic		South Africa	A proterosuchid archosauriform, a species of Proterosuchus.	
Pseudochampsa	Gen. et comb. nov	Valid	Trotteyn & Ezcurra	Late Triassic (late Carnian or earliest Norian)	Ischigualasto Formation	Argentina	A proterochampsid archosauriform; a new genus for "Chanaresuchus" ischigualastensis Trotteyn, Martínez & Alcober (2012).	

== Other reptiles ==
Name	Novelty	Status	Authors	Age	Unit	Location	Notes	Images
Abyssomedon	Gen. et sp. nov	Valid	Macdougall & Reisz	Early Permian	Garber Formation	United States	A nyctiphruretid parareptile. The type species is Abyssomedon williamsi.	
Atopodentatus	Gen. et sp. nov	Valid	Cheng et al.	Middle Triassic (Anisian)	Guanling Formation	China	A marine reptile, probably a relative of sauropterygians. The type species is Atopodentatus unicus.	
Cartorhynchus	Gen. et sp. nov	Valid	Motani et al.	Lower Triassic	Nanlinghu Formation	China	A basal member of Ichthyosauriformes. The type species is C. lenticarpus. Published online in 2014; the final version of the article naming it was published in 2015.	
Delorhynchus cifellii	Sp. nov	Valid	Reisz, Macdougall & Modesto	Early Permian	Garber Formation	United States	A parareptile relative of lanthanosuchoids, a species of Delorhynchus.	
Eohupehsuchus	Gen. et sp. nov	Valid	Chen et al.	Early Triassic	Jialingjiang Formation	China	A hupehsuchian. The type species is Eohupehsuchus brevicollis.	
Horaffia	Gen. et sp. nov	Valid	Klein & Hagdorn	Middle Triassic (Ladinian)	Erfurt Formation	Germany	A marine diapsid reptile of uncertain phylogenetic placement. The type species is Horaffia kugleri.	
Largocephalosaurus qianensis	Sp. nov	Valid	Li et al.	Triassic	Guanling Formation	China	A member of Saurosphargidae, a species of Largocephalosaurus.	
Parahupehsuchus	Gen. et sp. nov	Valid	Chen et al.	Early Triassic	Jialingjiang Formation	China	A hupehsuchian. The type species is Parahupehsuchus longus.	
