= Paleontology in Uruguay =

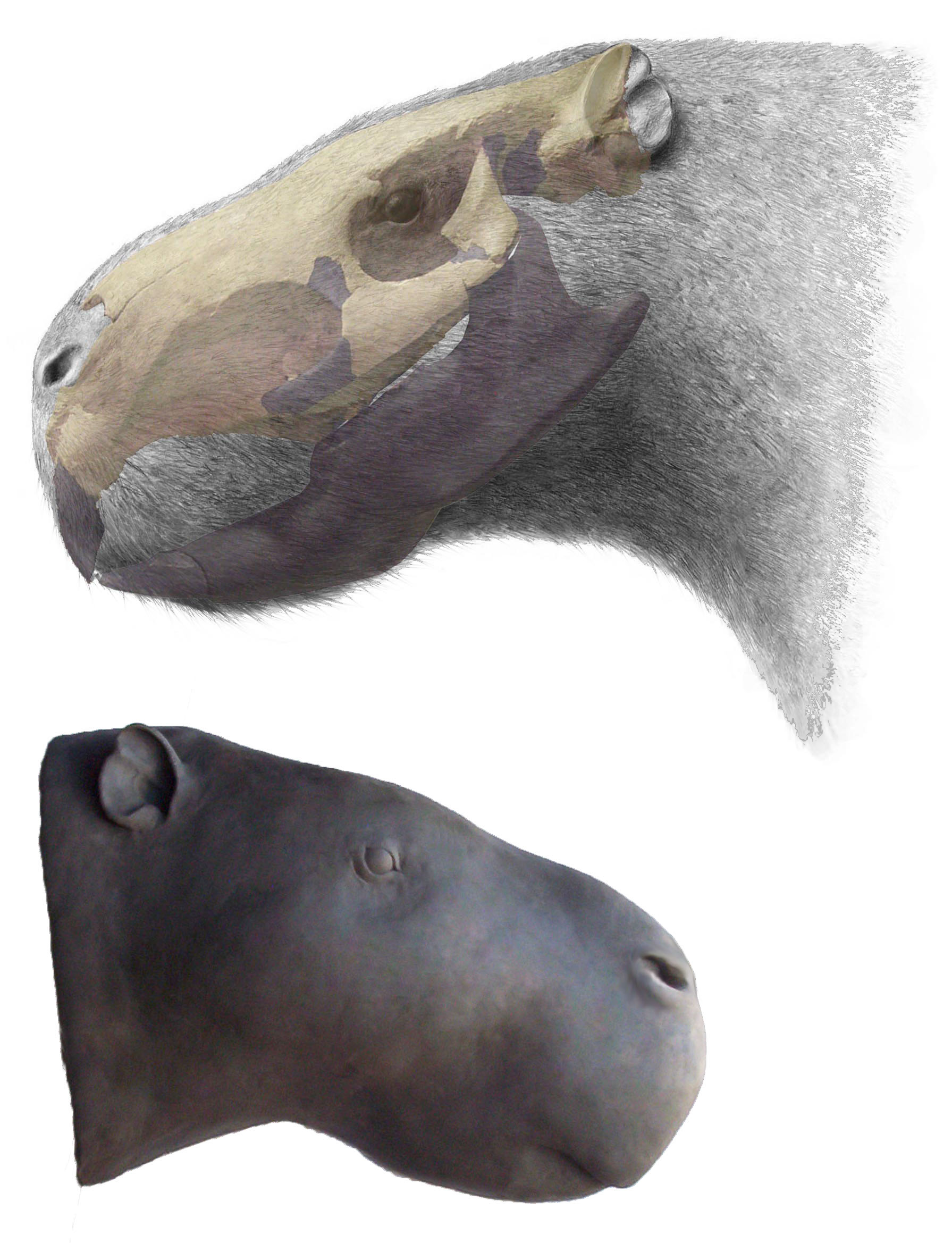
Reconstruction of the head of Josephoartigasia monesi, the largest discovered rodent

In Uruguay, paleontology has been influenced by various academic centers, both Uruguayan and foreign; in recent decades, it has become professionalized mainly at the University of the Republic. There is a significant local bibliographic output that offers a historical perspective and an overview of the current state of the science. The most developed areas include paleobiology and the systematics of Quaternary faunas, biostratigraphy, and research technologies, in close relation to disciplines such as physics, oceanography, archaeology, and design. Noteworthy are the numerous findings of megafauna mammals, which later became extinct, some in the Late Pleistocene extinctions, others due to human activity in a long time ago , such as Lestodon, Glyptodon, Doedicurus, Notiomastodon, etc.

The paleontological locality of Arroyo del Vizcaíno, Canelones Department, was declared a National Monument in 2021.

== History ==
During the Spanish colonial period, naturalist Félix de Azara explored the region. Although he was not a professional paleontologist, he took notes on his discoveries in geography, flora, fauna, climate, etc.; as such, he contributed to the development of local natural history. His writings influenced Charles Darwin and other scientists. Interestingly, in 1833 Darwin purchased the skull of "one of the strangest animals ever discovered" in Uruguay. Based on this material, in 1837 Richard Owen described the Toxodon platensis; as a matter of fact, the great English palaeontologist identified several genera of extinct species from material found in Uruguay.

The true pioneer of Uruguayan paleontology was the clergyman Dámaso Antonio Larrañaga, who actively promoted the creation of the National Museum of Natural History. Decades later, some paleontologists from Argentina were very influential, such as Florentino Ameghino and Lucas Kraglievich.

In 1932, while drilling a water well in Guichón, several skeletal remains belonging to seven specimens of small terrestrial crocodiles were discovered. The remains were sent to Argentine paleontologists and, after several vicissitudes, Carlos Rusconi recognized a new genus in 1933, Uruguaysuchus. It has been important from a taxonomic and phylogenetic point of view in the Crocodyliformes group of the Cretaceous period in Gondwana (Guichón Formation). To date, Uruguaysuchus remains the best-represented Mesozoic vertebrate in Uruguay.

A remarkable discovery was made of the biggest rodent ever found. In 1966, on the cliffs of Barrancas de San Gregorio, on Kiyú beach in the San José Department, material corresponding to enormous fossils was collected, including a fragment of the lower jaw that preserves the lower part of the incisor, the premolar, the first two molars, a cavity corresponding to the third molar, and the ramus (the part of the lower jaw that joins the skull). Uruguayan paleontologists Julio César Francis and Álvaro Mones made it the type specimen of a new genus and species, Artigasia magna, named in honor of the Uruguayan national figure José Artigas. Years later, Mones renamed the genus Josephoartigasia. In 2008, Uruguayan paleontologist Andrés Rinderknecht and Uruguayan physicist Rudemar Ernesto Blanco described another species, J. monesi, based on a huge, nearly complete skull, also from Barrancas de San Gregorio. The name pays tribute to Mones for his work on South American rodents.

A huge dinosaur (approximately 16 meters long) was described by Soto et al. in 2024 with the name Udelartitan celeste, based on material found in Quebracho, Paysandú. The name "Udelartitan" pays tribute to the University of the Republic, and "celeste" refers to the Uruguayan national soccer team. It is considered the first endemic dinosaur species in Uruguay.

In 2022, research was conducted in the Tacuarembó Formation. A tooth belonging to a new species of Jurassic dinosaur was found, belonging to the Abelisauridae family. It is the third Jurassic carnivorous dinosaur found in Uruguay, following previous records of Ceratosaurus and Torvosaurus.

== Museums ==
Several museums display notable paleontological collections. Among others:

- National Museum of Natural History (Montevideo)
- Municipal Museum (Colonia del Sacramento)
- Prof. Roselli Municipal Museum (Nueva Palmira)
- Prof. Armando Calcaterra Palaeontological Museum (Real de San Carlos)

In Tacuarembó Department there is an open-air museum in form of a trail, the Dinosaur Route (Spanish: Ruta de los Dinosaurios, the first of its class in the country. It is made up of dinosaur footprints and other paleontological material.

== Paleontologists ==
- Álvaro Mones
- Graciela Piñeiro
- Francisco Lucas Roselli
- Armando Calcaterra

== Fossils found in Uruguay ==
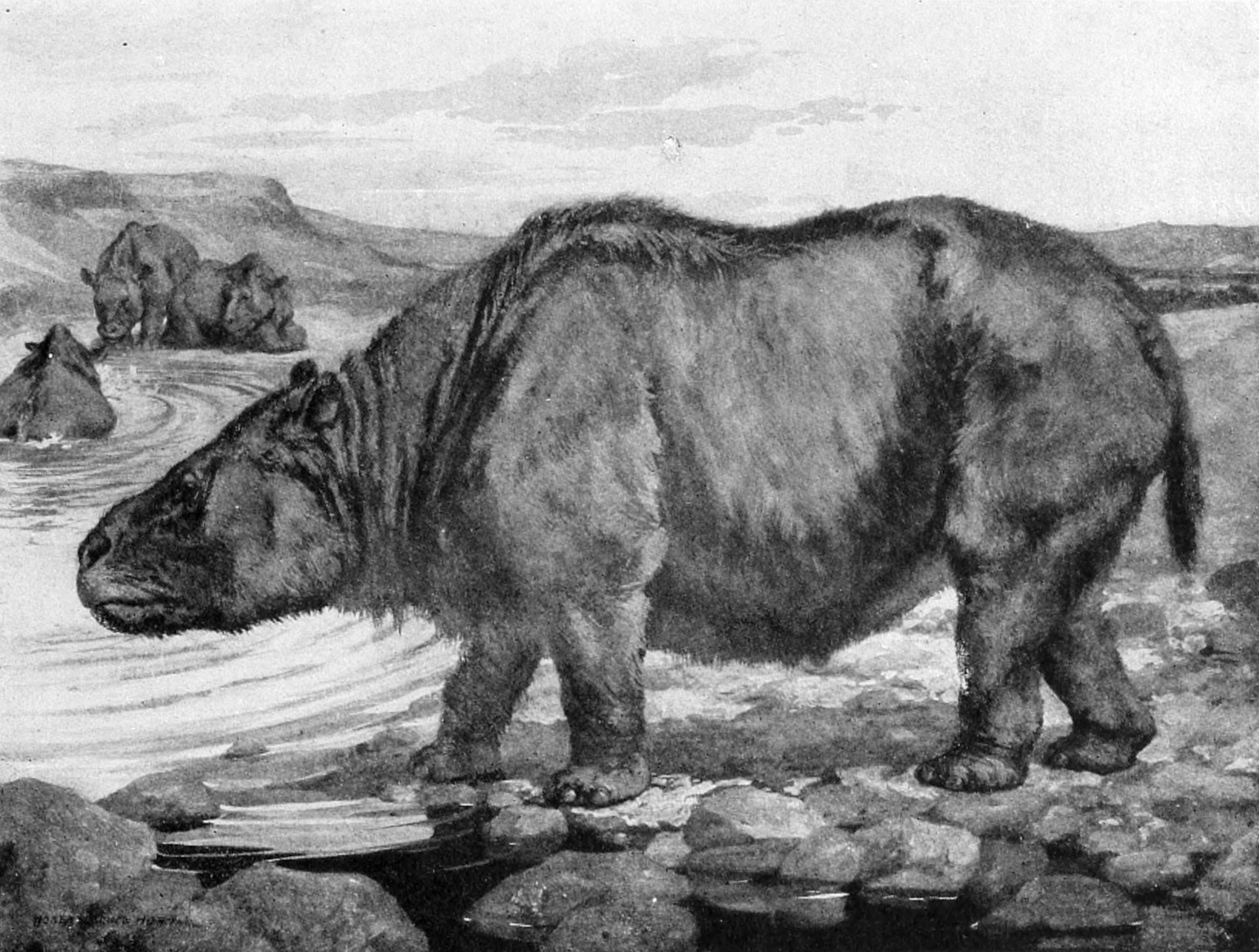
Reconstruction of Toxodon platensis, described based on remains brought back by Charles Darwin from his visit to Uruguay

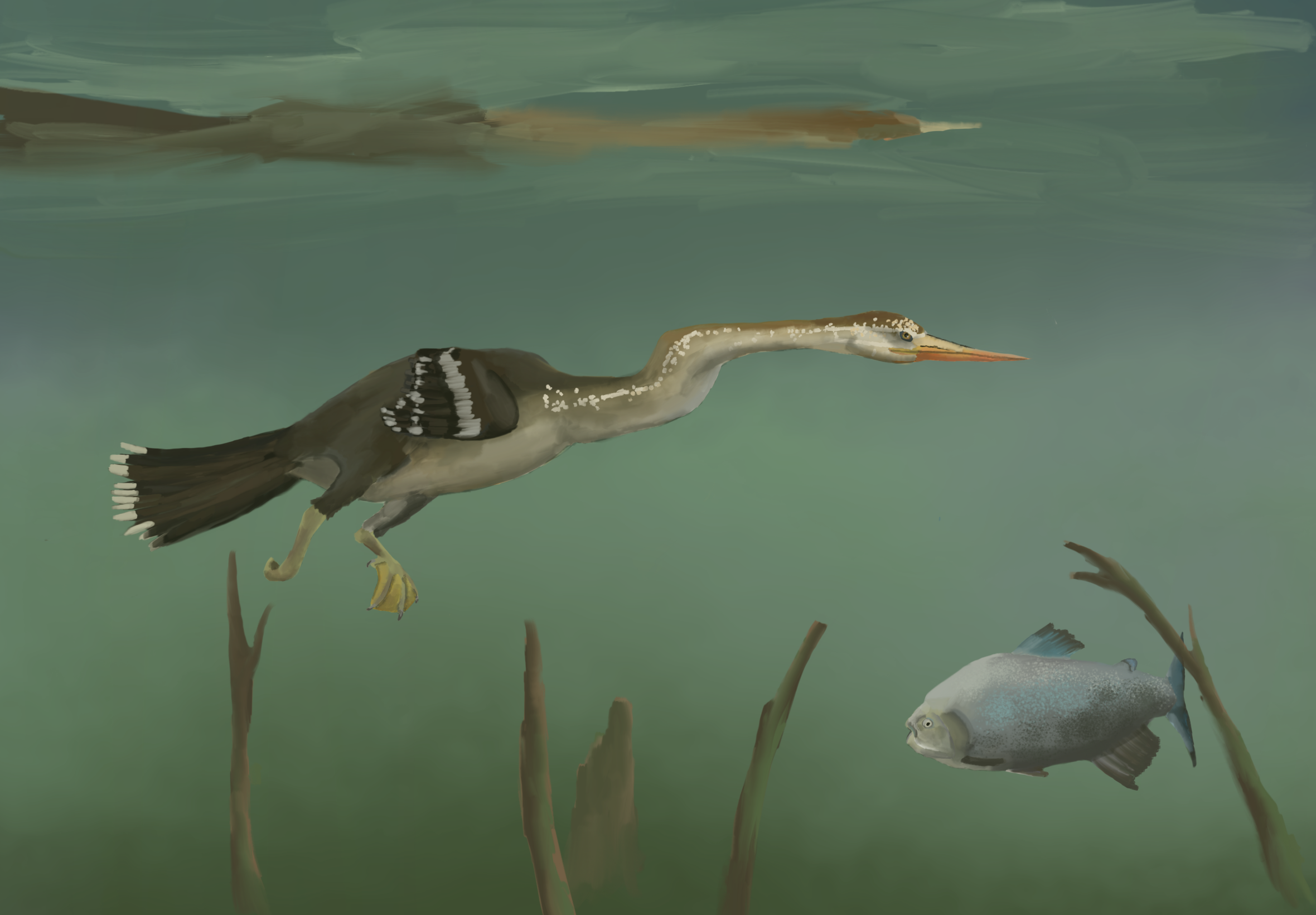
Reconstruction of a Giganhinga roaming the waterways accompanied by a Tambaqui

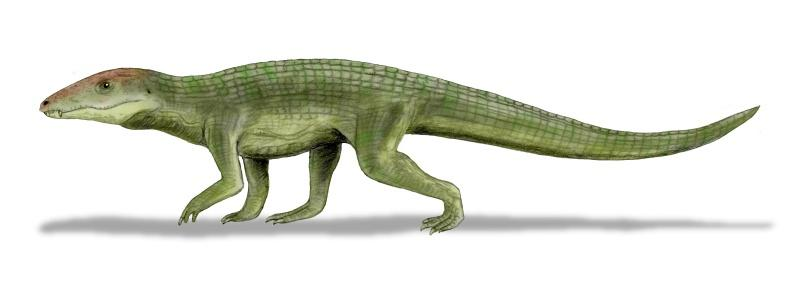
Reconstruction of Uruguaysuchus aznarezi, a crocodylomorph from the Late Cretaceous of Uruguay

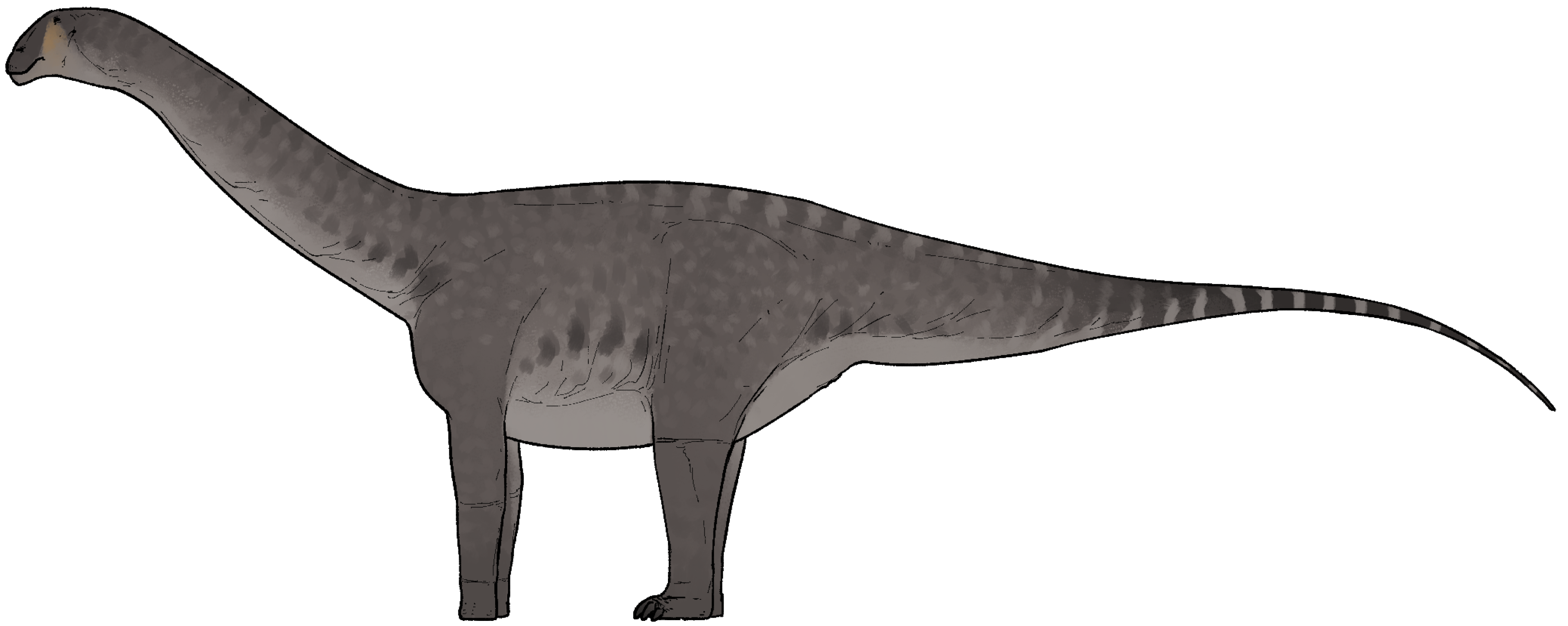
Life restoration of Udelartitan celeste

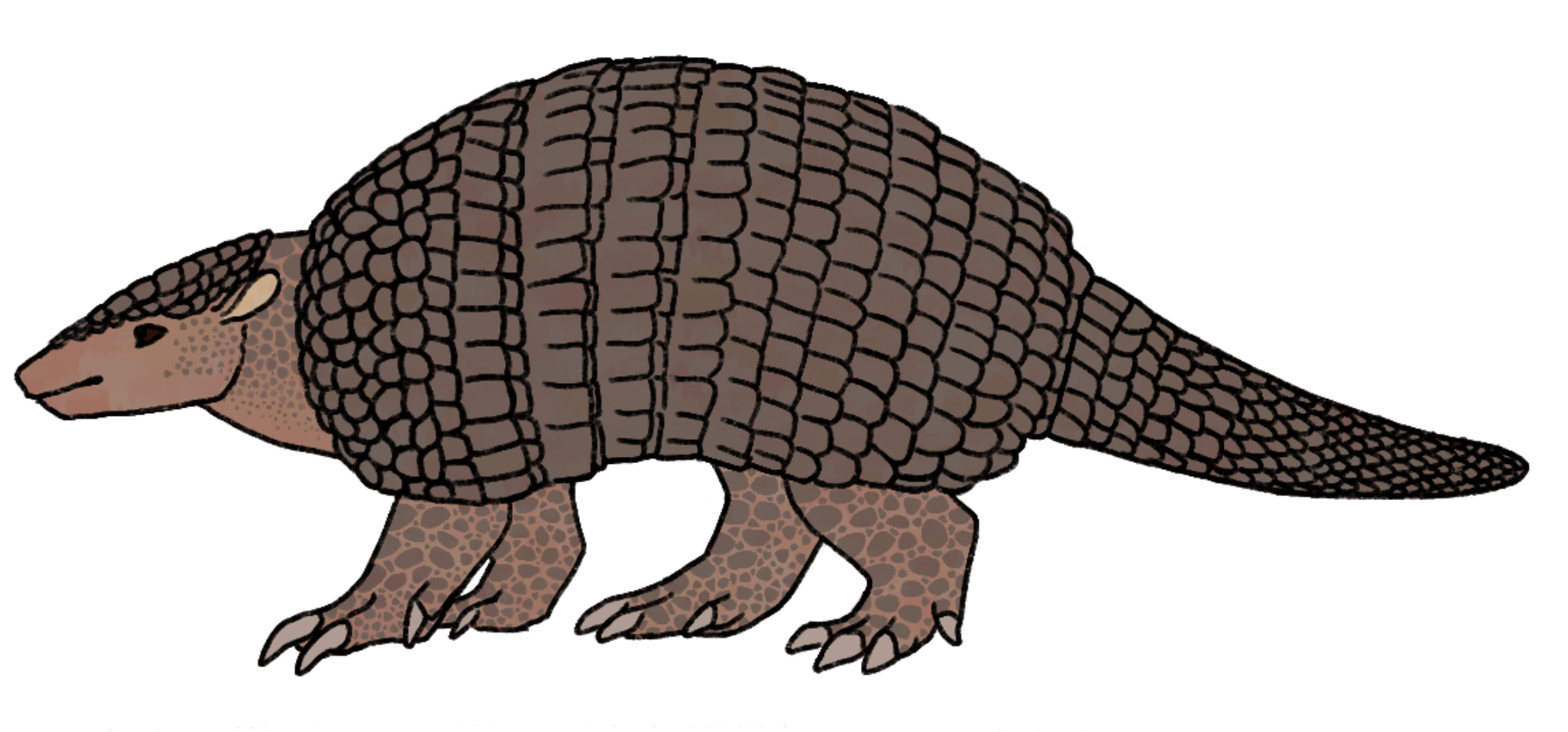
Reconstruction of Kraglievichia

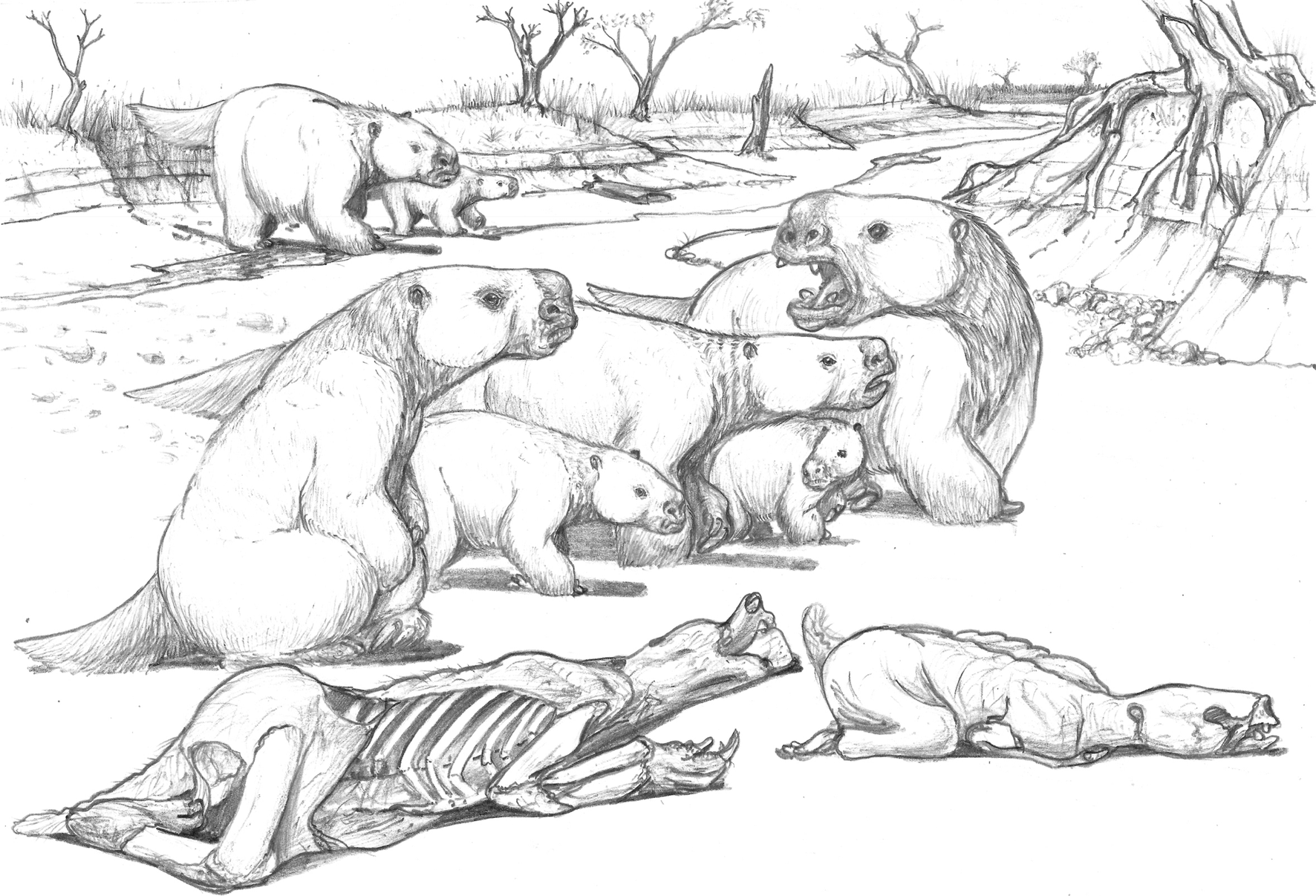
Life restoration of Lestodon

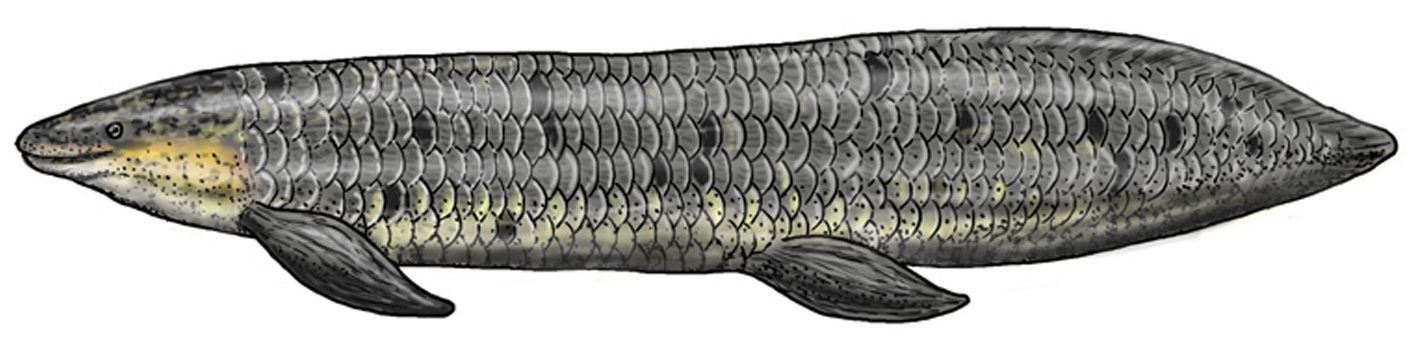
Life restoration of Arganodus tiguidiensis

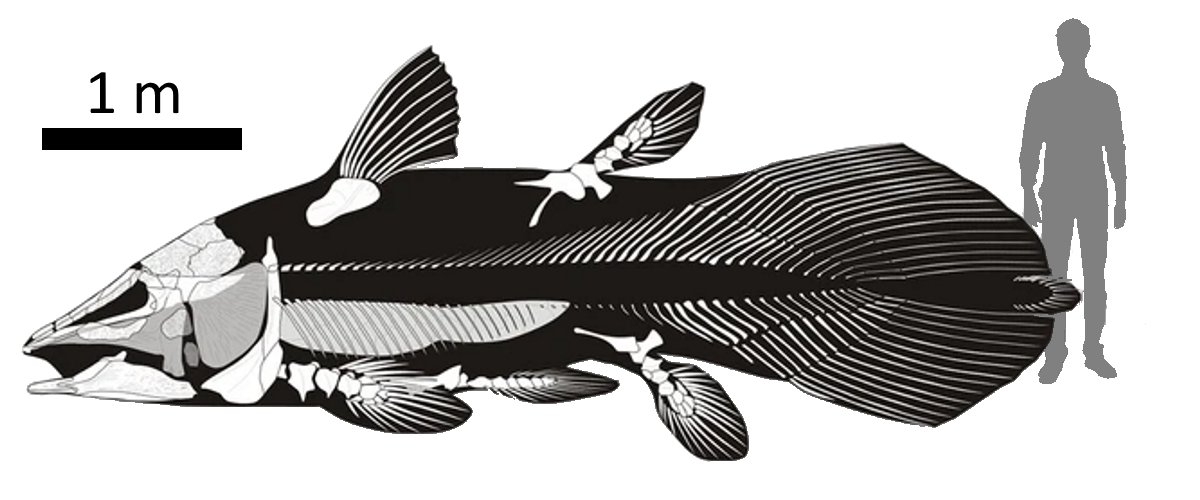
Reconstructed skeleton of the largest known individual of Mawsonia gigas

=== Trace fossils ===
In the departments of Florida, Soriano and Durazno were found:

- Coprinisphaera
- Corimbatichnus fernandezi
- Elipsoideichnus meyeri
- Monesichnus
- Palmiraichnus
- Rebuffoichnus
- Teisseirei
- Uruguay

=== Mammals ===
In the territory of present-day Uruguay, it is possible to find a large number of skeletal remains that allow us to reconstruct extinct mammals. The superorder Xenarthra stands out (ground sloths, cingulates.

- Antifer (Ameghino, 1889), a cervid
- Arazamys (Rinderknecht et al., 2011), a dinomyid rodent
- Catonyx tarijensis (Gervais & Ameghino, 1880), a ground sloth
- Charruatoxodon uruguayensis (Ferrero et al., 2022), a notoungulate
- Doedicurus clavicaudatus (Owen, 1847), a cingulate
- Dusicyon avus (Burmeister, 1866), a canid
- Eopachyrucos pliciformis (Ameghino, 1901), a notoungulate
- Fiandraia romeii (Roselli, 1976), a notoungulate
- Glossotherium (Owen, 1840), a ground sloth
- Glyptodon (Owen, 1839), a cingulate
- Hippidion (Owen, 1869), an equid
- Isostylomys (Kraglievich, 1926), a rodent
- Josephoartigasia magna (Francis & Mones, 1966), a rodent
- Josephoartigasia monesi (Rinderknecht & Blanco, 2008), a rodent
- Kraglievichia (Castellanos, 1927), a cingulate
- Lestobradys (Rinderknecht et al., 2010), a ground sloth
- Lestodon armatus (Gervais, 1855), a ground sloth
- Macrauchenia patachonica (Owen, 1838), a litoptern
- Megatherium americanum (Cuvier, 1796), a ground sloth
- Morenelaphus brachyceros (Gervais & Ameghino, 1880), a cervid
- Neobrachytherium (Soria, 2001), a litoptern
- Neoglyptatelus uruguayensis (Fernicola et al, 2018), a cingulate
- Neolicaphrium recens (Frenguelli, 1921), a litoptern
- Neuryurus (Ameghino, 1889), a cingulate
- Notiomastodon platensis (Ameghino, 1888), a proboscidean
- Palaeolama (Gervais, 1869), a lamine camelid
- Pampatherium (Ameghino, 1875), a cingulate
- Panochthus tuberculatus (Owen, 1845), a cingulate
- Plaxhaplous canaliculatus (Ameghino, 1884), a cingulate
- Pronothrotherium (Ameghino, 1907), a ground sloth
- Protocyon (Giebel, 1855), a canid
- Protypotherium antiquum (Moreno, 1882), a notoungulate
- Scarrittia robusta (Ubilla et al., 1994), a notoungulate
- Smilodon fatalis (Leidy, 1869), a saber-toothed felid
- Smilodon populator (Lund, 1842), a saber-toothed felid
- Tetrastylus (Ameghino, 1886), a dinomyid rodent
- Toxodon platensis (Owen, 1837), a notoungulate
- Trigodon (Ameghino, 1887), a notoungulate
- Uruguayodon alius (Corona et al., 2019), a litoptern
- Uruguaytherium beauliei (Kraglievich, 1928), an astrapotherid
- Valgipes bucklandi (Lund, 1846), a ground sloth

=== Birds ===
- Devincenzia (Kraglievich, 1932), a cariamiform
- Giganhinga kiyuensis (Rinderknecht & Noriega, 2002), a suliform

=== Reptiles ===
- Abelisauridae (genera yet to be named)
- Antarctosaurus wichmannianus (Von Huene, 1929), a Cretaceous dinosaur
- Ceratosaurus (Marsh, 1884), a Jurassic dinosaur
- Meridiosaurus vallisparadisi (Mones, 1980), a Late Jurassic crocodylomorph
- Mesosaurus tenuidens (Gervais, 1865), an Early Permian marine reptile, dwelling in hypersaline waters (Gervais, 1865)
- Pintosaurus magnidentis (Piñeiro, Rojas & Ubilla, 2004), a Late Triassic parareptile
- Tacuadactylus luciae (Soto et al., 2021), a Late Jurassic ctenochasmatid pterosaur, the oldest from South America
- Tacuarembemys kusterae (Perea et al., 2014), a Late Jurassic to Early Cretaceous turtle
- Torvosaurus (Galton & Jensen, 1979), a Late Jurassic dinosaur
- Udelartitan celeste (Soto et al., 2024), a Cretaceous dinosaur
- Uruguaysuchus aznarezi (Rusconi, 1933), a Cretaceous crocodylomorph

==== Fossil eggs ====
- Sphaerovum erbeni (Mones, 1980), from the Cretaceous
- Tacuarembovum oblongum (Mones, 1980), from the Cretaceous

=== Temnospondyls ===
- Arachana nigra (Piñeiro et al., 2007), a Late Permian or Early Triassic stereospondyl
- Uruyiella liminea (Piñeiro et al., 2012), a Late Triassic stereospondyl

=== Fishes ===
- Arganodus tiguidiensis (Tabaste, 1963), a Jurassic lungfish
- Asiatoceratodus tiguidiensis (Vorobyeva, 1967), a lungfish from the Middle Triassic to the Cretaceous
- Coccocephalus tessellatus (Beltan, 1981), an early Permian marine basal ray-finned fish.
- Halecostomi indet.
- Mawsonia gigas (Woodward, 1907), a coelacanth from the late Jurassic to the mid-Cretaceous
- Neoceratodus africanus (Castelnau, 1876), a Cretaceous lungfish
- Otodus megalodon (Agassiz, 1835), a mackerel shark
- Priohybodus arambourgi (Erasmo, 1960), a shark from the Late Jurassic and Early Cretaceous
- Rhadinichthys (Traquair, 1877), a Carboniferous bony fish
- Semionotiformes indet.

=== Arthropods ===
- Barona arcuata (Calisto & Piñeiro, 2019), a Late Carboniferous or Early Permian cockroach
- Calmonia (Clarke, 1913), a Devonian trilobite
- Metacryphaeus (Reed, 1907), a Devonian trilobite

=== Molluscs ===
- Glaphyrites (Ruzhencev, 1936), an ammonoid

=== Plants ===
- Glossopteris (Brongniart, 1828), a Permian spermatophyte

== See also ==
- Geology of Uruguay
- List of fossiliferous stratigraphic units in Uruguay
