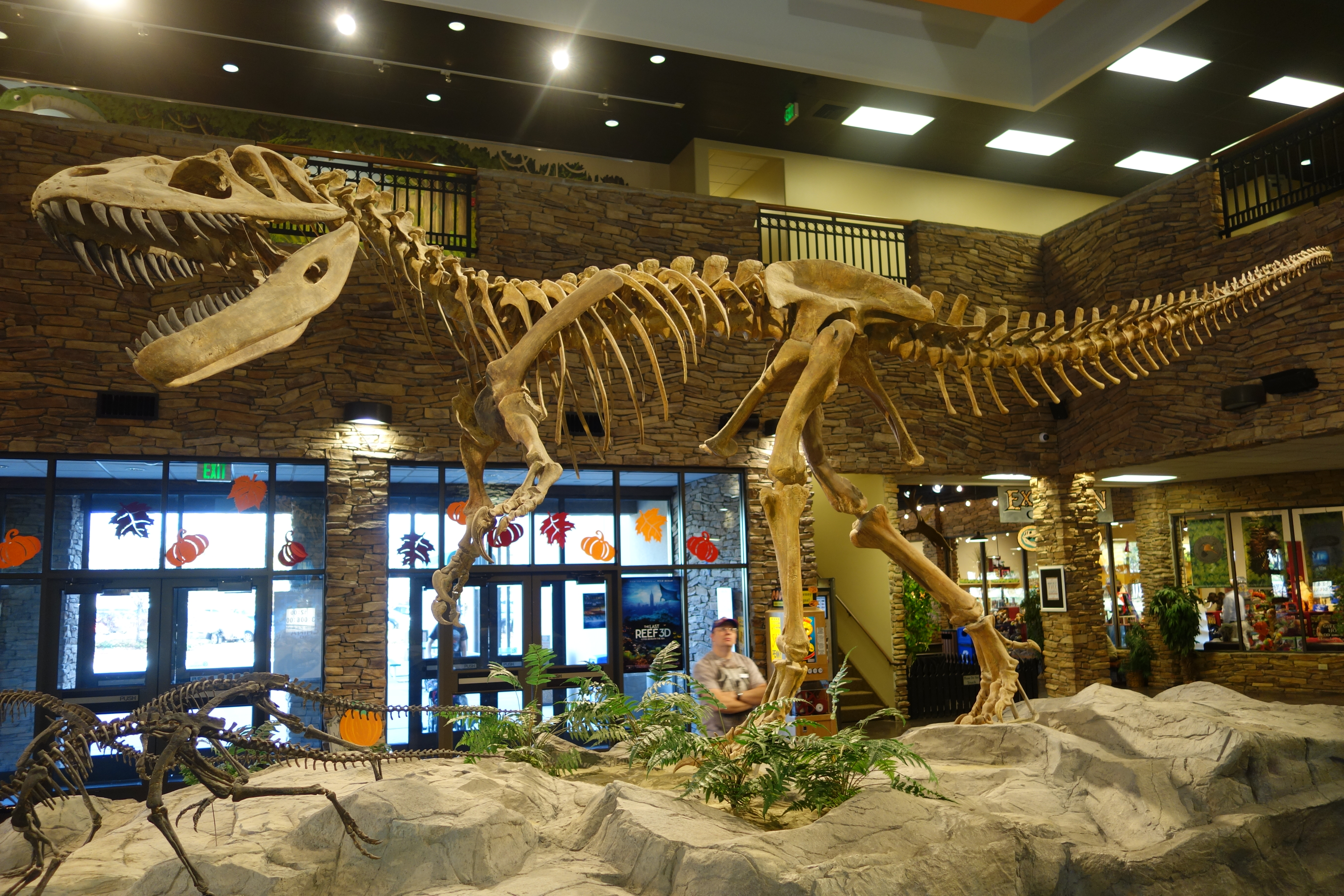
- Mounted T. tanneri skeletal reconstruction, Museum of Ancient Life

Scientific classification
- Kingdom: Animalia
- Phylum: Chordata
- Class: Reptilia
- Clade: Dinosauria
- Clade: Saurischia
- Clade: Theropoda
- Family: †Megalosauridae
- Subfamily: †Megalosaurinae
- Genus: †Torvosaurus; Galton & Jensen, 1979

Type species
- †Torvosaurus tanneri Galton & Jensen, 1979

Other species
- †T. gurneyi? Hendrickx & Mateus, 2014

Synonyms
- Ceratosaurus ingens? Janensch, 1920 (in part); Megalosaurus ingens? Janensch, 1920 (in part); Edmarka rex Bakker et al., 1992; "Brontoraptor" Siegwarth et al., 1996 (nomen nudum)

= Torvosaurus =

Torvosaurus Temporal range: Middle - Late Jurassic (Callovian to Tithonian), 165–146.5 Ma

Megalosaurid theropod dinosaur genus from Late Jurassic period

Torvosaurus (/ˌtɔːrvoʊˈsɔːrəs/) is a genus of large megalosaurine theropod dinosaur that lived approximately 165 to 146.5 million years ago during the Callovian to Tithonian ages of the late Middle and Late Jurassic period in what is now Colorado, Portugal, Germany, and possibly England, Spain, Tanzania, and Uruguay. It contains two named species, Torvosaurus tanneri and Torvosaurus gurneyi, plus a third unnamed species from Germany. However, the validity of T. gurneyi has recently been questioned.

In 1979, the type species Torvosaurus tanneri was named. Measuring around 9 meters (30 ft) long and weighing approximately 2–2.4 metric tons (2.2–2.6 short tons), T. tanneri was among the largest terrestrial carnivores in North America during the Late Jurassic. Specimens of Torvosaurus gurneyi were measured up to 10 meters (33 ft) in length and 4–5 metric tons (4.4–5.5 short tons) in body mass. Both species are regarded as being similar in size to each other. Based on bone morphology, Torvosaurus is thought to have had very powerful short arms.

== Discovery ==
=== Early discovery ===
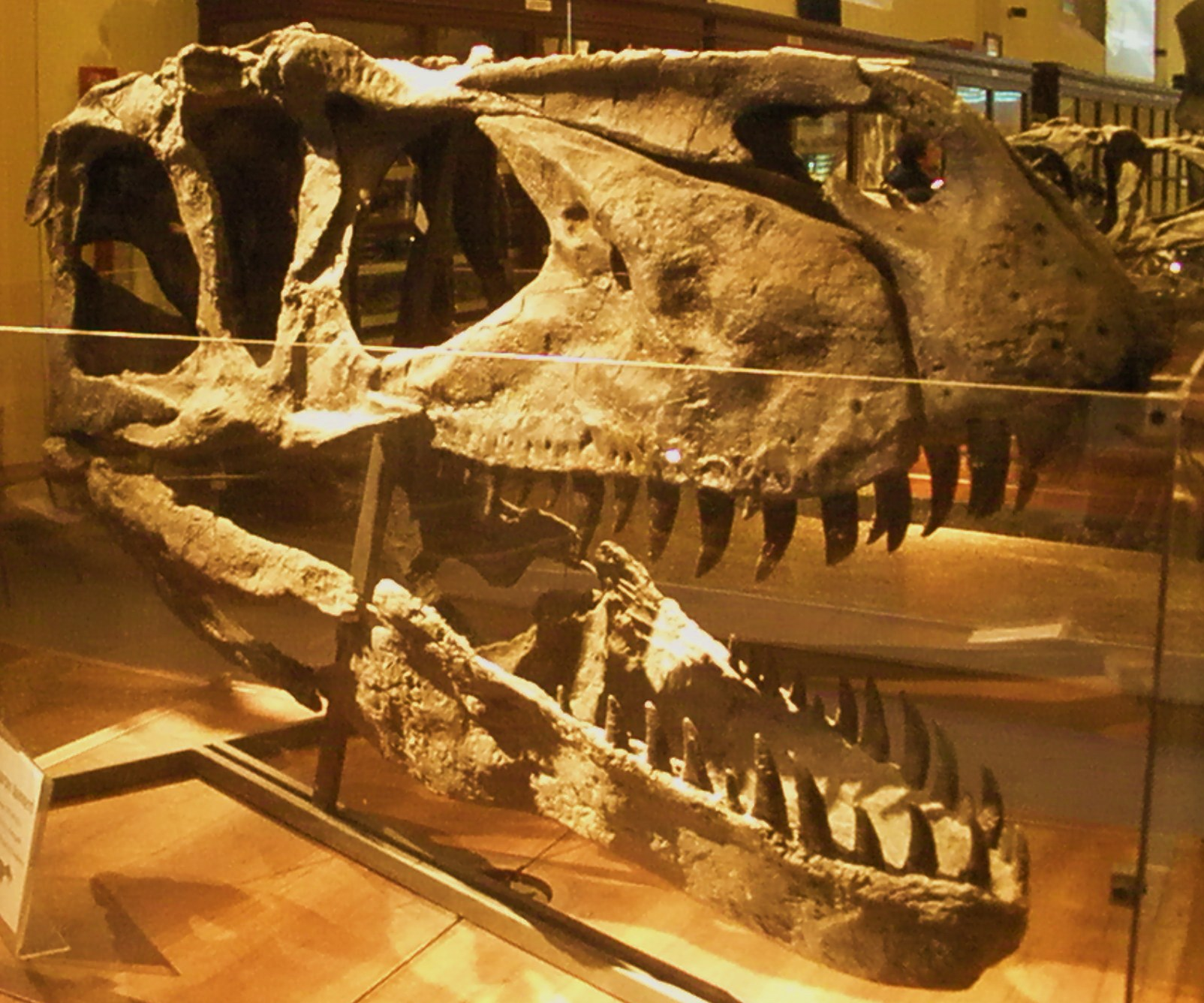
Reconstructed T. tanneri skull, Museo Capellini of Bologna, Italy

Fossilized remains of Torvosaurus have been found in North America, Portugal, Germany, and possibly in England, Spain, Tanzania, and Uruguay. The first discovered remains referable to Torvosaurus were discovered in 1899 by Elmer Riggs in the "Freeze-out Hills" of southeastern Wyoming, 18 kilometers (11 mi) northwest of Medicine Bow. The material consisted of part of the left foot and right hand and they were taken to the Field Museum of Natural History in Chicago, where they were stored until being re-discovered around 2010. The specimen was assigned to Torvosaurus tanneri after being described in 2014.

More remains of a large theropod that is now believed to have been Torvosaurus were discovered in the Tendaguru Formation of Tanzania and was named "Megalosaurus" ingens by Werner Janensch in 1920, based on the specimen MB R 1050, a 12-centimeter-long (4.7 in) tooth from German East Africa (now Tanzania). It was eventually reclassified as a probable member of Carcharodontosauridae before being reclassified as a probable member of the Torvosaurus genus in 2020. Although it was only referred to as Torvosaurus sp., one commentator has noted it could potentially be called Torvosaurus ingens. Soto et al. (2020) described teeth of a member of the genus Torvosaurus from the Tacuarembó Formation of Uruguay. The authors noted that some of the specimens of "Megalosaurus" ingens figured by Werner Janensch share the features of the Uruguayan material and stated that the materials from Tanzania and Uruguay may represent the same taxon, due to geographical proximity, but ultimately concluded that, based on only teeth, they do not share any derived characteristics to distinguish them from the described species of the genus, T. tanneri and T. gurneyi. However, Rauhut et al. (2020) consider the teeth to be undiagnostic, being coherent in size and shape with a variety of other theropods (including carcharodontosaurids), thus considering their attribution to the genus to be problematic. Soto et al. refuted Rauhut and colleagues in a reply,noting how they did not consider the distinct features that lead to the assignment of the crowns to Torvosaurus, although they stated the referral was still tentative. A later paper stated Torvosaurus had a diagnostic dentition, four to five dental autapomorphies.

=== Dry Mesa Quarry ===
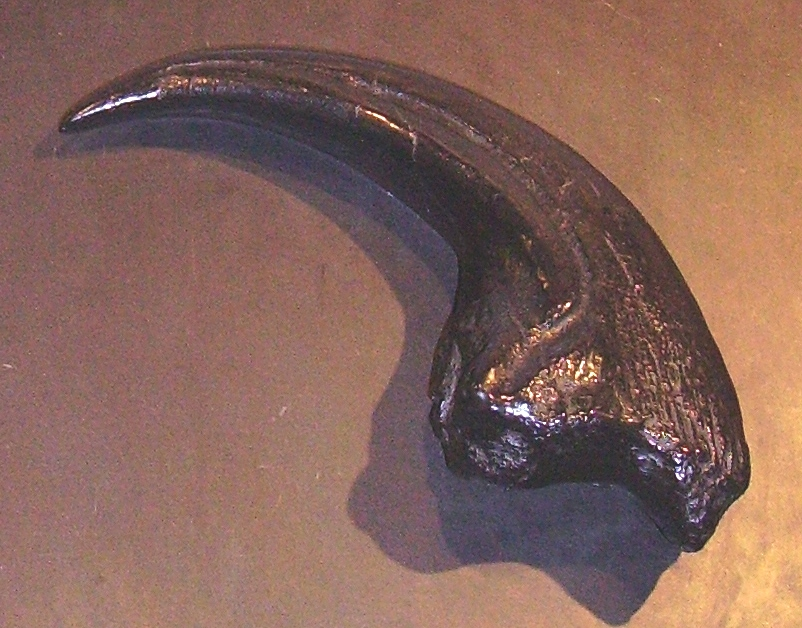
Claw cast of T. tanneri, Natural History Museum, London

In 1971, Vivian Jones of Delta, Colorado, in the Calico Gulch Quarry in Moffat County, discovered a single gigantic thumb claw of a theropod. This was shown to James Alvin Jensen, a collector who was working for Brigham Young University. In an effort to discover comparable fossils, Vivian's husband Daniel Eddie Jones directed Jensen to the Dry Mesa Quarry, where abundant gigantic theropod bones, together with Supersaurus remains, proved present in rocks of the Morrison Formation. From 1972 onward, the site was excavated by Jensen and Kenneth Stadtman. The type species Torvosaurus tanneri was named and described in 1979 by Peter Malcolm Galton and Jensen. The genus name Torvosaurus derives from the Latin word torvus, meaning "savage", and the Greek word sauros (σαυρος), meaning "lizard". The specific name tanneri comes from the, first counselor in the First Presidency of the Church of Jesus Christ of Latter-day Saints, Nathan Eldon Tanner.

In 1985, Jensen could report a considerable amount of additional material, among it being the first skull elements. The fossils from Colorado were further described by Brooks Britt in 1991. The holotype, BYU 2002, originally consisted of upper and lower arm bones. The paratypes included some back bones, hip bones, and hand bones. When the material described in 1985 is added, the main missing elements are the shoulder girdle and the thighbone. The original thumb claw, specimen BYUVP 2020, was only provisionally referred, as it had been found in a site 195 kilometers (121 mi) away from the Dry Mesa Quarry. The holotype and paratypes represented at least three individuals, these being two adults and a juvenile. In 1991, Britt concluded that there was no proof that the front limbs of the holotype were associated and chose the left humerus as the lectotype. Several single bones and teeth found in other American sites have been referred to Torvosaurus. The referred material of Torvosaurus from Dry Mesa consist of a litany of large megalosaurid bones from animals similar in size and robusticity to the type specimens. These bones are come from at least 2 individuals just as the type material does and overlapping bones indicate only one megalosaurid is present in the quarry. This is supported by the fact that the dozens of bones of Torvosaurus in Dry Mesa were found in only in a small corner of the quarry,with the holotype humerus being found in a local accumulation of cranial and postcranial material that came from the same species.

=== Edmarka rex and "Elvis" ===
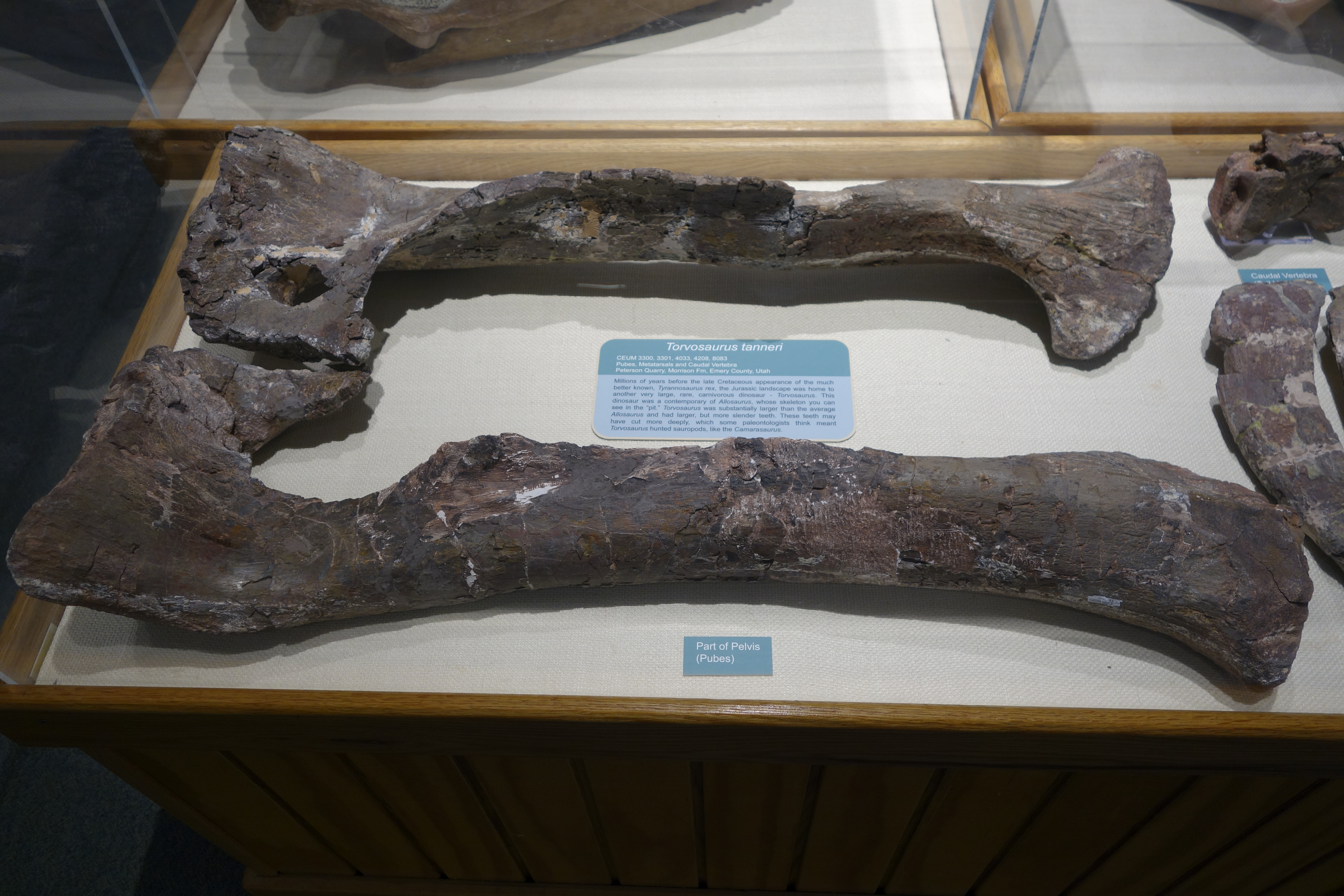
Pubic bones from Peterson Quarry, Utah

In 1992, fossils of a large theropod found at Como Bluff in Wyoming contained skull, shoulder girdle, pelvic, and rib elements. Robert T. Bakker and colleagues named the new species Edmarka rex based on these specimens, CPS 1001-1006 and CPS 1010, and suggested that it would rival Tyrannosaurus in size. In an unpublished 1996 manuscript, Siegwarth et al. (1996) re-examined the specimen TATE 0012 (then accessioned as CPS 1003) originally assigned to Edmarka rex by Bakker et al. (1992) from the same site, and stated that they initially considered to name this specimen "Brontoraptor", but decided to wait for more complete specimens to name this taxon officially, which renders this name a nomen nudum (informal name). Most researchers now regard both Edmarka rex and "Brontoraptor" as junior synonyms of Torvosaurus tanneri. In 2014, Sebastian Dalman suggested that while Edmarka rex and "Brontoraptor" are most likely junior synonyms of T. tanneri, the original incomplete specimens assigned to these taxa require re-examination as they lack detailed osteological descriptions to confirm or dispute this supposed synonymy.

In 2012, a 55% complete specimen was discovered in Colorado in the Skull Creek Quarry, which is an exposure of the Morrison Formation. The specimen, nicknamed "Elvis", included the pelvic, spine, and hind limb bones, a complete, associated backbone, as well as cranial elements. It is the most complete specimen of Torvosaurus found to date. A mounted skeleton of the specimen, with missing parts reconstructed with casts from other Torvosaurus specimens, is currently on display in the Museum of Natural History & Science in Cincinnati. Cranial remains of the specimen was officially published in 2026 under the specimen designation CMC VP15575.

=== European and Uruguayan discoveries ===
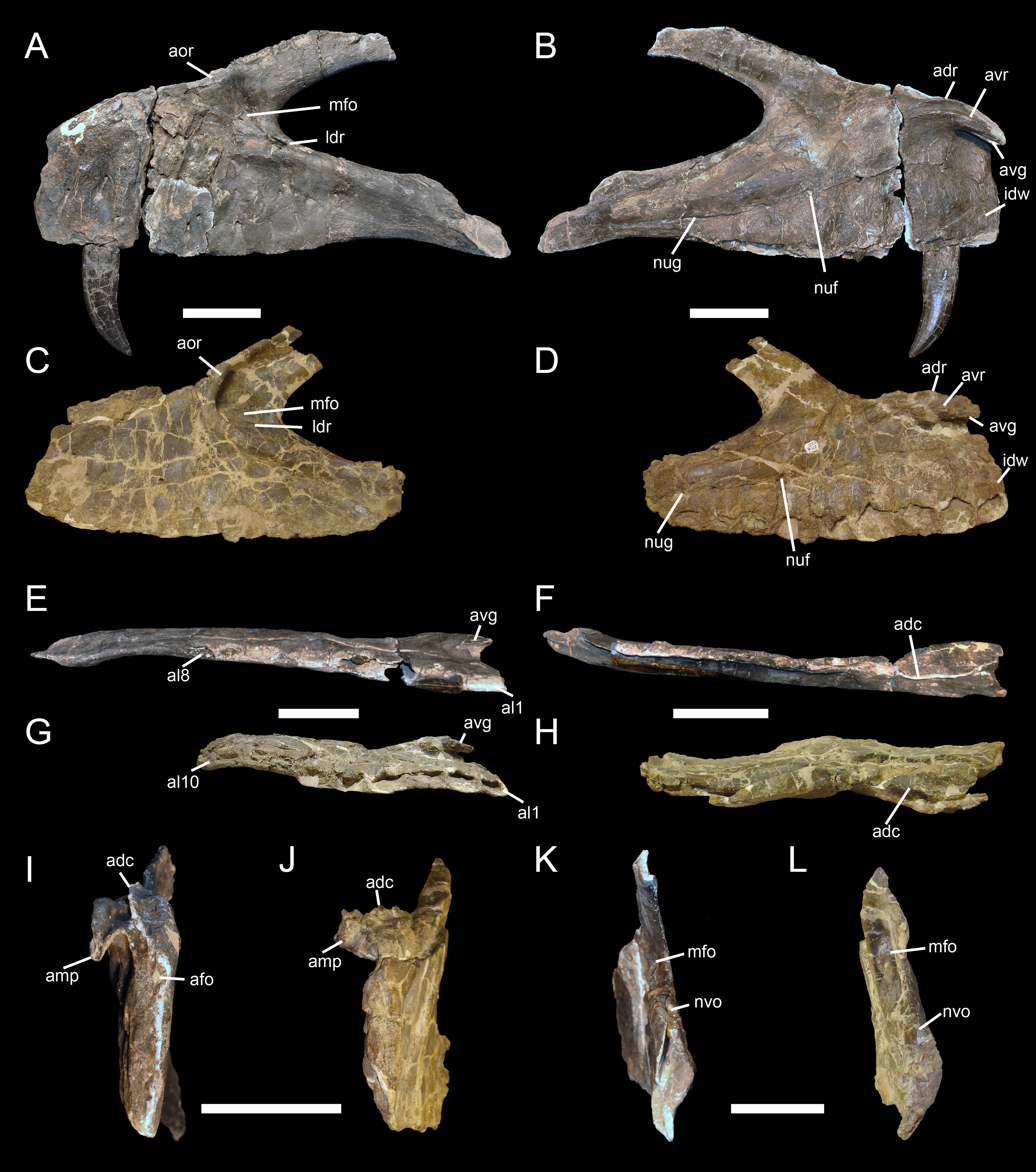
Maxillae of T. gurneyi and T. tanneri compared

In 2000, material from Portugal was referred to a Torvosaurus sp. by Octávio Mateus and Miguel Telles Antunes. In 2006, fossils from the Portuguese Lourinhã Formation were referred to Torvosaurus tanneri. In 2012, however, Matthew Carrano and colleagues concluded that this material could not be more precisely determined than a Torvosaurus sp. In 2013 and 2014, eggs with and without embryos were reported from Portugal and referred to Torvosaurus. The species from Portugal was named T. gurneyi in honor of James Gurney in 2014, the creator of the Dinotopia series of books. It is the largest named theropod known from Europe, although an isolated anterior caudal vertebra from the Vega Formation in Spain, which may belong to Torvosaurus or a closely related taxon, is about 15% larger than the one found on T. gurneyi. One of the describers of T. gurneyi argued the giant vertebrae from the Vega Formation likely in fact belonged to the species. It was the morphological distinctiveness of the holotype maxilla ML1100 that led to the naming of the Portuguese species. In 2017, a set of Portuguese cranial material assigned to Torvosaurus was described, including a specimen interpreted as belonging to the same individual as the holotype of T. gurneyi. Additional megalosauroid remains from the Lourinhã Formation were described in 2017; this litany of postcranial material was found in Praia da Corva, the same locality as two partial maxillae assigned to Torvosaurus. Although this material was noted to have some minor differences to North American Torvosaurus remains, it was deemed too incomplete to provide a more confident assignment beyond Megalosauroidea. The authors could not rule out the material belonging either to Torvosaurus or an indeterminate megalosauroid. Despite the minor differences, the authors did note the postcrania indeed possessed some features of Torvosaurus, such as anterior caudal facets wider than high, well marked pleurocentral depressions and great development of the pleurocoels in the dorsal vertebrae. At the Porto Dinheiro locality, a massive footprint with a length of at least 79 centimetres (2.59 ft) in pes length was found and assigned to Torvosaurus on the basis no other theropod in the formation was large enough to produce it. It is estimated the Torvosaurus that produced the track was 12 metres (39 ft) in length and 3.5 metres (11 ft) in hip height. Later studies upheld the referral and size estimations. Also found in the Porto Dinheiro locality were giant tooth crowns 15 centimetres (5.9 in) in crown height; these were referred to Torvosaurus.

In 2020, Soto and colleagues described FC-DPV 2971, a tooth from Uruguay, as belonging to a new unnamed species of Torvosaurus. They also assigned Megalosaurus/Ceratosaurus ingens (specimen MB R 1050) from Tanzania to Torvosaurus. Also in 2020, a fragmentary maxilla referable to Torvosaurus was described from the middle Callovian Ornatenton Formation of Germany. This is the record of the genus and suggests that megalosaurines originated in Europe, or at least that Europe was a biogeographical turntable for them from the Middle to the early Late Jurassic. Other possible Torvosaurus instances in Europe include fragmentary remains from the Kimmeridge Clay of England that possibly belong to the genus. These consist of a tibia (OUMNH J.29886) and a maxilla fragment that were collected separately from each other. In 2016 teeth regarded as likely coming from Torvosaurus were described from the Kimmeridgian of Germany.

== Description ==
Size comparison of the two species of Torvosaurus compared with a human

Torvosaurus was a very large and robust predatory dinosaur. Galton and Jensen initially estimated the body length of T. tanneri at 10 metres (33 ft) in their 1979 description of the taxon. Subsequent studies have estimated that adults reached 9–11 metres (30–36 ft) in length, and weighed up to 2–4.4 metric tons (2.2–4.9 short tons). Edmarka & "Brontoraptor" are large animals and are usually regarded as synonyms of T. tanneri. However, some researchers suggest that Edmarka rex and "Brontoraptor" may have been distinct from Torvosaurus. T. gurneyi is estimated to have measured 10–12 metres (33–39 ft) in length and weighed 4–5 metric tons (4.4–5.5 short tons). T. gurneyi is estimated to have a hip height of 3–3.5 metres (9.8–11.5 ft). The unnamed species from Germany is estimated to have been similar in size to T. tanneri.

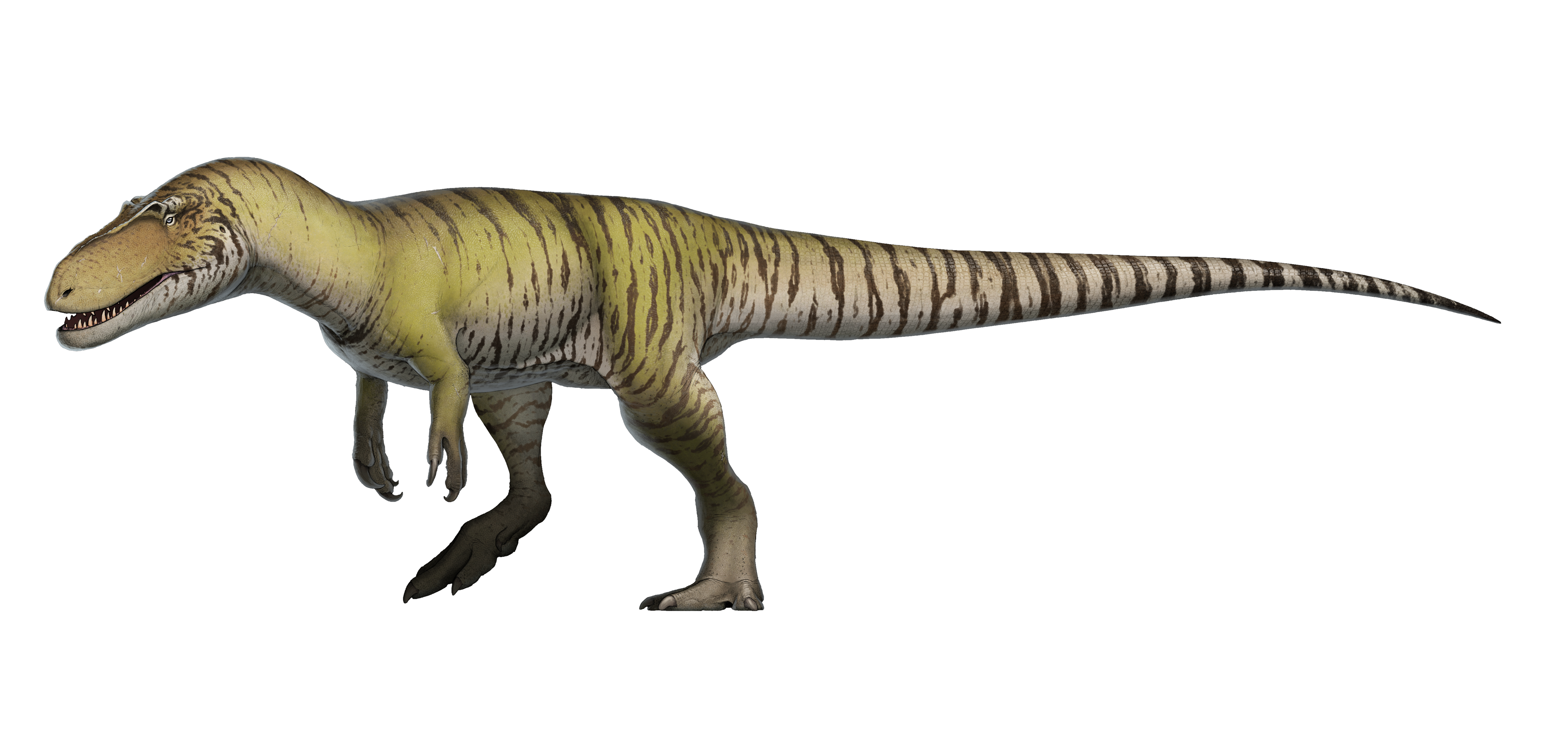
Restoration of T. tanneri

Among the differentiating features originally recognized between T. gurneyi and T. tanneri are the number of teeth, alongside the size and shape of the mouth. While the upper jaw of T. tanneri has more than 11 teeth, that of T. gurneyi has less. However, later examination of a new right maxilla, probably belonging to the same individual as the holotype of T. gurneyi, has determined that, while the two species can be distinguished based on the morphology of the maxillary medial wall and interdental plates, the supposedly lower number of maxillary teeth in the Portuguese form may be an artifact of preservation, since it is not possible to know the exact number of teeth in the complete maxilla at the moment.

In 2026, Warner-Cowgill and colleagues described the skull of the specimen nicknamed "Elvis", accessioned as CMC VP15575, and suggested that T. gurneyi is likely synonymous with T. tanneri. This is because, in their view, the differences in maxillary morphology between the two species are invalid. Firstly, the supposed differences in the maxillary medial wall is due to distortion in the topotypic specimen of T. tanneri so the morphology of the interdental wall cannot be properly evaluated. The absence of the ridge of the medial shelf was another trait that distinguished T. tanneri from T. gurneyi, but that trait is intraspecifically variable among T. tanneri so cannot be used to distinguish the two species. The final trait used to distinguish T. gurneyi from T. tanneri was the morphology of the ridges of the anteromedial process of the maxilla but this is variable among Portuguese Torvosaurus specimens so cannot be used as a diagnostic trait. The authors argued that the 1.2 m (3.9 ft) long skull of "Elvis" was greater in length and lower in height than previous reconstructions of Torvosaurus, and that "Elvis" measured around 10.4 m (34 ft) in total body length. The lack of an external fundamental system in "Elvis" indicates it was still growing at the time of death.

The material from Germany is further distinguished by the other two species by a temporal difference of c. 10 Ma and morphological differences which indicate that it was the third species outside a sister taxon relationship between T. tanneri and T. gurneyi. The material is only 10% smaller than the maxilla of T. tanneri, although the ontogenetic stage of the specimen is unknown. This indicates that derived megalosaurines were already among the largest terrestrial predators of the late Middle Jurassic, with only a moderate increase in size in the genus by the Late Jurassic. It can be distinguished from T. tanneri (and T. gurneyi, if it is valid) by the presence of a maxillary anteromedial pneumatic recess.

Torvosaurus had an elongated, narrow snout, with a kink in its profile just above the large nostrils. The frontmost snout bone, the premaxilla, bore three rather flat teeth oriented somewhat outwards with the front edge of the teeth crown overlapping the outer side of the rear edge of the preceding crown. The maxilla was tall and bore at least eleven rather long teeth. Like other megalosaurids, the largest teeth in the mouth of Torvosaurus were in the second to sixth maxillary alveoli. The antorbital fenestra was relatively short. The lacrimal bone had a distinctive lacrimal horn on top. Its lower end was broad in side view. The eye socket was tall with a pointed lower end. The jugal was long and transversely thin. The lower front side of the quadrate bone was hollowed out by a tear-shaped depression, the contact surface with the quadratojugal.

The maxilla of T. gurneyi is 63 centimetres (25 in) in length as preserved but is missing 8 centimetres (3.1 in) of the ventroposterior rim. This indicates the total length of T. gurneyi maxilla is 71 centimetres (28 in) in length. The teeth of T. tanneri are estimated to have been 9.5 centimetres (3.7 in) in crown height, with the largest known crown of T. tanneri reaching 10.5 centimetres (4.1 in) in length. The teeth of T. gurneyi were much bigger however, the holotype of T. gurneyi had teeth that measured from 10.6–11.6 centimetres (4.2–4.6 in) in crown height. The largest teeth of T. gurneyi were 15 centimetres (5.9 in) in crown height. T. gurneyi has the largest teeth of any theropod in the Lourinhã Formation. Amongst the large theropods of the Lourinhã Formation, only the teeth of Torvosaurus exceed 7.5 centimetres (3.0 in) in crown height. The largest teeth referred to T. gurneyi are thought to have possibly come from an individual that rivaled the giant Vega Formation megalosaurid in body size. The teeth of T. gurneyi rank among the largest theropod teeth ever discovered, only Spinosaurus & Tyrannosaurus possibly exceeded it in crown height.

Both the neck vertebrae and the front dorsal vertebrae had relatively flexible ball-in-socket joints. The balls on the front side of the vertebral centra had a wide rim, a condition by Britt likened to a Derby hat. The tail base was stiffened in the vertical plane by high and in side view wide neural spines. The toes of Torvosaurus are noted as being relatively short compared to other theropods, with short and stout pedal phalanges. The whole of the arm was very strong, but somewhat short. Whether the thumb claw was especially enlarged is uncertain. In the pelvis, the ilium resembled that of Megalosaurus and had a tall, short, front blade and a longer pointed rear blade. The pelvis as a whole was massively built, with the bone skirts between the pubic bones and the ischia contacting each other and forming a vaulted closed underside.

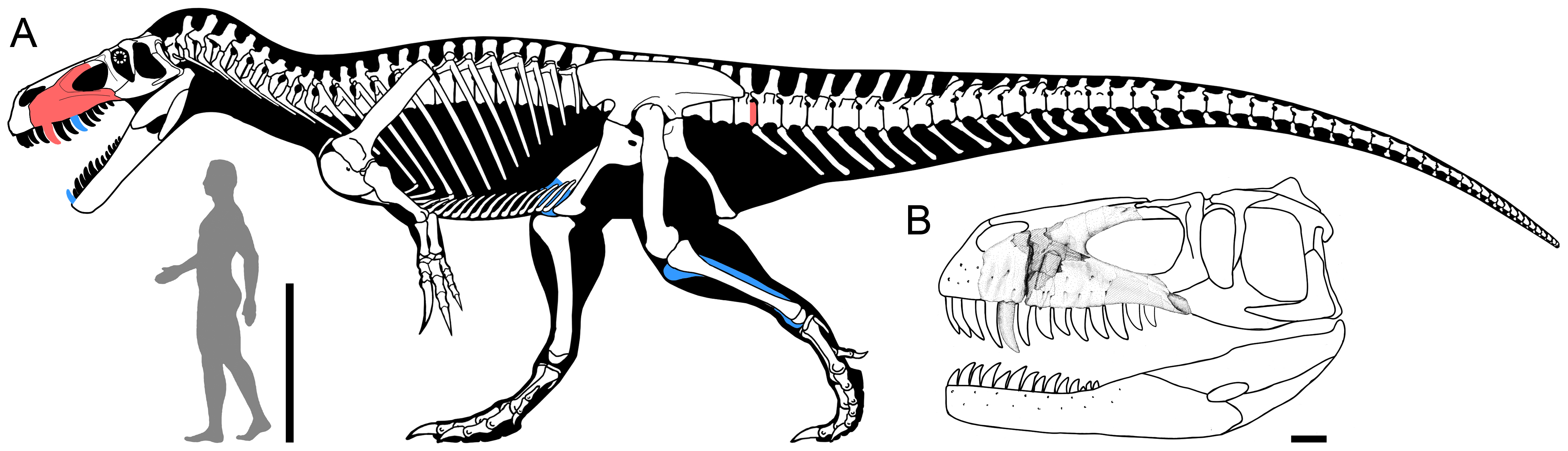
Skeletal restoration showing the size of T. gurneyi, known remains highlighted

== Systematics and classification ==
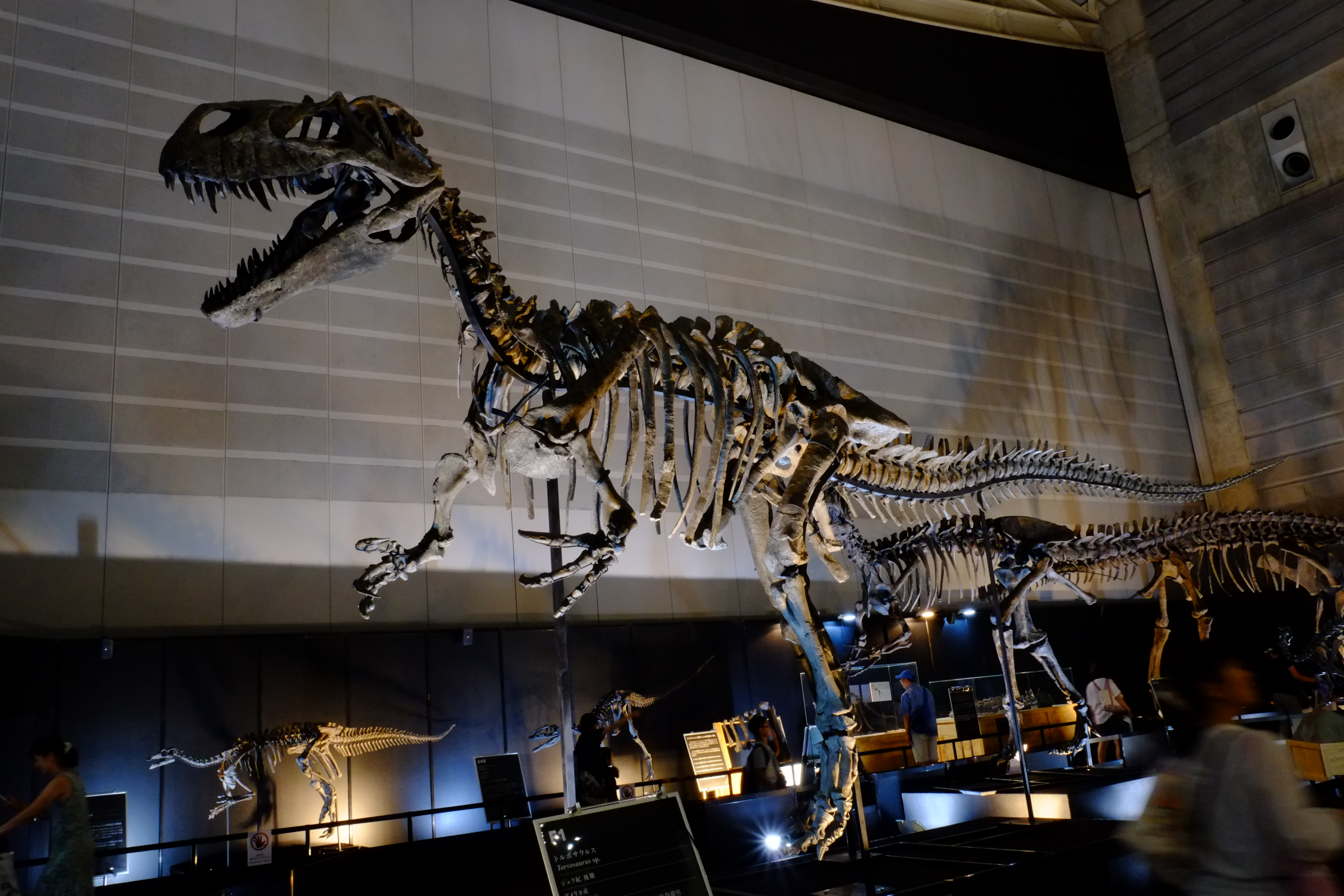
Torvosaurus sp. in Japan

When first described in 1979 by Galton and Jensen, Torvosaurus was classified as a megalosaurid, which is the current consensus. It was later assigned to Carnosauria by Ralph Molnar and colleagues in 1990, then to a basal position in Spinosauroidea by Oliver Walter Mischa Rauhut in 2003, and to a very basal position in Tetanurae by Thomas Holtz in 1994. All these assignments are not supported by present phylogenetic analysis. In 1985, Jensen assigned Torvosaurus to a family of its own, Torvosauridae. Despite support for this concept by Paul Sereno and Mateus, it seems redundant because Torvosaurus is closely related to, and perhaps the sister species of, the earlier Megalosaurus within Megalosaurinae. However, Torvosauridae may be used as an alternative name for Megalosauridae if Megalosaurus is considered an indeterminable nomen dubium. Though a close relative of Megalosaurus, Torvosaurus is seemingly more advanced, or apomorphic. Torvosaurus's larger clade, Megalosauridae, is most commonly held as a basal branch of Tetanurae, considered to be less derived than carnosaurs or coelurosaurs and likely related to the spinosaurids.

The following is a cladogram based on the phylogenetic analysis conducted by Carrano, Benson, and Sampson (2012) showing the relationships of Torvosaurus:

- Megalosauroidea
  - Piatnitzkysauridae
  - Megalosauria
    - Streptospondylus
    - Spinosauridae
    - Megalosauridae
      - Eustreptospondylinae
        - Eustreptospondylus
      - - Megalosaurinae
          - Duriavenator
          - - Megalosaurus
            - Torvosaurus
        - Afrovenatorinae
          - Afrovenator
          - - Dubreuillosaurus
            - Magnosaurus
          - - Leshansaurus
            - Piveteausaurus

=== Distinguishing anatomical features ===
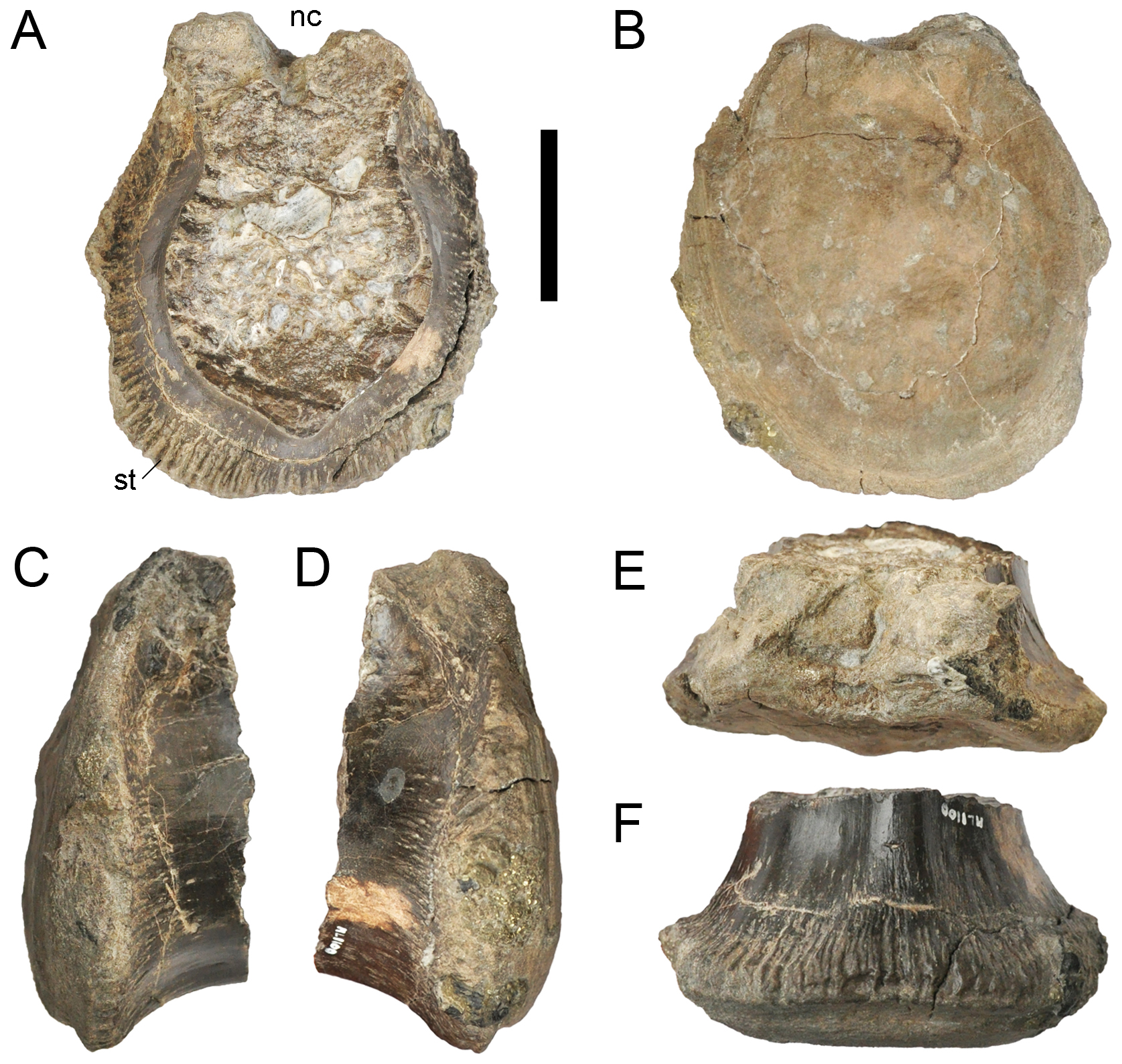
Caudal vertebra of T. gurneyi

According to Warner-Cowgill et al. (2026), Torvosaurus can be distinguished based on the following unique characteristics of the skull:

- The presence of an anteroposteriorly oriented ridge lateral to maxillary fossa
- The presence of a large, subtriangular, mediolaterally shallow maxillary fossa that contacts floor of antorbital fossa
- The maxillary interdental plates are fused into a continuous interdental wall

It can also be distinguished from other megalosaurids based on the following combination of cranial characters:

- The maxillary anterior ramus is much deeper dorsoventrally than jugal ramus
- The antorbital ridge is roughly parabolic in outline anteriorly rather than squared off

Other diagnostic features according to Matthew Carrano and colleagues

- Pronounced rim around the anterior cervical vertebrae
- Highly ossified puboischiadic plate
- Expanded fossae in posterior dorsal and anterior caudal vertebrae centra forming enlarged, deep openings
- Distal expansion of ischium with prominent lateral midline crest and oval outline in lateral view

== Paleobiology ==
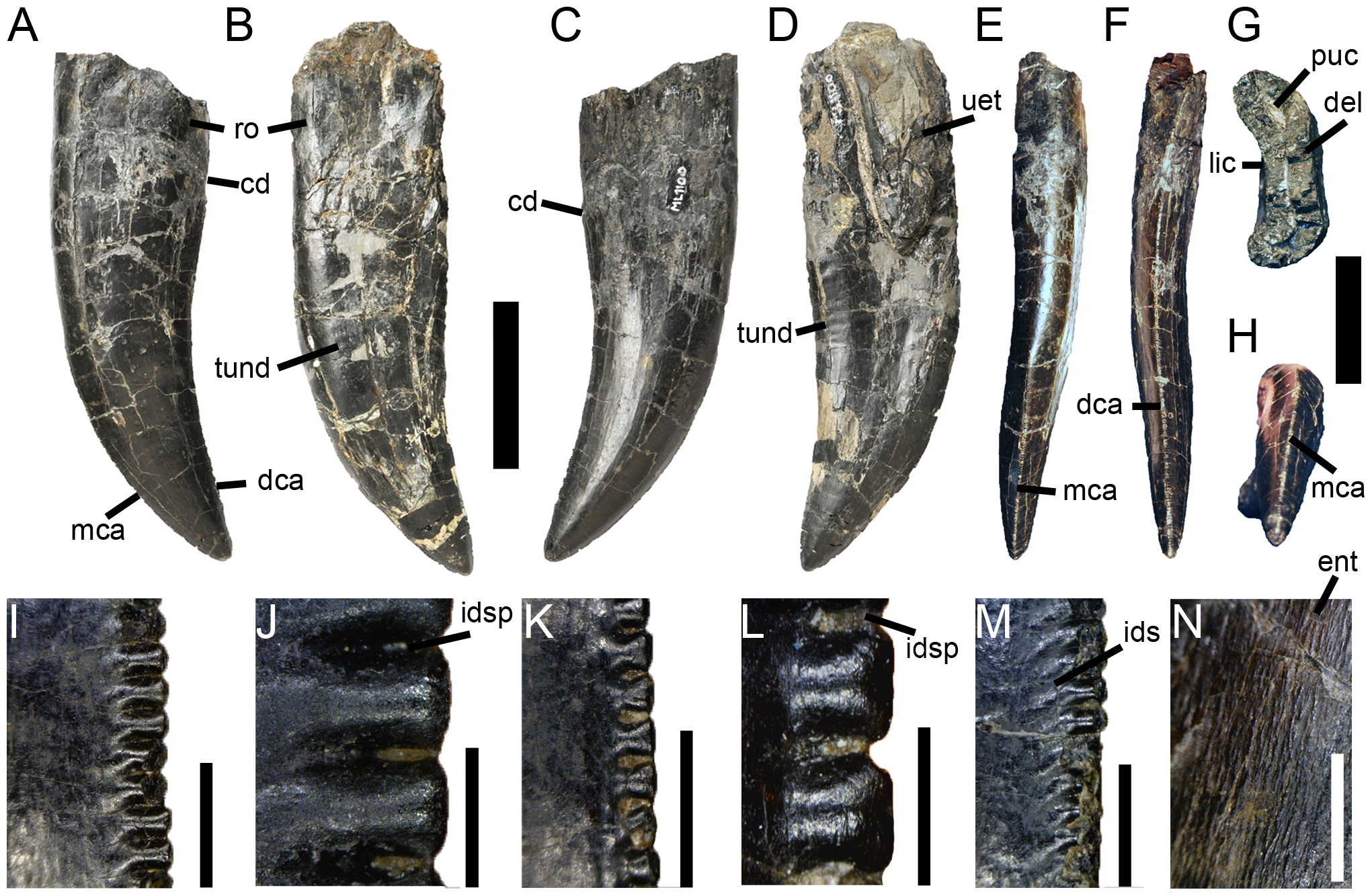
Teeth of Torvosaurus gurneyi.

The study of fossilized embryos of Torvosaurus provides researchers with information about the transformation of the embryo over time, the different developmental pathways present in dinosaur lineages, dinosaur reproductive behavior, and dinosaur parental care. In 2013, Araújo and colleagues announced the discovery of specimen ML1188, a clutch of crushed dinosaur eggs and embryonic material attributed to Torvosaurus. This discovery further supports the hypothesis that large theropods were oviparous, meaning that they laid eggs and hence that embryonic development occurred outside the body of female dinosaurs. This discovery was made in 2005 by the Dutch amateur fossil-hunter Aart Walen at the Lourinhã Formation in Western Portugal in fluvial overbank sediments that are considered to be from the Tithonian age of the Jurassic, approximately 152 to 145 million years ago. This discovery is paleontologically significant for a number of reasons: (a) these are the most primitive dinosaur embryos known; (b) these are the only basal theropod embryos known; (c) fossilized eggs and embryos are rarely found together; (d) it represents the first evidence of a one-layered eggshell for theropod dinosaurs; and (e) it allows researchers to link a new eggshell morphology to the osteology of a particular group of theropod dinosaurs. The specimen is housed at the Museu da Lourinhã in Portugal. As the eggs were abandoned due to unknown circumstances, it is not known if Torvosaurus provided parental care to its eggs and young or abandoned them shortly after laying. However, the eggshells are highly porous, allowing efficient gaseous exchange between the external and internal media, thus indicating the eggs were buried for incubation within substrate in a manner similar to modern seaturtles. This is also corroborated by the undisturbed taphonomic setting and low-energy geological context.

All documented Torvosaurus specimens from the Morrison Formation are from similarly sized, likely adult individuals and the lack of immature individuals may be explained by many factors, none of which are mutually exclusive. For one thing, the formation is known to preserve large vertebrates better than smaller ones. Immature individuals may also have occupied a different ecological niche from adults in habitats where their remains were likely to preserve as fossils and they may have been the prey of choice of larger predators as well. Torvosaurus may also have experienced Type B1 population survivorship, as has been found in other dinosaurs, with mortality increasing after sexual maturity was achieved, leading to an abundance of mature individuals in the fossil record. A final possibility is that immature Torvosaurus remains could be misidentified due to having different proportions compared to the very large and robust adults.

== Paleoenvironment ==
Paleoenvironment and dinosaurs of the Morrison Formation, with T. tanneri chasing Dryosaurus at lower right

=== Provenance and occurrence ===
The type specimen of Torvosaurus tanneri, BYU 2002, was recovered in the Dry Mesa Quarry of the Brushy Basin Member of the Morrison Formation in Montrose County, Colorado. The specimen was collected by James A. Jensen and Kenneth Stadtman in 1972 in medium-grained, coarse sandstone that was deposited during the Tithonian and Kimmeridgian ages of the Jurassic, approximately 153 to 148 million years ago. This specimen is housed in the collection of Brigham Young University in Provo, Utah.

=== Fauna and habitat in North America ===
Studies suggest that the paleoenvironment of this section of the Morrison Formation included rivers that flowed from the west into a basin that contained a giant, saline alkaline lake and there were extensive wetlands in the vicinity. The Dry Mesa Dinosaur Quarry of western Colorado yields one of the most diverse Upper Jurassic vertebrate assemblages in the world. The Dry Mesa Quarry has produced the remains of the sauropods Apatosaurus, Brachiosaurus, Diplodocus, Barosaurus, Supersaurus, and Camarasaurus, the iguanodonts Camptosaurus and Dryosaurus, and the theropods Allosaurus, Tanycolagreus, Koparion, Stokesosaurus, Ceratosaurus, and Ornitholestes, as well as Othnielosaurus, Gargoyleosaurus, and Stegosaurus.

The flora of the period has been revealed by fossils of green algae, fungi, mosses, horsetails, ferns, cycads, ginkgoes, and several families of conifers. Other animal fossils discovered include bivalves, snails, ray-finned fishes, frogs, salamanders, amphibians, turtles, sphenodonts, lizards, terrestrial (like Hoplosuchus) and aquatic crocodylomorphs, cotylosaurs, several species of pterosaurs, like Harpactognathus, and early mammals, such as multituberculates, symmetrodonts, and triconodonts.

=== Fauna and habitat in Europe ===
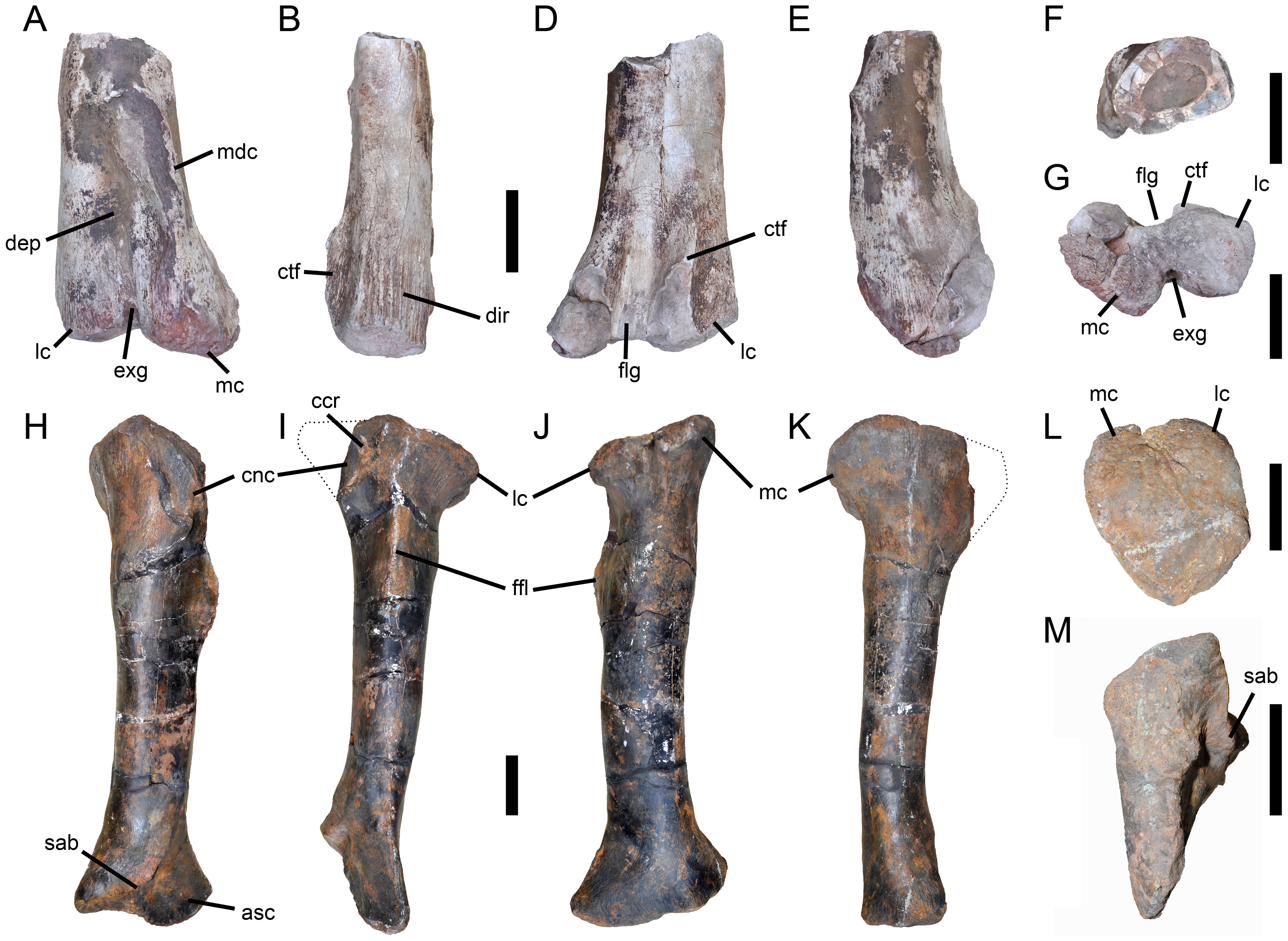
Femur and tibia referred to T. gurneyi

The Ornatenton Formation is a Callovian aged shallow marine deposit, within the formation Torvosaurus was sympatric with the closely related and also large Wiehenvenator. The Lourinhã Formation is Kimmeridgian–Tithonian in age. The environment is coastal and therefore has a strong marine influence. Its flora and fauna are very similar to that of the Morrison. Torvosaurus appears to be the top predator here. It lived alongside the European species of Allosaurus (A. europaeus), Ceratosaurus, Stegosaurus, and presumably Camptosaurus. The theropod Lourinhanosaurus also stalked the area. Lusotitan was the largest sauropod in the region, while the diplodocids Dinheirosaurus and Lourinhasaurus were also present. Dacentrurus and Miragaia were both stegosaurs, while Dracopelta was an ankylosaurian. Draconyx was an iguanodontid related to Camptosaurus. Due to the marine nature of the Lourinhã Formation, sharks, plesiochelyid turtles, and teleosaurid crocodyliforms are also present.

=== Fauna and habitat in Africa ===
The small-scale trough and ripple cross-bedded fine-grained sandstone at the base of the Upper Dinosaur Member of the Tendaguru Formation, of which possible Torvosaurus material is known from, is interpreted as tidal flat deposits. Stagnant water bodies, such as small lakes and ponds, were present and a freshwater depositional environment close to the sea was also probably present.

The possible unnamed Torvosaurus species from the Tendaguru Formation would have shared its habitat with many species of sauropods, such as Australodocus, Dicraeosaurus, Giraffatitan, Janenschia, Tornieria, Wamweracaudia, three unnamed species of diplodocine sauropods, an unnamed species of flagellicaudatan, and the "Archbishop". The theropods it coexisted with were Allosaurus tendagurensis, Ceratosaurus roechlingi, Elaphrosaurus, Labrosaurus stechowi, Ostafrikasaurus, Veterupristisaurus (of which it would have possibly competed with to be top predator), a possible abelisauroid, and an indeterminate megalosauroid, while the ornithischians it coexisted with were Dysalotosaurus and Kentrosaurus. As far as pterosaurs are concerned, it coexisted with Tendaguripterus, an indeterminate archaeopterodactyloid, an indeterminate azhdarchid, two indeterminate dsungaripteroids, an indeterminate rhamphorynchoid, and an indeterminate pterosaur of unknown classification. Due to the coastal environment of the Tendaguru Formation, crocodyliformes, such as Bernissartia, amphibians, including an unnamed lissamphibian, and sharks are also present.

=== Fauna and habitat in South America ===
Within South America, possible Torvosaurus remains are only present within the Tacuarembó Formation of Uruguay. Because the formation was laid down in fluvial to lacustrine sandstones, siltstones, and mudstones, this indicates that the environment of the formation would have been dominated by rivers, streams, and lakes.

If present, Torvosaurus would probably have been the apex predator in the Tacuarembó Formation, although it may have been rivalled by cf. Ceratosaurus. It shared its habitat with two unnamed theropods, an unnamed coelurosaur, an unnamed sauropod known solely from footprints, an unnamed ornithopod also known from footprints, an indeterminate mesoeucrocodylian, an indeterminate turtle species that lived alongside the named turtle species Tacuarembemys kusterae, and the possible pholidosaur Meridiosaurus vallisparadisi. Fish, such as Arganodus tiguidiensis, Asiatoceratodus cf. tiguidensis, Neoceratodus africanus, and Priohybodus arambourgi, and bivalves, such as Diplodon, are also present.

=== Coexistence with other large carnivores ===
Torvosaurus coexisted with other large theropods such as Allosaurus and Ceratosaurus in the United States and Portugal, possibly Veterupristisaurus in Tanzania, and possibly cf. Ceratosaurus (?) in Uruguay. The three, possibly four, species appear to have had different ecological niches, based on anatomy and the location of fossils. Torvosaurus and Ceratosaurus may have preferred to be active around waterways and had lower, more sinuous, bodies that would have given them an advantage in forest and underbrush terrains, whereas Allosaurus had shorter bodies, longer legs, were faster and less maneuverable, and seem to have preferred dry floodplains. Also, Rauhut et al. (2016) proposed that allosaurids and megalosaurids would have had different environmental preferences, the former being more common in inland areas, while the latter being dominant in marine and coastal environments.

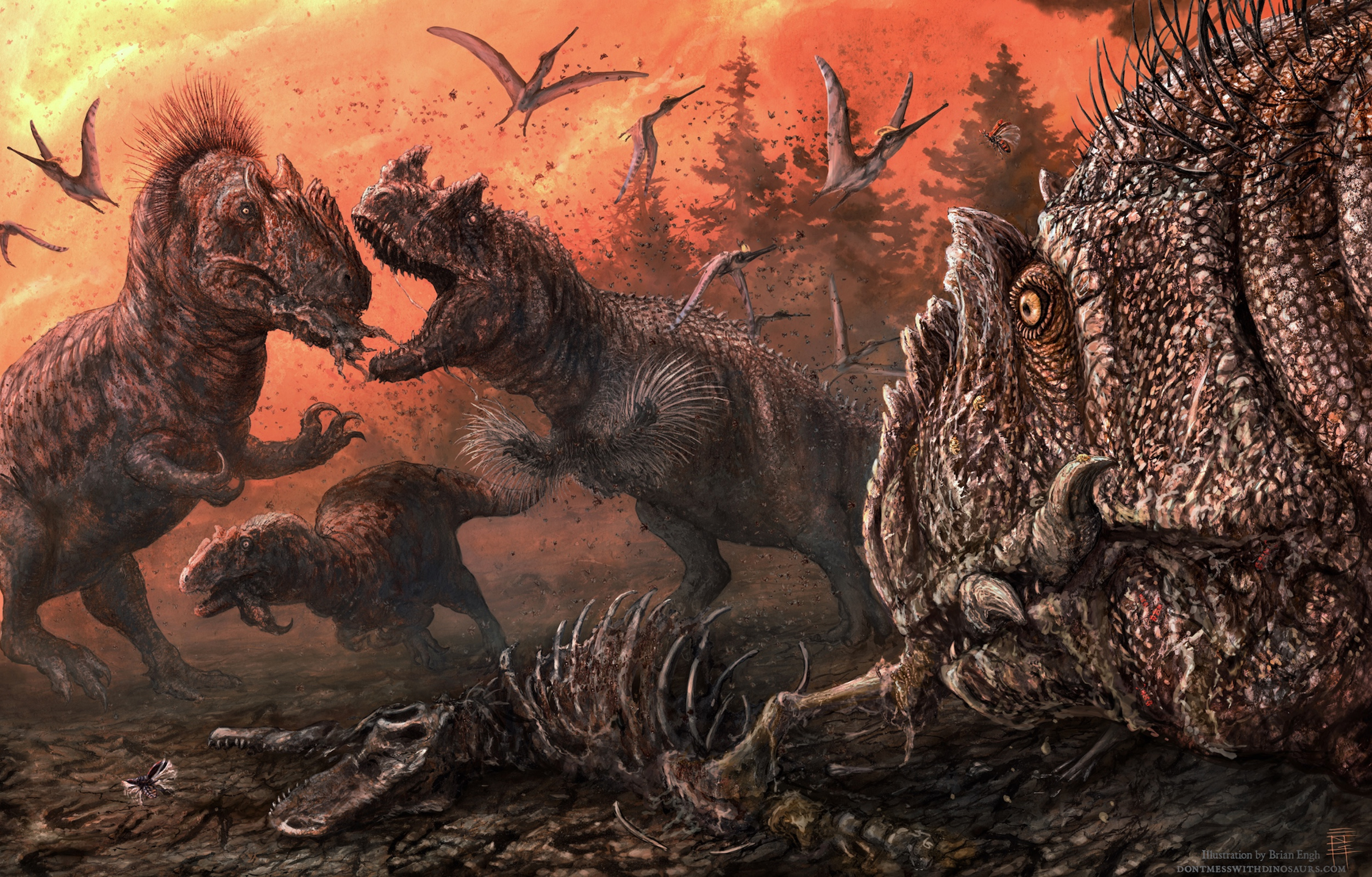
Dry season at the Mygatt-Moore Quarry, showing Ceratosaurus and Allosaurus, two theropods with which Torvosaurus lived, fighting over the desiccated carcass of another theropod

On the other hand, the majority of Torvosaurus remains from the Morrison Formation have been found in localities preserving multiple taxa, including Allosaurus, with Torvosaurus itself being a minor component of the bonebeds. This pattern has been interpreted as indicative of Torvosaurus sharing habitats with other predators, most notably Allosaurus, but at much lower abundances. The three may also have had different dietary preferences, with Allosaurus being more suited for bone slicing (thanks to its short and stout serrated teeth, deep and narrow skull, and powerful dorsoventral movement capacity of the neck), while Ceratosaurus, with its long and blade-like teeth and relatively straight neck, would have probably been incapable of doing so, instead concentrating on the deepest organs of a carcass. While probably capable of some bone consumption, Torvosaurus, with its large skull and teeth and large, powerful, and lithe body may have been specialized in opening up and dismembering exceptionally large sauropod carcasses. This would have allowed smaller theropods, like Allosaurus, better access in a possible commensalism relationship.

Allosaurus was itself a potential food item to other carnivores, as illustrated by an Allosaurus pubic foot marked by the teeth of another theropod, probably Ceratosaurus or Torvosaurus. The location of the bone in the body (along the bottom margin of the torso and partially shielded by the legs) and the fact that it was among the most massive in the skeleton indicates that the Allosaurus was being scavenged.

Bite marks on Allosaurus and Mymoorapelta remains were found among other bones with feeding traces in the Upper Jurassic Mygatt-Moore Quarry. Unlike the others, these have left striations that, when measured to determine denticle width, produced tooth and body size extrapolations greater than any known specimen of Allosaurus or Ceratosaurus, the two large predators known for osteological remains from the quarry. The extrapolations are instead coherent, either with an unusually large specimen of Allosaurus or a separate large taxon like Torvosaurus which is not known from the quarry. The result either increases the known diversity of the site based on ichnological evidence alone or represents powerful evidence of cannibalism in Allosaurus. Based on the position and nutrient value associated with the various skeletal elements with bite marks, it is predicted that while Mymoorapelta was either predated upon or scavenged shortly after death, Allosaurus was scavenged some time after death.
