= Osonachelus =

Osonachelus Temporal range: Bartonian

Scientific classification
- Kingdom: Animalia
- Phylum: Chordata
- Class: Reptilia
- Order: Testudines
- Suborder: Cryptodira
- Family: Cheloniidae
- Genus: †Osonachelus; De Lapparent de Broin et al., 2014

Extinct genus of turtle

Osonachelus is an extinct genus of cheloniid turtle that lived in Catalonia during the Bartonian. It is a monotypic genus known from a single species, O. decorata.
