= Atolchelys =

Atolchelys Temporal range: Barremian

Scientific classification
- Kingdom: Animalia
- Phylum: Chordata
- Class: Reptilia
- Order: Testudines
- Suborder: Pleurodira
- Family: †Bothremydidae
- Genus: †Atolchelys
- Species: †A. lepida

Binomial name
- †Atolchelys lepida Romano et al., 2014

Extinct genus of reptiles

Atolchelys is an extinct genus of bothremydid that lived during the Barremian stage of the Early Cretaceous epoch.

== Distribution ==
A. lepida fossils are known from the Morro do Chaves Formation in the Sergipe-Alagoas Basin of Brazil.
