= Rukwanyoka =

Rukwanyoka Temporal range: Oligocene

Scientific classification
- Kingdom: Animalia
- Phylum: Chordata
- Class: Reptilia
- Order: Squamata
- Suborder: Serpentes
- Family: Boidae
- Genus: †Rukwanyoka; McCartney et al., 2014
- Species: †R. holmani

Binomial name
- †Rukwanyoka holmani McCartney et al., 2014

Extinct genus of reptiles

Rukwanyoka is an extinct genus of boine that inhabited Africa during the Oligocene epoch.

== Taxonomy ==
Rukwanyoka is known from a single species, Rukwanyoka holmani, whose vertebral morphology indicates it was a member of the subfamily Boinae.
