= Pyrenasaurus =

Pyrenasaurus Temporal range: Late Eocene

Scientific classification
- Domain: Eukaryota
- Kingdom: Animalia
- Phylum: Chordata
- Class: Reptilia
- Order: Squamata
- Family: Scincidae (?)
- Genus: †Pyrenasaurus; Bolet and Augé, 2014

Type species
- †Pyrenasaurus evansae Bolet and Augé, 2014

Extinct genus of lizards

Pyrenasaurus is an extinct genus of lizard that includes only one species, the type species Pyrenasaurus evansae, which lived around the Pyrenees mountains during the Late Eocene. P. evansae was named in 2014 on the basis of three dentaries (bones that form the lower jaw), one from the Phosphorites du Quercy in Quercy, France and two from the Sossís fossil locality in Catalonia, Spain. The paucity of known material makes its relationships uncertain; it is either a true skink in the family Scincidae or a close relative of skinks in the larger group Scincoidea. Pyrenasaurus is very small for a lizard, with a dentary length of only 3.4 millimetres (0.13 in). It also has very few teeth for a lizard, with only eleven tooth positions in the dentary. Other unusual anatomical features include the shortness straightness of the jaw, the lack of a Meckelian groove on the inside of the dentary, and the enlargement and lateral compression of the posterior-most dentary teeth. Pyrenasaurus may have been a fossorial or burrowing lizard because a short, straight dentary with few teeth is also present in numerous living fossorial lizards, having evolved independently in many lineages. However, the extremely small size of Pyrenasaurus may have inhibited its ability to burrow. The enlarged posterior teeth of Pyrenasaurus suggest it had a specialized diet, but what it was eating remains unknown because no living lizards have similar dentitions.
