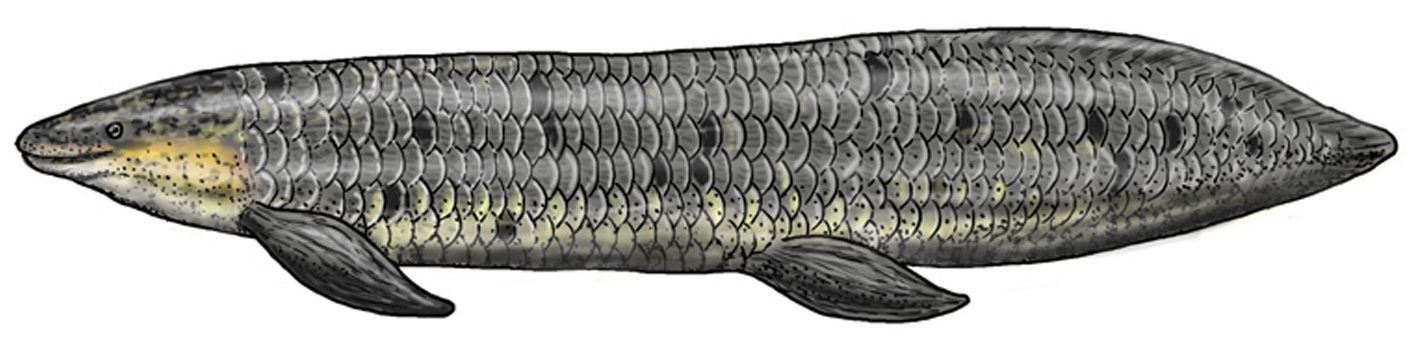
- Life restoration of A. dorotheae

Scientific classification
- Kingdom: Animalia
- Phylum: Chordata
- Class: Dipnoi
- Order: Ceratodontiformes
- Family: †Arganodontidae; Martin, 1982
- Genus: †Arganodus; Martin, 1979

Species
- †A. atlantis Martin, 1979; †A. dorotheae (Case, 1921); †A. multicristatus (Vorobyeva & Minikh, 1968); †A. tiguidiensis (Tabaste, 1963)

= Arganodus =

Arganodus Temporal range: Early Triassic-Early Cretaceous

Extinct genus of fishes

Arganodus is an extinct genus of freshwater lungfish that had a wide global distribution throughout much of the Triassic period, with a single species surviving across Gondwana into the Cretaceous. It is the only member of the family Arganodontidae, although it is sometimes placed in the Ceratodontidae or synonymized with the genus Asiatoceratodus.

It was first named by Martin in 1979 based on fossils found at Tizi n'Maâchou in the Marrakesh area of Morocco, in rocks of the Timezgadiouine Formation belonging to the Argana Group (hence the generic name).

== Taxonomy ==
Arganodus contains the following species:

- †A. atlantis Martin, 1979 - Carnian of Morocco (Timezgadiouine Formation) and Algeria (Zarzaitine Formation) (=Ceratodus arganensis Martin, 1979)
- †A. dorotheae (Case, 1921) - Middle Norian of Texas and New Mexico (Tecovas Formation), late Norian of Arizona (Chinle Formation in Petrified Forest National Park)
- †A. multicristatus (Vorobyeva & Minikh, 1968) - Late Olenekian of European Russia (Yarenskian Gorizont) and Helgoland (Buntsandstein), possibly early Anisian of Poland (Holy Cross Mountains)
- †A. tiguidiensis (Tabaste, 1963) - Late Jurassic of Algeria (Taouratine Group), Morocco (Anoual Formation) & Uruguay (Tacuarembó Formation); Early Cretaceous of Niger (Elrhaz Formation), Algeria (Gara Samani Formation), and Brazil (Alcântara Formation)

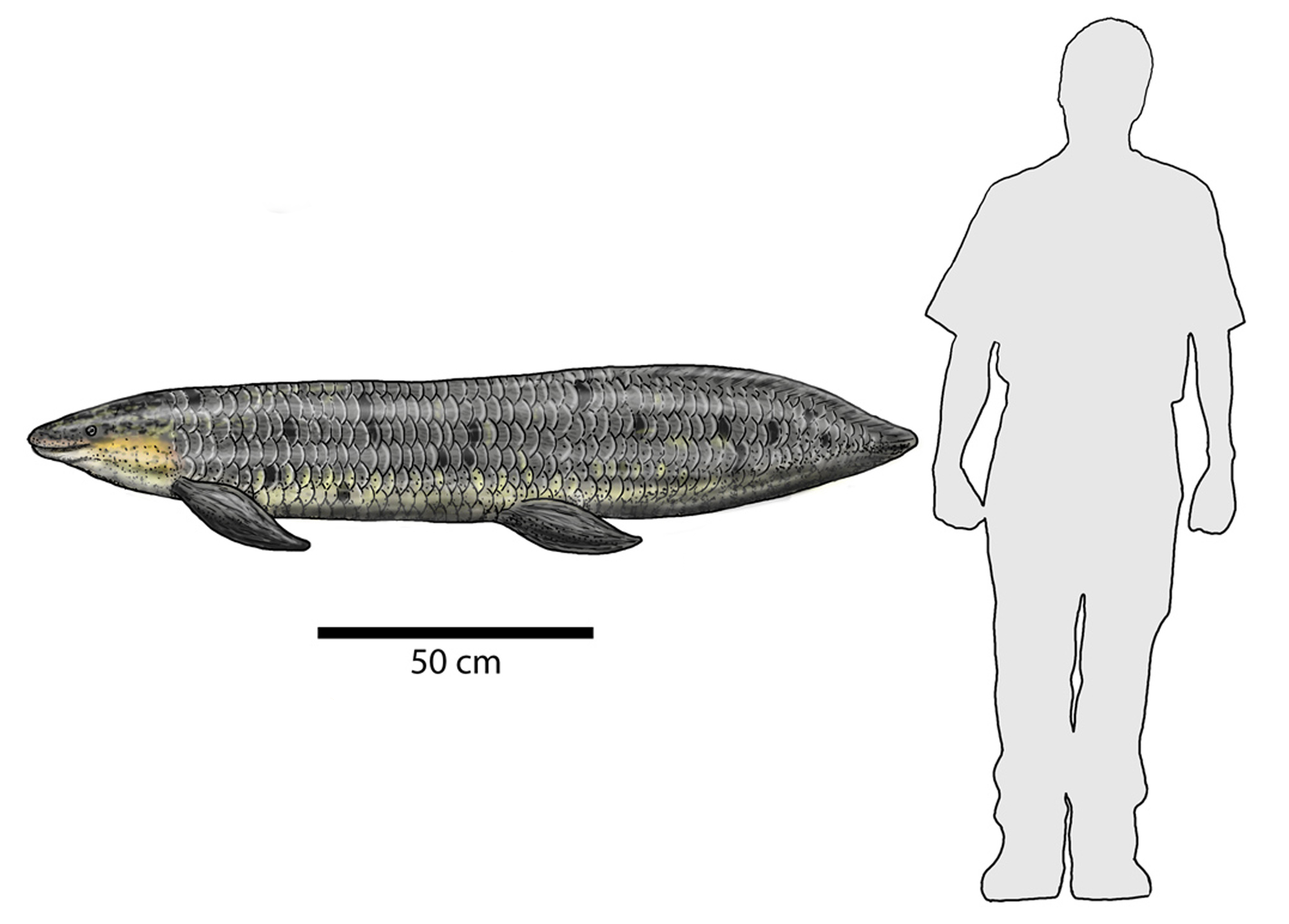
Size comparison of A. dorotheae

Indeterminate specimens have been found in the Redonda Formation, New Mexico and the Cumnock Formation, North Carolina, although the North Carolinian specimens are smaller than most recorded specimens. Other indeterminate remains are also known from the Late Triassic of India and Turkey. Possibly the oldest records of the genus are probable remains from the Induan of northwestern Australia. It has been suggested that shortly after the origin of Arganodus in the early Triassic, it spread into what is now Europe, evolving into A. multicristatus. Before the Late Triassic, it diverged into two vicariant lineages separated by the Central Pangean Mountains: A. atlantis in the east, and A. dorotheae & the Cumnock species in the west, while going extinct in the European region. It eventually went extinct in Laurasia, but one species, A. tiguidensis, managed to survive in Gondwana throughout the Jurassic and Cretaceous.

Kemp (1998) placed Arganodus as a synonym of Asiatoceratodus, and this taxonomy has been followed by many other authors, although others still retain them as different genera and families.

== Paleoecology ==
Arganodus was probably similar to modern lungfish, and lived in underwater burrows during dry periods until monsoons occurred.
