= Tacuarembó Formation =

Geological formation in Uruguay

- Stratigraphic range: Kimmeridgian; ~155–151 Ma
- Type: Geological formation
- Sub-units: Batoví Member
- Overlies: Buena Vista Formation

Lithology
- Primary: Sandstone
- Other: Siltstone, mudstone

Location
- Coordinates: 31.7°S 56.0°W
- Approximate paleocoordinates: 40.2°S 15.7°W
- Region: Tacuarembó Department
- Country: Uruguay
- Extent: Norte Basin

Type section
- Named for: Tacuarembó
- Tacuarembó Formation (Uruguay)

The Tacuarembó Formation is a Late Jurassic (Kimmeridgian) geologic formation of the eponymous department in northern Uruguay. The fluvial to lacustrine sandstones, siltstones and mudstones preserve ichnofossils, turtles, crocodylomorphs, fish and invertebrates (bivalves and gastropods).

== Fossil content ==
The following fossils have been reported from the formation:

Color key: Taxon / Reclassified taxon / Taxon falsely reported as present / Dubious taxon or junior synonym / Ichnotaxon / Ootaxon / Morphotaxon	Notes; Uncertain or tentative taxa are in small text; ~~crossed out~~ taxa are discredited.

=== Dinosaurs ===
==== Theropods ====
Theropods of the Tacuarembó Formation
Genus	Species	Location	Stratigraphic position	Material	Notes	Image
Abelisauridae Indet.	Indeterminate	Tacuarembó Department, Uruguay	Kimmeridgian		A abelisaurid theropod	
Ceratosaurus	C. sp.	Tacuarembó Department, Uruguay	Kimmeridgian		A ceratosaurid ceratosaur	
Coelurosauria Indet.	Indeterminate	Tacuarembó Department, Uruguay	Kimmeridgian		A coelurosaurian theropod	
Theropoda Indet.	Indeterminate	Tacuarembó Department, Uruguay	Kimmeridgian		An indeterminate theropod	
Torvosaurus	T. sp.	Tacuarembó Department, Uruguay	Kimmeridgian		A megalosaurine megalosaurid	

=== Pterosaurs ===
Pterosaurs of the Tacuarembó Formation
Genus	Species	Location	Stratigraphic position	Material	Notes	Image
Tacuadactylus	T. luciae	Tacuarembó Department, Uruguay	Kimmeridgian		A gnathosaurine ctenochasmatid	

=== Crocodylomorphs ===
Crocodylomorphs of the Tacuarembó Formation
Genus	Species	Location	Stratigraphic position	Material	Notes	Image
Meridiosaurus	M. vallisparadisi	Tacuarembó Department, Uruguay	Kimmeridgian		A pholidosaurid mesoeucrocodylian	
Mesoeucrocodylia Indet.	Indeterminate	Tacuarembó Department, Uruguay	Kimmeridgian		An indeterminate mesoeucrocodylian	

=== Turtles ===
Turtles of the Tacuarembó Formation
Genus	Species	Location	Stratigraphic position	Material	Notes	Image
Tacuarembemys	T. kusterae	Tacuarembó Department, Uruguay	Kimmeridgian		An turtle	
Testudines Indet.	Indeterminate	Tacuarembó Department, Uruguay	Kimmeridgian		An turtle	

=== Fish ===
==== Cartilaginous Fish ====
Cartilaginous Fish of the Tacuarembó Formation
Genus	Species	Location	Stratigraphic position	Material	Notes	Image
Priohybodus	P. arambourgi	Tacuarembó Department, Uruguay	Kimmeridgian		A hybodontid shark	

==== Lobe-finned Fish ====
Lobe-finned Fish of the Tacuarembó Formation
Genus	Species	Location	Stratigraphic position	Material	Notes	Image
Arganodus	A. tiguidiensis	Tacuarembó Department, Uruguay	Kimmeridgian		A arganodontid lungfish	
Asiatoceratodus	A. tiguidiensis	Tacuarembó Department, Uruguay	Kimmeridgian		A asiatoceratodontid lungfish	
Mawsonia	M. gigas	Tacuarembó Department, Uruguay	Kimmeridgian		A mawsoniid coelacanth	
Neoceratodus	N. africanus	Tacuarembó Department, Uruguay	Kimmeridgian		A neoceratodontid lungfish	

==== Ray-finned Fish ====
Ray-finned Fish of the Tacuarembó Formation
Genus	Species	Location	Stratigraphic position	Material	Notes	Image
Halecostomi Indet.	Indeterminate	Tacuarembó Department, Uruguay	Kimmeridgian		An fish	
Semionotiformes Indet.	Indeterminate	Tacuarembó Department, Uruguay	Kimmeridgian		A semionotiform fish	

=== Mollusks ===
==== Bivalves ====
Bivalves of the Tacuarembó Formation
Genus	Species	Location	Stratigraphic position	Material	Notes	Image
Diplodon	D. sp.	Tacuarembó Department, Uruguay	Kimmeridgian		A hyriid mussel	
Tacuaremboia	T. caorsii	Tacuarembó Department, Uruguay	Kimmeridgian		A bivalve	

==== Gastropods ====
Gastropods of the Tacuarembó Formation
Genus	Species	Location	Stratigraphic position	Material	Notes	Image
Viviparidae Indet.	Indeterminate	Tacuarembó Department, Uruguay	Kimmeridgian			

=== Ichnofossils ===
Ichnofossils of the Tacuarembó Formation
Genus	Species	Location	Stratigraphic position	Material	Notes	Image
Ornithopoda Indet.	Indeterminate	Tacuarembó Department, Uruguay	Kimmeridgian			
Sauropoda Indet.	Indeterminate	Tacuarembó Department, Uruguay	Kimmeridgian			
Theropoda Indet.	Indeteminate	Tacuarembó Department, Uruguay	Kimmeridgian			

== See also ==
- List of fossiliferous stratigraphic units in Uruguay
