= Asiatoceratodus =

Asiatoceratodus Temporal range: Middle Triassic-early Late Cretaceous

Scientific classification
- Kingdom: Animalia
- Phylum: Chordata
- Clade: Sarcopterygii
- Class: Dipnoi
- Order: Ceratodontiformes
- Family: †Asiatoceratodontidae
- Genus: †Asiatoceratodus; Vorobyeva, 1967

Type species
- †Asiatoceratodus sharovi Vorobyeva, 1967

Other species
- †A. tiguidiensis

Extinct genus of fishes

Asiatoceratodus is an extinct genus of lungfish which lived during the Middle-Late Triassic, Jurassic and Cretaceous periods in what is now Asia (Kyrgyzstan), Africa (Ethiopia, Niger, Algeria, Morocco) and South America (Uruguay and Brazil).

== Species ==
=== Asiatoceratodus sharovi ===
Complete skeletons of Asiatoceratodus sharovi first described by Vorobyeva (1967) from the Middle-Late Triassic deposits of Fergana valley in Kyrgyzstan. This species is characterizes by toothed plates with 4 to 5 crests.

=== Asiatoceratodus tiguidiensis ===
Another species originally was described from the Late Jurassic site of Algeria as Ceratodus tiguidiensis Later, C. tiguidiensis was assigned to Arganodus by M. Martin (1984) and reassigned by Kemp (1998) to the genus Asiatoceratodus. Despite this, some authors uses Arganodus tiguidiensis in their articles. A. tiguidiensis was also found in the Late Jurassic (Kimmeridgian) Tacuarembo Formation of Uruguay, the northwestern Ethiopian plateau of latest Jurassic (Tithonian) age, the Cretaceous Elrhaz Formation of Niger, the Early Late Cretaceous assemblage of Southeastern Morocco and the Cenomanian Alcântara Formation of Brazil.
