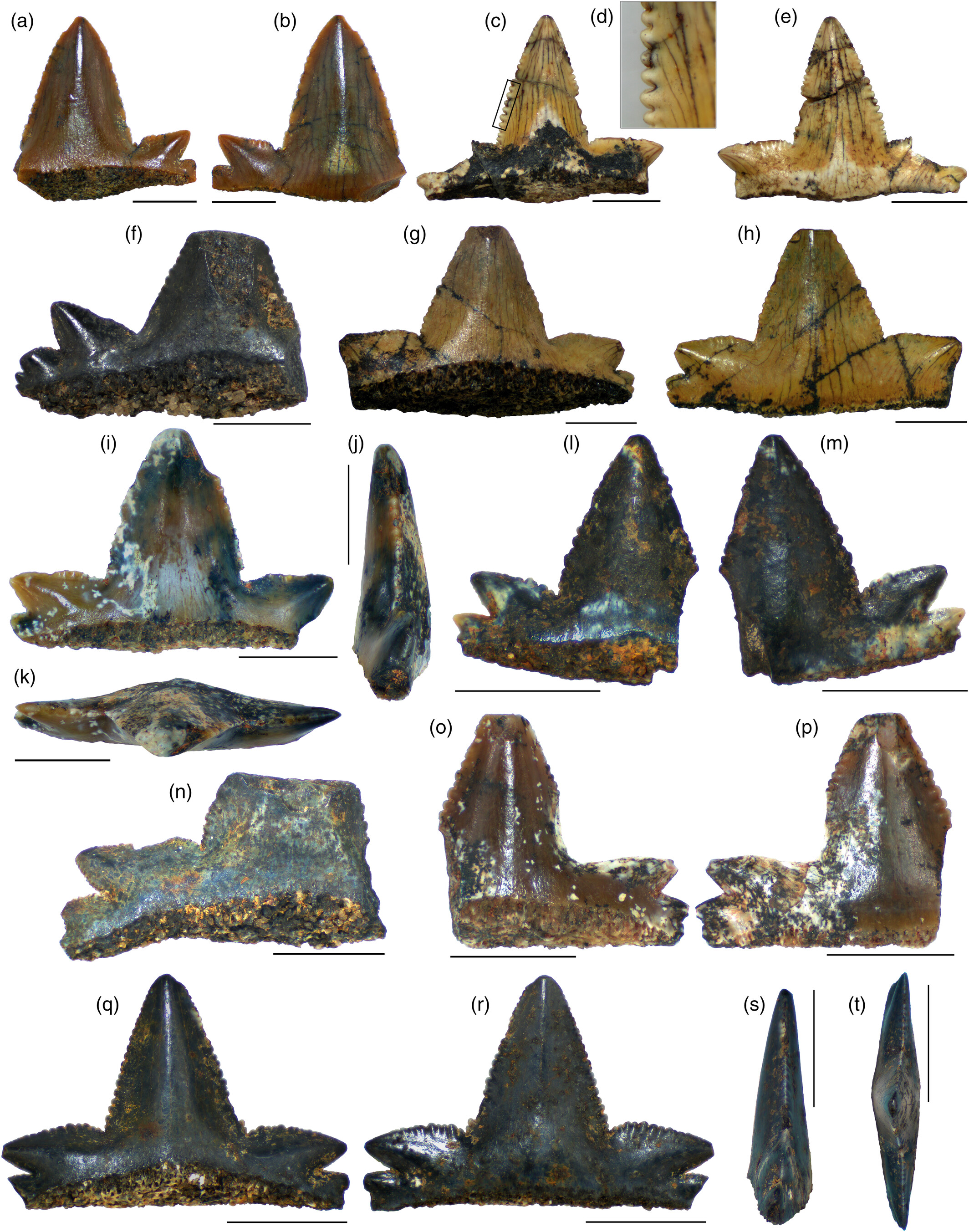

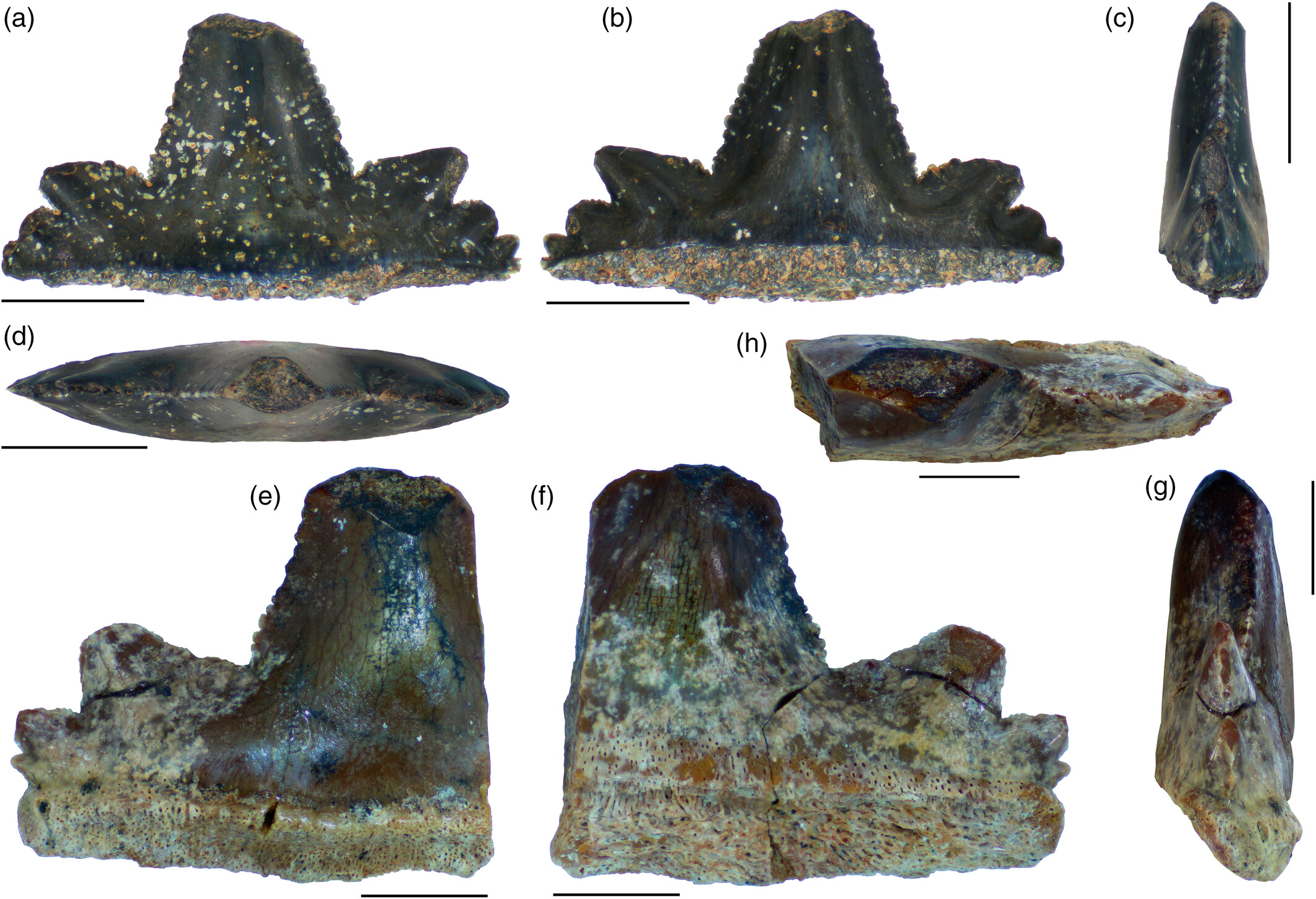
- Teeth of Priohybodus arambourgi from the Aliança Formation of Brazil (Upper Jurassic)

Scientific classification
- Kingdom: Animalia
- Phylum: Chordata
- Class: Chondrichthyes
- Order: †Hybodontiformes
- Family: †Hybodontidae
- Genus: †Priohybodus; Erasmo, 1960

Type species
- Planohybodus arambourgi Erasmo, 1960

= Priohybodus =

Priohybodus Temporal range: Late Jurassic - Early Cretaceous Late Jurassic–Early Cretaceous

Extinct genus of hybodont shark

Priohybodus is an extinct genus of hybodont shark that lived in Sahara Africa, the Arabian Peninsula and South America during the Late Jurassic and Early Cretaceous periods. This genus contains a singular species, P. arambourgi. It can grow up to 2 to 4 meters in length (based on tooth size) and preyed primarily on fish and large vertebrates grasping and cutting their prey.

It has been taxonomically grouped with Secarodus and Planohybodus into an informally named group Priohybodontines.

The genus was first described by Erasmo in 1960 based on fragmented and isolated tooth crowns discovered in a Late Jurassic formation in Somalia. The discovery of fossil material from the Early Cretaceous of southern Tunisia and the Late Jurassic Lugh series of Somalia greatly exspanded its geographic range. In Ethiopia, there are remains of a partially complete crown probably dated to the Tithonian age.

== Distribution ==
Like many members of Hybodontiformes, this genus had a wide palaeogeographic distribution across Gondwana being known from deposits in Saharan Africa and the Arabian Peninsula (Yemen). In Somalia it is known from the Late Jurassic period in the Conca di El Mao and Gerdes el Abid (Lugh series) formations. In Ethiopia, it is known from the Late Jurassic Mugher Mudstone. The Late Jurassic of northern Yemen and Uruguay have remains from the Amran and Tacuarembó formations respectively with 22 isolated teeth and a dorsal fin spine being discovered. Lastly for the Late Jurassic, it is known from the Aliança Formation in Brazil. In the Early Cretaceous of Tunsinia, remains have been found in the Douiret Formation.

== Description ==
It has fully serrated cutting edges on its teeth and was the first hybodontiform shark known to develop this. The teeth of this genus shows a high range of morphological plasticity.
