= Tacuarembemys =

Tacuarembemys Temporal range: Late Jurassic, ~155–151 Ma

Scientific classification
- Kingdom: Animalia
- Phylum: Chordata
- Class: Reptilia
- Clade: Pantestudines
- Clade: Testudinata
- Order: Testudines
- Genus: †Tacuarembemys; Perea et al., 2014
- Species: †T. kusterae

Binomial name
- †Tacuarembemys kusterae Perea et al., 2014

Extinct genus of turtles

Tacuarembemys ("Tacuarembó turtle") is an extinct genus of continental turtle from South America. It contains a single species, T. kusterae. The genus was described based on the external mold of a carapace and associated shell bone fragments found near the city of Tacuarembó, Uruguay. This fossil was found on the Tacuarembó Formation, whose estimated age ranges from late Jurassic to earliest Cretaceous.

It is the first turtle to be discovered in South American continental deposits of that age, and shows a unique combination of traits (shared and derived), who allows the recognition of this fossil as a new genus. Despite that, more remains are needed to clarify its phylogenetic relationships. The estimated length of carapace is 18 cm.

The histology of its plates, a shell that is dorsoventrally low, and the paleoenvironment proposed for the Tacuarembó Formation (permanent and temporary streams and lakes), support the ecology of this genus as semiaquatic and mainly aquatic turtles.
