= Uruguay (trace fossil) =

Scientific classification
- Ichnofamily: †Celliformidae
- Ichnogenus: †Uruguay; Roselli 1939

Type species
- †Uruguay auroranormai

Synonyms
- Rosellia Francis, 1975; Urugauaichnus Roselli, 1976; Urugauichnus Schlüter, 1984

Ichnogenus of insect trace fossils

Uruguay is a trace fossil which was described in 1939 by Francisco Lucas Roselli. Consisting of bee cells, can be found in the Asencio Formation of Uruguay.
