= Palmiraichnus =

Scientific classification
- Ichnofamily: †Celliformidae
- Ichnogenus: †Palmiraichnus; Roselli 1987

Type species
- †Palmiraichnus castellanosi

Ichnogenus of insect trace fossils

Palmiraichnus is a trace fossil, described by Francisco Lucas Roselli in 1987. First registered in the Paleogene of Uruguay, they were also found in the Quaternary of the Canary Islands: Lanzarote in the Holocene, Fuerteventura in the Upper Pleistocene, Gran Canaria and Montaña Clara during the Middle Pleistocene.
