= Celliforma =

Celliforma Temporal range: Cenozoic

Scientific classification
- Ichnofamily: †Celliformidae
- Ichnogenus: †Celliforma; R.W.Br. 1934

Type species
- †Celliforma spirifer

Ichnogenus of insect trace fossils

Celliforma is a trace fossil, described by Roland Wilbur Brown in 1934 and representing the fossil larval chambers of mining bees.

It can be described as a flask- to capsule-shaped cells with smooth exterior walls, when weathered out of the outcrop. When still in the matrix, the interior of the cell is also smooth when well preserved. May contain fossilized pollen and spores. Some cells contain a spiral cap. Cells are arranged in a series of architectural morphologies that include radiating from a central shaft in various configurations.
