= Keppens =

Keppens is a Flemish surname. Notable people with the surname include:

- Nicolas Keppens (born 1989), Belgian film director
- Raymond Keppens, Belgian field hockey player and Olympic medalist
- Veerle Keppens, Belgian and American physicist
