= Veerle Keppens =

Belgian-American physicist

Veerle M. Keppens is a Belgian and American condensed matter physicist and materials scientist whose research concerns the elasticity and physical acoustics of materials, including the use of resonant ultrasound spectroscopy, and the study of high entropy oxides. She is Chancellor's Professor in the Department of Materials Science and Engineering at the University of Tennessee, and the university's vice provost for faculty affairs.

== Education and career ==
Keppens was a student at KU Leuven, where she received a bachelor's degree in 1989 and completed her Ph.D. in 1995. Her dissertation was Materials Physics and Physical Acoustics; elastic properties and lattice dynamics of novel materials.

She did postdoctoral research as a Fulbright Fellow at Oak Ridge National Laboratory in Tennessee from 1995 to 1998, and then in 1999 became an assistant professor of physics at the University of Mississippi. In 2003 she moved to the University of Tennessee. She became an associate professor in 2007, full professor in 2012, and Chancellor's Professor in 2019. She was associate dean from 2012 to 2016 and department head beginning in 2015 before taking her present administrative position as vice provost.

== Recognition ==
Keppens was elected as a Fellow of the Acoustical Society of America in 2011, "for the application of ultrasonics to condensed matter physics".
