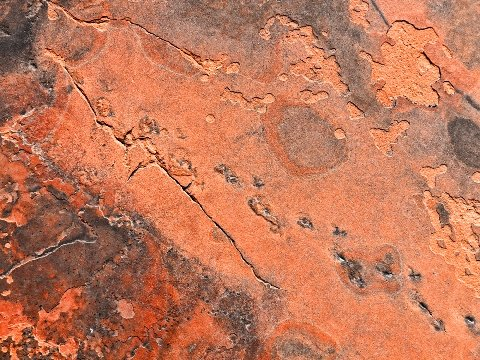
- Octopodichnus trackway at Red Rock Canyon, Nevada, US

Trace fossil classification
- Domain: Eukaryota
- Kingdom: Animalia
- Phylum: Arthropoda
- Subphylum: Chelicerata
- Class: Arachnida
- Ichnogenus: Octopodichnus; Gilmore 1927

Ichnospecies
- O. didactylus Gilmore 1927; O. minor Brady 1947; O. raymondi Alf 1968

= Octopodichnus =

Octopodichnus Temporal range: Permian–Jurassic

Ichnogenus of trace fossil

Octopodichnus (‘eight-footed trace’) is a Permian to Jurassic trace fossil that has been found in the western United States.

The ichnogenus is characterized by alternating groups of four tracks. These are interpreted as tracks of spiders or scorpions.
