= Ornithotarnocia =

Trace fossil classification
- Domain: Eukaryota
- Kingdom: Animalia
- Phylum: Chordata
- Class: Aves
- Ichnofamily: †Avipedidae
- Ichnogenus: †Ornithotarnocia; Kordos, 1985

Trace fossil

Ornithotarnocia is a Mesozoic bird ichnogenus. It is similar to the ichnogenus Aquatilavipes, but has a thicker digit III impression and is more asymmetrical.
