= Ancorichnus =

Trace fossil

Ancorichnus is an ichnogenus. Ancorichnus, is distinguished by structured mantle peripheral to a meniscate core. The mantle is not considered as a wall structure since it formed by the locomotive behaviour of the burrow producer. This ichnotaxon occurs in full relief at the top of grainstone beds 10 and 12. It is a non-branched, cylindrical, horizontal burrow with a diameter of 0.2-0.3 cm and 0.3-0.4 cm, respectively.

== See also ==
- Ichnology
