= Francisco Lucas Roselli =

Uruguayan paleontologist and naturalist

- Born: Francisco Lucas Roselli; October 18, 1902; Carmelo, Uruguay
- Died: November 22, 1987 (aged 85)
- Scientific career
- Fields: Paleontology
- Author abbrev. (zoology): Roselli

Francisco Lucas Roselli (Carmelo, 18 October 1902 - 22 November 1987) was a Uruguayan palaeontologist and archaeologist, mainly active in Colonia Department.

== Selected works ==
- 1938: Apuntes de geologia y paleontologia uruguayas y sobre insectos del Cretáceo del Uruguay o descubrimientos de admirables instintos constructivos de esa época. Boletin de la Sociedad Amigos de la Ciencias naturales “Kraglievich-Fontana, 1, 29–102.
- 1976: Contribución al estudio de la geopaleontología: departamentos de Colonia y Soriano (República Oriental del Uruguay).
- 1976: Fiandraia romeii. Un nuevo interesante notoungulado (Typotheria-Mammalia) de edad Friasense, de Nueva Palmira, Uruguay.
- 1987: Paleoicnología: nidos de insectos fósiles de la cobertura Mesozoica del Uruguay. Publicaciones del Museo Municipal de Nueva Palmira, 1(1), 1-56.

Roselli was an honorary member of the Instituto Histórico y Geográfico del Uruguay.

He helped establish the Municipal Museum of Nueva Palmira with his whole collection. After passing away, in 1989 the museum was given his name.
