= Mesetasaurus =

Mesetasaurus Temporal range: Upper Cretaceous

Scientific classification
- Kingdom: Animalia
- Phylum: Chordata
- Class: Reptilia
- Clade: Dinosauria
- Clade: Saurischia
- Clade: †Sauropodomorpha
- Clade: †Sauropoda
- Clade: †Macronaria
- Clade: †Titanosauria
- Clade: †Lithostrotia
- Clade: †Aeolosaurini
- Genus: †Mesetasaurus
- Species: †M. protector

Binomial name
- †Mesetasaurus protector Soto Núñez et al., 2026

Genus of titanosaurian sauropod dinosaurs

Mesetasaurus (lit. 'Meseta de Artigas lizard') is a genus of aeolosaurin titanosaurian sauropod dinosaurs known from the Guichón Formation (Late Cretaceous, potentially Coniacian to Maastrichtian) of Paysandú Department, Uruguay. The genus contains a single species, the type species Mesetasaurus protector, known from two well-preserved caudal vertebrae. It is the second titanosaurian taxon known from its unit and the second non-avian dinosaur described from Uruguay, after the saltasauroid Udelartitan.

== Discovery and naming ==
The Mesetasaurus holotype material consists of two caudal vertebrae, probably corresponding to the third and sixth positions; they were found in the 1980s. They are stored in the Vertebrate Fossil Collection of the Universidad de la República in Montevideo, Uruguay, where they are permanently accessioned under the code FC-DPV 3740. Soto Núñez et al. (2026) further distinguish the more anterior (toward the front) vertebra as 3740A and the more posterior (toward the back) one as 3740B.

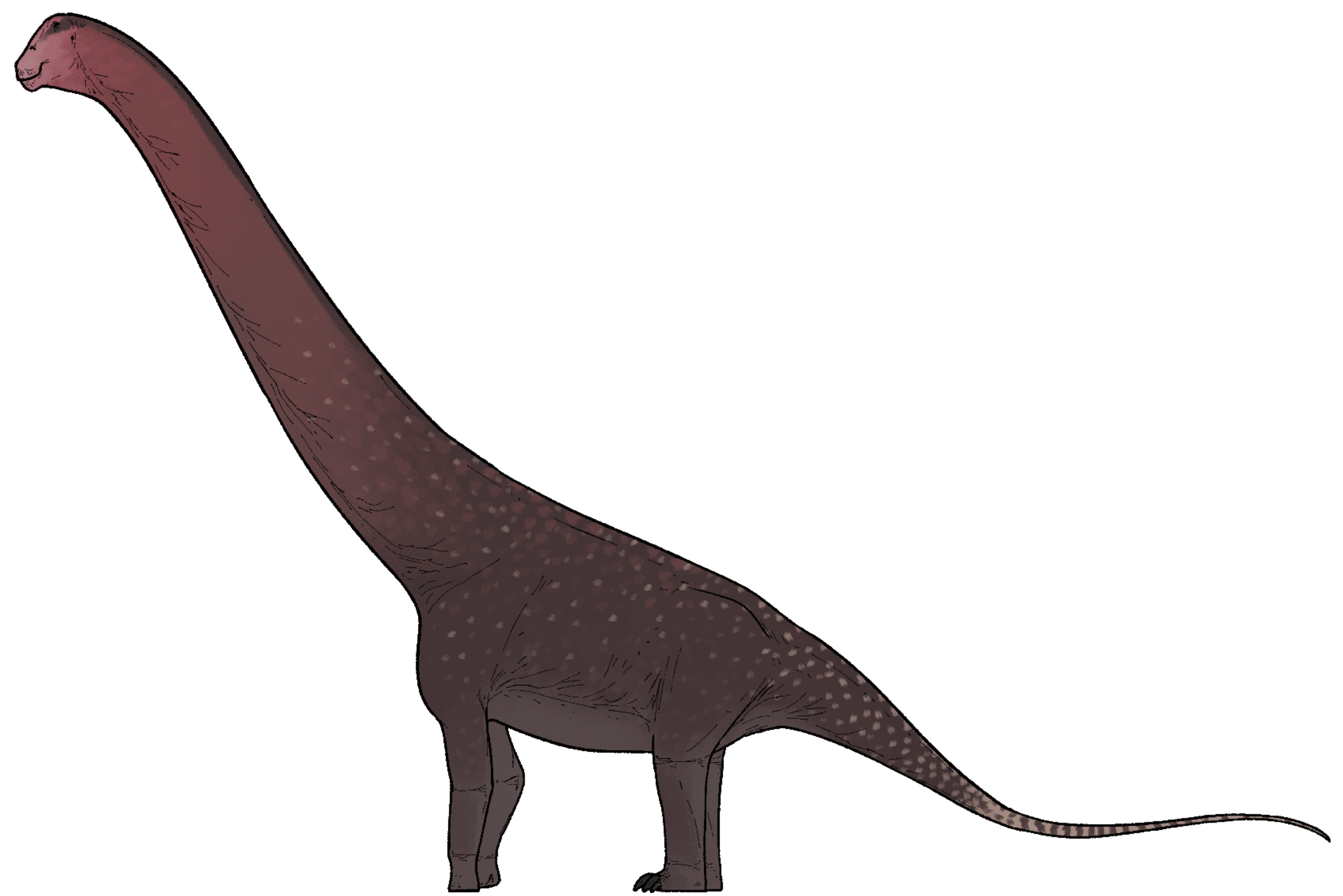
Hypothetical life reconstruction

They were described as belonging to a new genus and species of titanosaurian dinosaur in 2026. The generic name, Mesetasaurus, refers to the locality where the fossils were found, Meseta de Artigas. The specific name, protector, refers to Uruguayan hero José Gervasio Artigas, also known as 'Protector de los Pueblos Libres'; a bust of him is present close to the fossil locality.

== Classification ==
To determine the relationships of Mesetasaurus, Soto Núñez et al. (2026) entered it into the phylogenetic analysis of Pérez Moreno et al. (2026). This analysis placed Mesetasaurus in the clade Aeolosaurini, which is split into two smaller clades (named 'Clade A' and 'Clade B' by the authors). A cladogram adapted from their analysis is shown below:

- Aeolosaurini
  - Gondwanatitan faustoi
  - Inawentu oslatus
  - - Clade A
      - Baurutitan britoi
      - Bravasaurus arreirosorum
      - Caieiria allocaudata
    - Clade B
      - Overosaurus paradasorum
      - - Mesetasaurus protector
        - - Aeolosaurus rionegrinus
          - - Arrudatitan maximus
            - Punatitan coughlini

== Palaeoenvironment ==
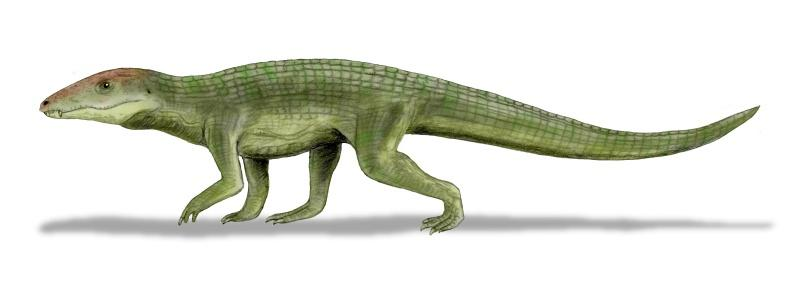
Life restoration of the contemporary Uruguaysuchus

Mesetasaurus and its contemporary Udelartitan are known from the Late Cretaceous Guichón Formation of Uruguay. The exact age of this formation is uncertain. Some authors have historically suggested a Lower Cretaceous (Aptian–Albian) age due to similarities with the Migues Formation. However, the overlying Mercedes Formation dates to the Campanian–Maastrichtian ages of the Upper Cretaceous, so this would introduce a significant gap in time. The discovery of dinosaur eggshells in the formation similar to Sphaerovum prompted later researchers to favor a Late Cretaceous age for the Guichón Formation. The describers of Mesetasaurus suggested that the formation could be further dated to the Coniacian to Maastrichtian stages, as that is when other aeolosaurins are known to have lived.

Other fossils from the Guichón Formation include several specimens of Uruguaysuchus—a crocodyliform closely related to Araripesuchus—as well as the teeth of indeterminate iguanodontians and theropods. The younger Asencio Formation of Uruguay also contains titanosaur specimens, including the centrum of a caudal vertebra referred to Aeolosaurus sp.
