= Ulaanoosh Formation =

Geologic formation in Mongolia

- Stratigraphic range: Albian-Cenomanian; ~113–94 Ma
- Type: Geological formation
- Underlies: Bayan Shireh Formation
- Overlies: Khukhteeg Formation

Lithology
- Primary: Sandstone, mudstone
- Other: Conglomerate

Location
- Coordinates: 44.5°N 104.7°E
- Approximate paleocoordinates: 47.6°N 95.5°E
- Region: Ömnögovi Province
- Country: Mongolia
- Ulaanoosh Formation (Mongolia)

The Ulaanoosh Formation, formerly Baruunbayan Formation, is a geologic formation in the Ömnögovi Province of southern Mongolia. The formation dates to the Albian to Cenomanian stages of the Cretaceous. The Ulaanoosh Formation has provided fossils of dinosaurs, turtles and dinosaur eggs assigned to Parafaveoloolithus sp.. In 2020, the neoceratopsian Beg tse was described from the alluvial sandstones, mudstones and conglomerates of the formation.

== Description ==
The Ulaanoosh Formation was formerly considered to be the Baruunbayan Formation (or Baruunbayan Svita in Russian or Mongolian), first documented by the Soviet-Mongolian Paleontological Expeditions between 1946 and 1949. These beds are now considered to be part of the Ulaanoosh Formation. Shuvalov (1982) recognized the red beds at Baruunbayan based on exposures near mountains adjacent to the towns of Baruunbayan and Zuunbayan. Later, the Baruunbayan Svita was more thoroughly studied during a large geological mapping project carried out in the same area by a variety of studies. Due to insufficient representation (only partial sections are exposed at these localities), Badamgarav et al. in 1995 proposed that the Ulaanoosh Formation represents a complete section of red beds in the Baruunbayan area based on drill logs. The Ulaanoosh Formation is distributed in the areas of Ulaanoosh, Alguu Ulaan Tsav, Baruunbayan, and Zuunbayan. The age of the Ulaanoosh Formation ranges from late Early to early Late Cretaceous (Albian-Cenomanian) based on vertebrate and invertebrate fossils such as dinosaurs, dinosaur eggs, molluscs, ostracods, and turtles.

The Ulaanoosh Formation is composed of two members: a lower and an upper. The lower member (Aptian to Albian) comprises white-colored mudstones, fine-grained conglomerates, bright gray colored, carbonate-rich sandstones, yellowish fine-grained sandstones with carbonate concretions and gray colored conglomerates preserving invertebrate fossils. The upper member is largely composed of reddish colored, fine to medium grained mudstones, fine-medium grained conglomerates, and a breccia layer in the base. The upper member of the formation preserved fragmentary sauropods and dinosaur eggs Faveoloolithus.

=== Age ===
Absolute ages and stratigraphic correlation among many Gobi Desert localities are difficult to investigate and hindered by a lack of detailed geological mapping and sediments suitable for radiometric dating. The rock matrix embedding Beg is similar to sediments of the lowest upper member of Ulaanoosh Formation in being composed of reddish-brown conglomerate-breccia and sandstones. This suggests the age of this specimen can be constrained between 113~94 Ma, most likely at the boundary between Early and Late Cretaceous (~100.5 Ma).

== Fossil content ==
The following fossils have been reported from the formation:

Group	Taxa	Images	Notes
Neoceratopsia	Beg tse		
Saurischia	Macronaria indet.		
Saurischia	Sauropoda indet.		
Turtles	Nanhsiungchelyidae indet.		
Faveoloolithidae	Parafaveoloolithus sp.		

== See also ==
- List of dinosaur-bearing rock formations
- Alagteeg Formation
- Khuren Dukh Formation
