= Puerto Yeruá Formation =

Geologic formation in Argentina

- Stratigraphic range: Late Cretaceous
- Type: Geological formation

Lithology
- Primary: Sandstone, claystone
- Other: Conglomerate

Location
- Coordinates: 32.2°S 58.1°W
- Approximate paleocoordinates: 37.0°S 38.7°W
- Region: Entre Ríos Province
- Country: Argentina
- Extent: Paraná Basin

Type section
- Named for: Puerto Yeruá, Concordia Department
- Puerto Yeruá Formation (Argentina)

The Puerto Yeruá Formation is a Late Cretaceous geologic formation in the Paraná Basin, pertaining to Entre Ríos Province, Argentina. Dinosaur remains are among the fossils that have been recovered from the formation, as well as egg fragments and fossilized wood.

== Description ==
The formation comprises red claystones and grey sandstones, medium-thick, well silicified, partly conglomeratic, whitish and reddish color thanks to the presence of iron oxides and frequently calcareous cement. It was deposited in a lacustrine to floodplain humid environment with seasonal rainfall. Fossils of cf. Sphaerovum erbeni (Faveoloolithidae), Theropoda indet., and Ankylosauria indet. are reported from the formation. The formation has been correlated with the Guichón Formation of eastern Uruguay.

== Paleofauna ==
- Argyrosaurus superbus (lithostrotia indet.)
- Paraperseoxylon septatum

== Trace fossils ==
- Elipsoideichnus meyeri

== See also ==
- List of dinosaur-bearing rock formations
  - List of stratigraphic units with few dinosaur genera
- Guichón Formation
