= Charrua (disambiguation) =

The Charrua are an indigenous people of South America living in Argentina, Brazil, and Uruguay.

Charrua or Charrúa may also refer to:

== Language ==
- Charrúa language
- Charrúan languages, the language family including Charrúa

== Places ==
- Charrua, Rio Grande do Sul, Brazil
- Charrúa Gap, Livingston Island
- Charrúa Ridge, Livingston Island
- Los Charrúas, Entre Ríos Province, Argentina

== Sports ==
- Charrua Rugby Clube, in Porto Alegre, Rio Grande do Sul, Brazil
- Estadio Charrúa, in Carrasco, Montevideo, Uruguay

== Other ==
- Charrua (nautical), a kind of sailing ship
