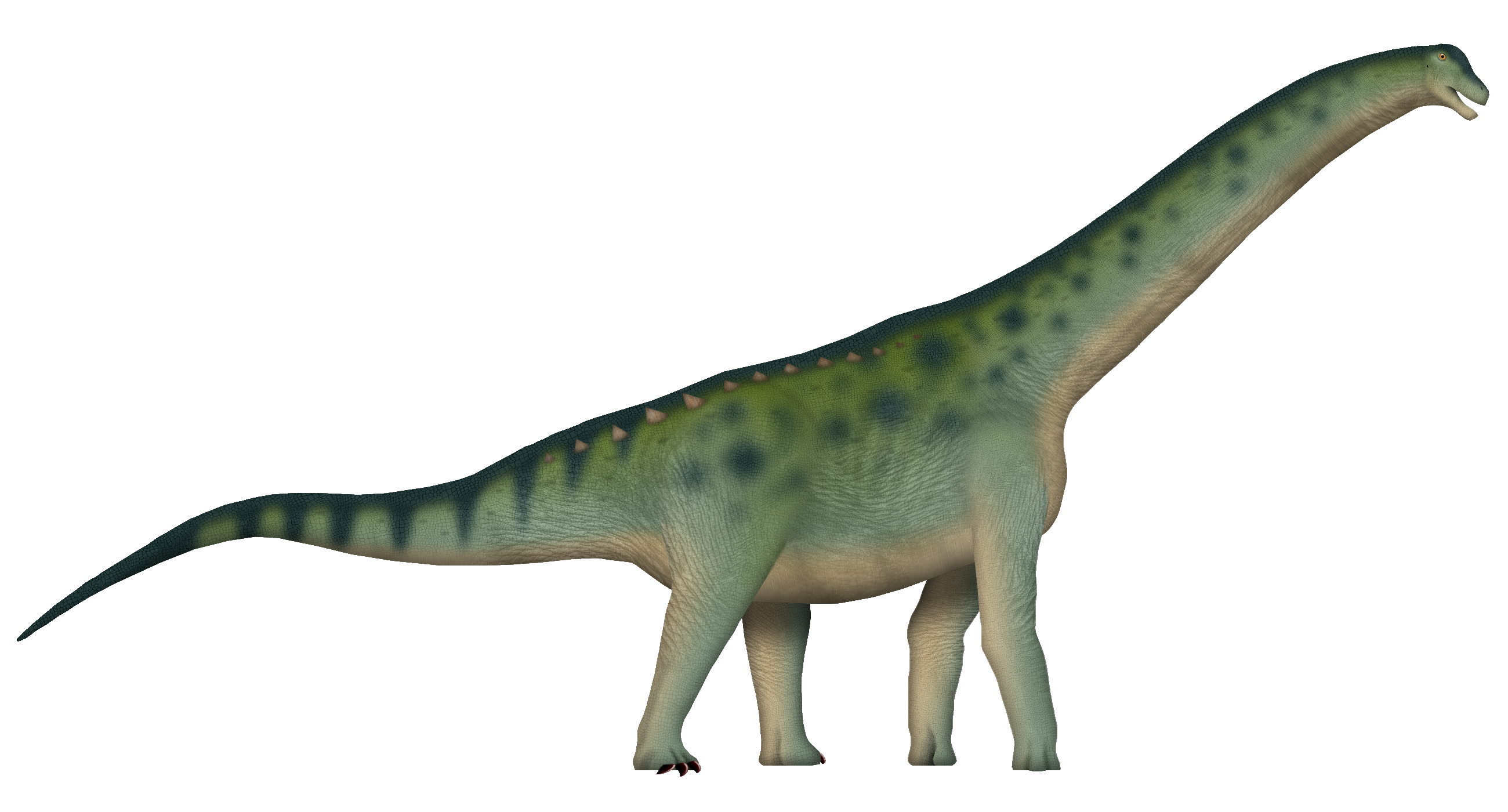
- Hypothetical life restoration

Scientific classification
- Kingdom: Animalia
- Phylum: Chordata
- Class: Reptilia
- Clade: Dinosauria
- Clade: Saurischia
- Clade: †Sauropodomorpha
- Clade: †Sauropoda
- Clade: †Macronaria
- Clade: †Titanosauria
- Superfamily: †Saltasauroidea
- Family: †incertae sedis
- Genus: †Udelartitan
- Species: †U. celeste

Binomial name
- †Udelartitan celeste Soto et al., 2024

= Udelartitan =

Udelartitan Temporal range: Upper Cretaceous

Genus of titanosaurian sauropod dinosaurs

Udelartitan is an extinct genus of saltasauroid titanosaurian sauropod dinosaur from the Late Cretaceous Guichón Formation of Uruguay. The genus contains a single species, U. celeste, known from fragmentary remains of at least two individuals.

== Discovery and naming ==
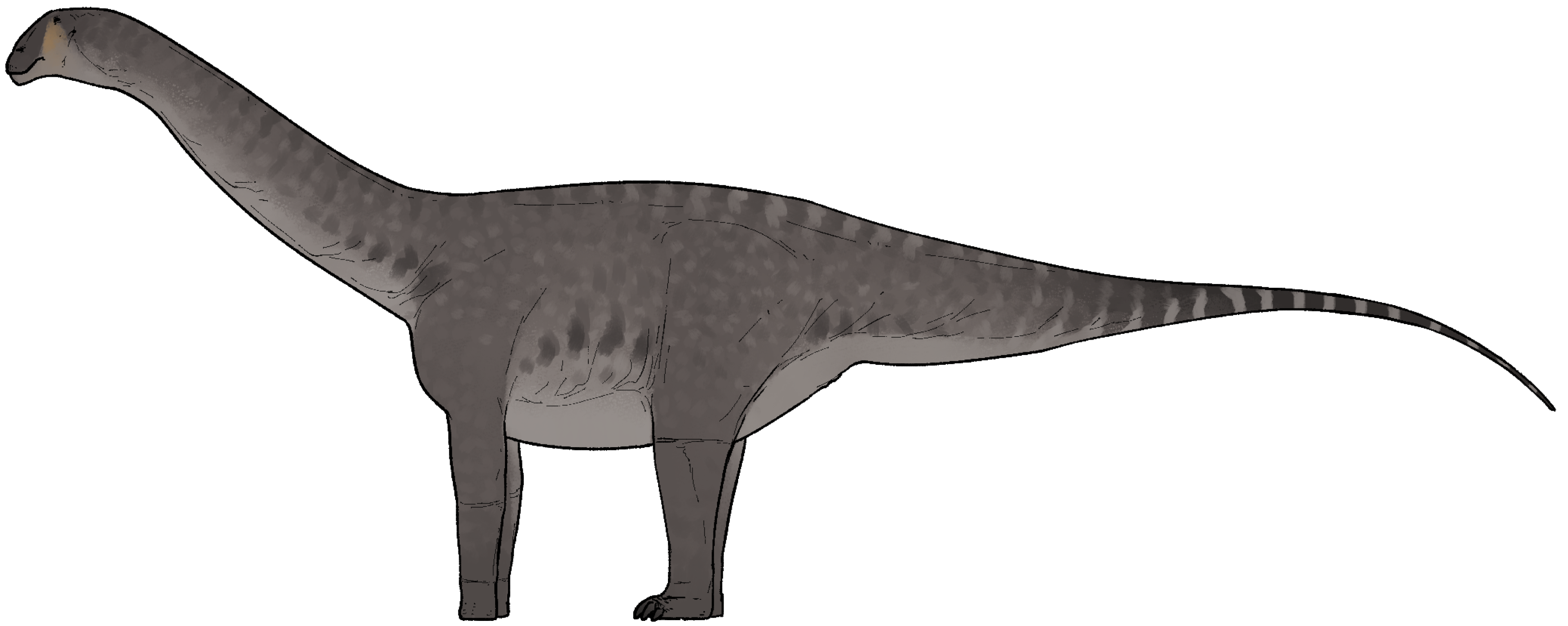
Life restoration

The Udelartitan fossil material was discovered in 2006 within sediments of the Guichón Formation (Araújo locality), near Quebracho in Paysandú Department, Uruguay. The holotype specimen, FC-DPV 3595, consists of the first three caudal vertebrae in approximate articulation. Additional bones representing an older individual (specimen FC-DPV 1900), including sixty caudal vertebrae, an incomplete left coracoid, the proximal and distal ends of the tibiae the proximal end of the fibula, six metatarsals, and two astragali, were also referred to Udelartitan. Many of the bones of the referred specimen were preliminarily described by Soto, Perea & Cambiaso in 2012, who also identified several purported osteoderms. However, Soto et al. (2024) found no evidence to support this assessment, arguing that they can more confidently be described as concretions.

In 2024, Soto et al. described Udelartitan celeste as a new genus and species of titanosaur sauropod based on these fossil remains. The generic name, Udelartitan, combines "UdelaR", an acronym for the Universidad de la República (whose collection of vertebrae fossils includes those assigned to Udelartitan), with the word "titan", a common suffix for giant sauropod names, referencing the pre-Olympian gods of Greek mythology. The specific name, celeste, is a Spanish word for sky blue, referencing the nickname given to some Uruguayan athletic teams.

== Description ==
Based on other titanosaurs known from more complete skeletons, Soto et al. (2024) suggest that Udelartitan was about 15–16 metres (49–52 ft) in body length.

== Classification ==
In their preliminary description of some of the Udelartitan fossil material in 2012, Soto, Perea & Cambiaso used the general morphology of the caudal vertebrae and astragalus to suggest that it likely belonged to a derived lithostrotian titanosaur—likely a non-saltasaurine saltasaurid—related to Pellegrinisaurus, Baurutitan, and Alamosaurus. They further cautioned that the Saltasauridae clade has historically had a very variable composition, comprising either very few or many species, depending on the analyses performed.

In 2024, Soto et al. used phylogenetic analyses to find the most likely position for Udelartitan within the Titanosauria. Similar to the previous work, they found support for a position within the Saltasauroidea. They used two data-matrices to assess the phylogenetic position of Udelartitan, and recovered it either as a non-saltasaurid saltasauroid or a basal saltasaurine. Their results are displayed in the cladograms below:

Topology 1: Cerda et al. (2021) dataset

- Eutitanosauria
  - Colossosauria
    - Rinconsauria
    - - Bonitasaura
      - - Lognkosauria
  - Saltasauroidea
    - Dreadnoughtus
    - - - Uberabatitan
        - Baurutitan
        - Rapetosaurus
        - Tapuiasaurus
      - - Udelartitan
        - Pellegrinisaurus
        - - Alamosaurus
          - Saltasauridae
            - Opisthocoelicaudia
            - - Neuquensaurus
              - Saltasaurus

Topology 2: Navarro et al. (2022) dataset

- Eutitanosauria
  - Colossosauria
  - - Bonitasaura
    - - - Lognkosauria
        - - - Puertasaurus
            - Notocolossus
          - - Rinconsauria
            - - Punatitan
              - Aeolosaurini
      - - Dreadnoughtus
        - - Diamantinasauria
          - - - Isisaurus
              - Rapetosaurus
            - - Tapuiasaurus
              - Saltasauridae
                - - Opisthocoelicaudia
                  - Nemegtosaurus
                - Saltasaurinae
                  - Udelartitan
                  - - Alamosaurus
                    - - - Ibirania
                        - - Bonatitan
                          - Rocasaurus
                      - - Neuquensaurus
                        - - Saltasaurus
                          - MACN PV RN 233 (Angostura Colorada Formation saltasaurine)

== Palaeoenvironment ==
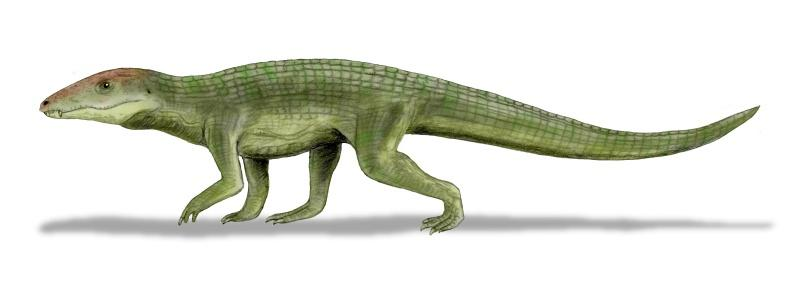
Life restoration of the contemporary Uruguaysuchus

Udelartitan is known from the Late Cretaceous Guichón Formation of Uruguay. The exact age of this formation is uncertain. Some authors have historically suggested a Lower Cretaceous (Aptian–Albian) age due to similarities with the Migues Formation. However, the overlying Mercedes Formation dates to the Campanian–Maastrichtian ages of the Upper Cretaceous, so this would introduce a significant gap in time. The discovery of dinosaur eggshells in the formation similar to Sphaerovum prompted later researchers to favor a Late Cretaceous age for the Guichón Formation.

Other fossils from the Guichón Formation include several specimens of Uruguaysuchus—a crocodyliform closely related to Araripesuchus—as well as the teeth of indeterminate iguanodontians and theropods. The younger Asencio Formation of Uruguay also contains titanosaur specimens, including the centrum of a caudal vertebra referred to Aeolosaurus sp.
