= Cellicalichnus =

Scientific classification
- Ichnofamily: †Celliformidae
- Ichnogenus: †Cellicalichnus; Genise, 2020

Type species
- †Cellicalichnus krausei

Ichnogenus of insect trace fossils

Cellicalichnus is trace fossil, described by Jorge Fernando Genise in 2020. It was found along with wasp trace fossils and new beetle trace fossils in the Castillo Formation of Patagonia, and it represents typical Halictini nests composed of sessile cells that are attached to main tunnels. According to geological, paleosol, paleobotanical, and ichnological data, bees, and angiosperms cohabited in an inland and dry environment comparable to an open dry woodland or savanna, under warm-temperate and semiarid-subhumid climate, in the Southern Hemisphere by the Albian.
