= Sphaerovum =

Sphaerovum Temporal range: Campanian-Maastrichtian

Egg fossil classification
- Basic shell type: †Dinosauroid-spherulitic
- Oofamily: †Faveoloolithidae
- Oogenus: †Sphaerovum; Mones, 1980

Oospecies
- †S. erbeni Mones, 1980 (type)

Dinosaur egg

Sphaerovum is an oogenus of dinosaur egg that has only been discovered in South America.

== History ==
Sphaerovum was first described, along with Tacuarembovum, in 1980 by paleontologist Álvaro Mones, following their discovery at the Asencio Formation in Uruguay. This was one of the first discoveries of fossil dinosaur eggs in South America.

== Distribution ==
Fossils of Sphaerovum and Sphaerovum-like eggs are known from the Puerto Yeruá, Allen and Colorado Formations in Argentina and the Guichón and Asencio Formations of Uruguay. They are always found in Campanian- or Maastrichtian-aged rocks, leading to their use as index fossils.

== Description ==
Sphaerovum eggs are 15-20 cm in diameter, with a shell between 4.2 and 5.5 mm thick. The ornamentation is compactituberculate, i.e. the eggshell is covered with dome-like nodes formed by the tops of the shell units. The type specimen of Sphaerovum erbeni is too silicified to make out its microstructure, however many specimens of South American fossil eggs showing superficial similarities to Sphaerovum have been found. These specimens are resemble other Faveoloolithids in their filispherulitic structure and a multicanaliculate pore system. Unlike Faveoloolithids, however, Sphaerovum has compactituberculate ornamentation more similar to Megaloolithids. The high density of pores on the eggshell surface suggests that these eggs were laid in a humid environment.

At the Mercedes Formation, Sphaerovum-like eggs were found in large, closely packed groups indicating that they were buried in a shallow pit.

== Classification ==
Due to their poor preservation, classification of Sphaerovum has proven difficult.

=== Parataxonomy ===
The holotype specimen of Sphaerovum is heavily silicified, making the eggshell structure unrecognizable and assignment to any oofamily difficult. However, other specimens which have strong superficial resemblance to Sphaerovum have been found in Uruguay and Argentina. These specimens show morphology similar to members of Faveoloolithidae, supporting the referral of Sphaerovum to that oofamily. However, it is occasionally considered to be a Megaloolithid on the basis of its ornamentation.

=== Parentage ===
It is unknown what kind of dinosaur laid Sphaerovum eggs because embryonic remains have not been found. However, they have long been considered to be the eggs of titanosaurs. This would be consistent with the fact that titanosaurs were extremely common in the Upper Cretaceous of South America. Also, some eggshell fragments tentatively assigned to Sphaerovum were found loosely associated with the remains of a Saltasaurid titanosaur at the Guichón Formation in Uruguay.

== See also ==
- List of dinosaur oogenera
