= Estancia Grande =

Estancia Grande may refer to:

- Estancia Grande, Entre Ríos, a village and municipality
- Estancia Grande, San Luis, a village and municipality in Coronel Pringles Department, San Luis
