= San José Formation =

San Jose or San José Formation may refer to:

- San Jose Formation, Eocene geologic formation of Colorado and New Mexico
- San José Formation, Argentina, Miocene geologic formation of Argentina
- San José Formation, Peru, Ordovician geologic formation of Peru
- San José Formation, Uruguay, Mio-Pliocene geologic formation of Uruguay
