= 21st century in ichnology =

Study of trace fossils

The 21st century in ichnology refers to advances made between the year 2000 to now in the scientific study of trace fossils, the preserved record of the behavior and physiological processes of ancient life forms, especially fossil footprints.

== 2000s ==
=== 2000 ===
- The ichnofamily Celliformidae was described by Juan Fernando Genise.
- As part of this family, Genise & Verde described Corimbatichnus, a cluster of fossil bee cells from the Uruguayan Late Cretaceous‐Early Tertiary Asencio Formation.

=== 2002 ===
- Epibaion, described by Ivantsov, is a trace fossil imprint of the Ediacaran animals of the phylum Proarticulata, which became extinct in the Precambrian. Imprints often occur in chains, which is interpreted as a feeding trace; some chains terminate in a body fossil, allowing their maker to be identified.

=== 2006 ===
- In the Czech Republic, Mikuláš et al. described Brutalichnus, of which there is evidence of biting and gnawing traces on reptilian and mammalian bones.

=== 2008 ===
- Augerinoichnus was found in New Mexico, US., unusual in being found in a tidal flat environment.

== 2010s ==
=== 2013 ===
- Ivantsov described Kimberichnus, an ichnofossil associated with the early bilaterian Kimberella, known mostly from shallow marine Ediacaran sediments, often occurring in Russia and South Australia, where it is most abundant in the shape of multiple arcuate sets of ridges with fan-shaped arrangements.

=== 2014 ===
- Anoigmaichnus, an ichnogenus of bioclaustrations, was described by Olev Vinn et al.; it occurs in the Middle Ordovician bryozoans of Osmussaar Island, Estonia.

== 2020s ==
=== 2020 ===
- 100-million-year-old sweat bee nests, representing the oldest evidence of crown bees reported so far, (Cellicalichnus) are described from the Castillo Formation (Argentina) by Genise et al. (2020).
- 567-million-year-old fossils from the Ediacaran period found, showing earliest evidence of sperm and egg sexual reproduction found in the MacKenzie Mountains in Canada (2026)

== See also ==
- History of paleontology
  - Timeline of paleontology
- Timeline of ichnology
  - 20th century in ichnology
