= Corimbatichnus =

Corimbatichnus Temporal range: Late Cretaceous – Early Tertiary

Scientific classification
- Ichnofamily: †Celliformidae
- Ichnogenus: †Corimbatichnus; Genise & Verde, 2000

Type species
- †Corimbatichnus fernandezi

Ichnogenus of insect trace fossils

Corimbatichnus is trace fossil from the Uruguayan Late Cretaceous‐Early Tertiary Asencio Formation, described by Jorge Fernando Genise and Mariano Verde in 2000. The cells have rough inner surfaces, closed with loose material.
