= Celliformidae =

Trace fossil classification
- Ichnofamily: †Celliformidae; Genise, 2000

Ichnogenera
- Celliforma; Cellicalichnus; Corimbatichnus; Elipsoideichnus; Palmiraichnus; Rosellichnus; Uruguay

Ichnofamily of insect trace fossils

Celliformidae is an ichnofamily attributed to bee cells, one of the most common traces in paleosols. It was described by Genise in 2000.
