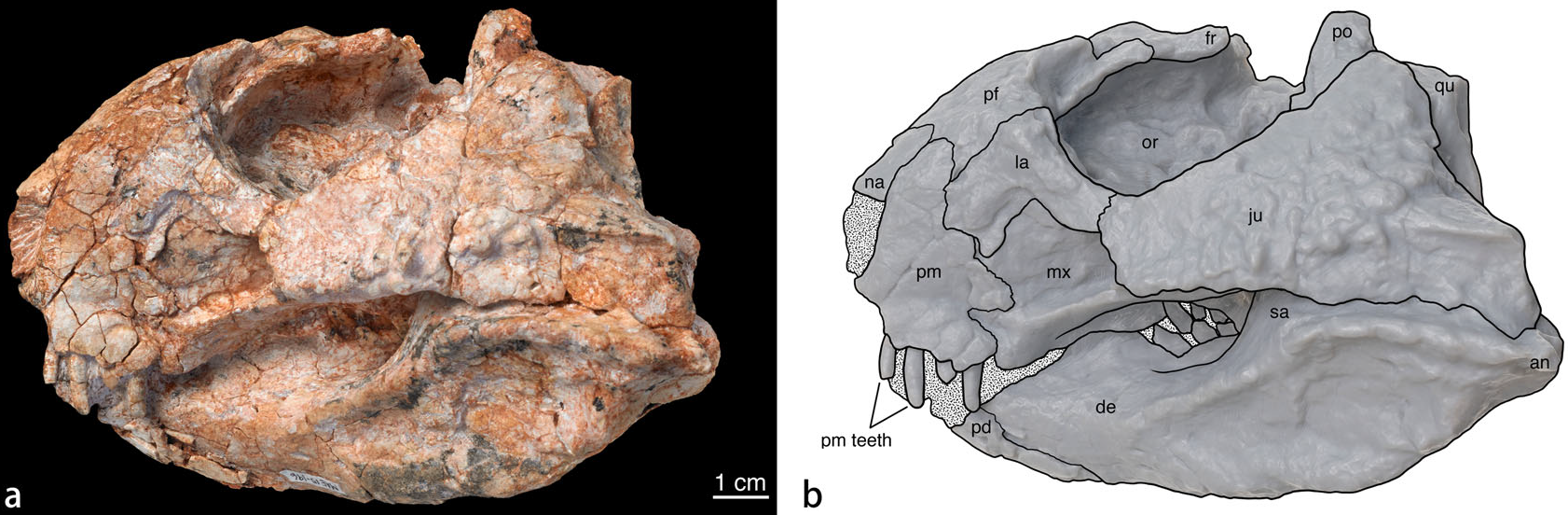
- Holotype skull

Scientific classification
- Domain: Eukaryota
- Kingdom: Animalia
- Phylum: Chordata
- Clade: Dinosauria
- Clade: †Ornithischia
- Clade: †Ceratopsia
- Clade: †Neoceratopsia
- Genus: †Beg; Yu et al., 2020
- Species: †B. tse

Binomial name
- †Beg tse Yu et al., 2020

= Beg tse =

Beg tse Temporal range: Early Cretaceous ~113–94 Ma

Species of neoceratopsian dinosaur

Beg tse (after the Himalayan war deity Beg-tse) is an extinct species of neoceratopsian dinosaurs from the early Cretaceous Ulaanoosh Formation of Mongolia. B. tse is the only species in the genus Beg, known from a partial skull and very fragmentary postcrania. It represents the most basal neoceratopsian currently known.

== Discovery and naming ==
The holotype, IGM 100/3652, was discovered in 2015 near the town of Tsogt-Ovoo in the Ömnögovi Province of Mongolia. Described from the Ulaanoosh Formation, the specimen is dated to 113 to 94 million years ago, at the boundary of the Lower and Upper Cretaceous.

Beg is named after Beg-tse, a Himalayan deity who is the god of war in Mongolian culture. The deity is often depicted with a rugose face and/or body, similar to the appearance of the preserved skull of the dinosaur.

== Description ==
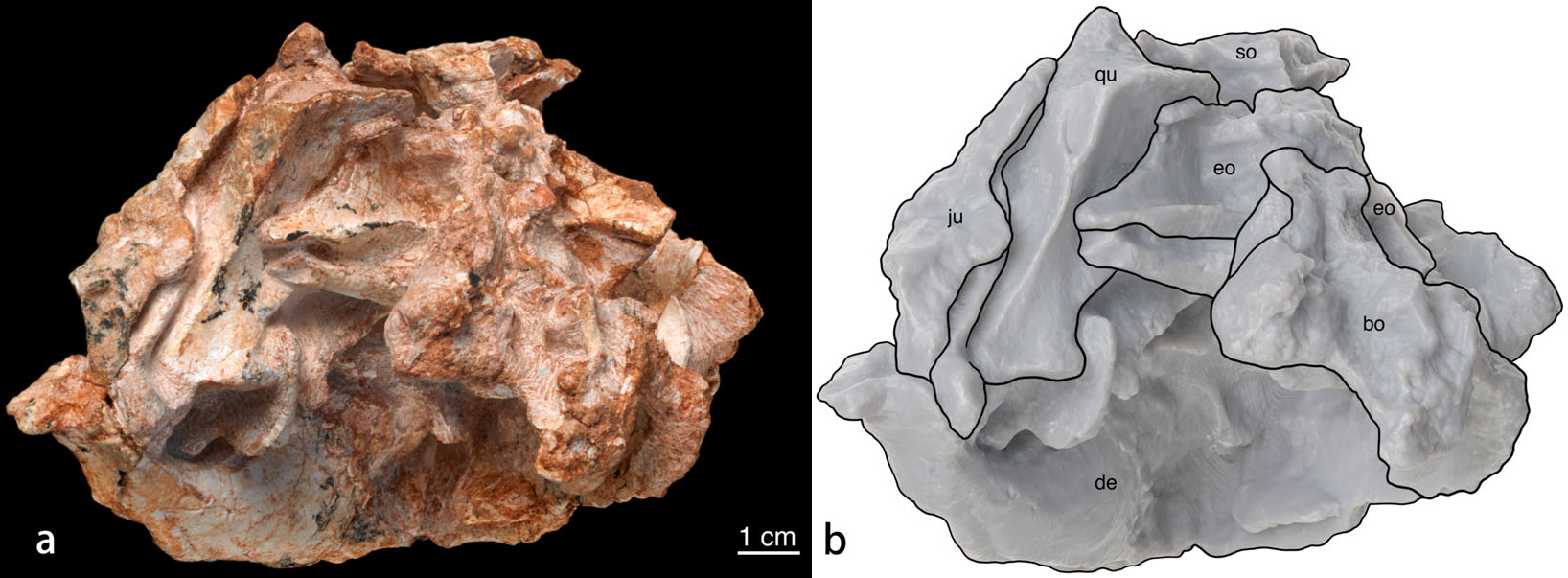
Skull from behind

Based on the size of the skull, about 140 millimetres (5.5 in) long, Beg was most likely a medium-sized basal ceratopsian, similar in size to Yinlong and Liaoceratops. It shows transitional features between basal ceratopsians and other neoceratopsians because it is phylogenetically intermediate between them. Other fossil material, though fragmentary, includes a rib, partial left scapula, partial right ischium, and many bone fragments that cannot be identified.

== Paleoecology ==
Beg is known from the Ulaanoosh Formation of southern Mongolia. Sauropods, turtles and dinosaur eggs assigned to Parafaveoloolithus sp. are also known from the formation.

== See also ==
- List of short species names
