= Dolores Formation =

Dolores Formation may refer to

- Dolores Formation, Chinle Group, Triassic geologic formation of the United States
- Dolores Formation, Uruguay, Pleistocene geologic formation of Uruguay
