= Queguay Formation =

Geologic formation in Uruguay

- Stratigraphic range: Late Cretaceous-Paleocene; ~100.5–56.0 Ma
- Type: Geological formation
- Overlies: Asencio Formation

Lithology
- Primary: limestone

Location
- Country: Uruguay

Type section
- Named for: Queguay River, Uruguay

The Queguay Formation is a geologic formation in Uruguay.

It consists of a lithological group composed of calcareous, calc-siliceous and siliceous rocks, of pedogenic or subterranean origin. It is formed by white and whitish limestones, massive, sandy and brecciated.

== Vertebrate paleofauna ==
Several fossil gastropods have been found here:

- Bahiensis priscus Cabrera & Martínez, 2012
- Biomphalaria manya Cabrera & Martínez, 2018
- Biomphalaria reversa Cabrera, Martínez & Norbis, 2016
- Bulimulus frenguellii Cabrera et al., 2021
- Eoborus charruanus Frenguelli, 1930
- Pupoides gnocco Cabrera & Martínez, 2017

== See also ==
- List of fossiliferous stratigraphic units in Uruguay
- Asencio Formation
