= Rosellichnus =

Scientific classification
- Ichnofamily: †Celliformidae
- Ichnogenus: †Rosellichnus; Genise & Bown, 1996

Type species
- Rosellichnus patagonicus

Ichnogenus of insect trace fossils

Rosellichnus is a Cenozoic trace fossil found in Patagonia, it consists of a cluster of vertical bee cells with smooth inner surface and discrete walls.

Described in 1996 by Jorge Fernando Genise and Thomas M. Bown, it was named after the Uruguayan ichnologist Francisco Lucas Roselli.
