= Hemifaveoloolithus =

Hemifaveoloolithus Temporal range: Turonian

Egg fossil classification
- Basic shell type: †Dinosauroid-spherulitic
- Oofamily: †Faveoloolithidae
- Oogenus: †Hemifaveoloolithus; Wang et al., 2011

Oospecies
- †H. mushanensis Wang et al. 2011 (type)

Oogenus of dinosaur egg

Hemifaveoloolithus is an oogenus of fossil dinosaur egg from the Tiantai basin in Zhejiang Province, China. It is a faveoloolithid, having spherical eggs roughly 13 cm in diameter. The shell is distinctive for being composed of four or five superimposed layers of shell units, and the honeycomb-like arrangement of pore canals.

== History ==
During the 21st century, a great diversity of fossil eggs have been described from the Tiantai Basin. In 2011, paleontologists at the Institute of Vertebrate Paleontology and Paleoanthropology, Chinese Academy of Sciences Wang Qiang, Zhao Zikui, and Wang Xiaolin teamed up with Jiang Yan'gen from the Tiantai Bureau of Land and Resources of Zhejiang Province to report the discovery of several new ootaxa at Tiantai, including Hemifaveoloolithus.

== Distribution ==
Hemifaveoloolithus is one of many ootaxa known from Tiantai County in Zhejiang. It is found in the Upper Cretaceous Chichengshan Formation, which was dated to be 91–94 million years old (during the Turonian) by using U-Pb dating.

== Description ==
Hemifaveoloolithus fossils are limited to a single incomplete nest with ten preserved eggs. The eggs are roughly spherical, measuring 13.0–13.7 cm (5.1–5.4 in) long by 12.0–12.1 cm (4.7–4.8 inches) wide. Its eggshell is 1.60 mm thick. Like dictyoolithids and other faveoloolithids, its shell is composed of multiple superimposed layers of irregular eggshell units. H. muyushanensis is also notable for the high density of pores in its eggshell, about 50 per square millimeter, which give its tangential cross-section a honeycomb-like appearance.

== Paleobiology ==
It is generally uncertain what type of dinosaurs laid faveoloolithid eggs, though they are conjectured to have been laid by sauropods. Unlike most dinosaur eggs, where the shell membrane and the calcareous eggshell form sequentially, in dictyoolithids and faveoloolithids (including Hemifaveoloolithus) the membrane and shell would develop simultaneously, comparable to eggs of modern tuataras.
