= Coccocephalus =

Coccocephalus Temporal range: Bashkirian to Asselian

Scientific classification
- Kingdom: Animalia
- Phylum: Chordata
- Class: Actinopterygii
- Family: †Coccocephalichthyidae; Fowler, 1951
- Genus: †Coccocephalus; Watson, 1925

Type species
- †Coccocephalus wildi Watson, 1925

Other species
- †C. baldwini (Poplin, 1974); †C. tessellatus Beltan, 1981

Synonyms
- Coccocephalichthys Whitley, 1940 (non "Coccocephalus" Fieber, 1860); Cocconiscus White & Moy-Thomas, 1940

Extinct genus of fishes

Coccocephalus is an extinct genus of prehistoric freshwater and marine basal ray-finned fish from the Carboniferous to the early Permian period. The type species, C. wildi, lived during the Bashkirian age of the Pennsylvanian epoch in what is now Lancashire, United Kingdom. One specimen of C. wildi is notable for having the earliest known instance of fossilized brain tissue in a vertebrate.

== Taxonomy ==
The type species was first described as Coccocephalus wildi in 1925 by David Meredith Seares Watson, but because Coccocephalus was thought to be preoccupied (for an extant hemipteran insect), both Gilbert Percy Whitley and Errol White & James Alan Moy-Thomas proposed a new genus name in 1940. Because the article introducing the name Coccocephalichthys Whitley, 1940 was published before the article erecting the name Cocconiscus White & Moy-Thomas, 1940, the former became the valid new genus name for the Carboniferous fish for some time. However, reexamination of Fieber's 1861 insect publication in 1996 revealed that the insect in question is Coccodocephalus, thus the original name Coccocephalus wildi stands as the correct name for this genus and both Coccocephalichthys and Cocconiscus are junior synonyms.

- Family †Coccocephalichthyidae Fowler, 1951 [Cocconiscidae Romer, 1945]
  - Genus †Coccocephalus Watson 1925 [Coccocephalichthys Whitley, 1940; Cocconiscus White & Moy-Thomas, 1940]
    - †C. baldwini (Poplin, 1974) - latest Carboniferous (Gzhelian) of Kansas, USA, marine (Lawrence Formation) [Coccocephalichthys baldwini (Poplin, 1974); Cocconiscus baldwini Poplin, 1974]
    - †C. tessellatus Beltan, 1981 - Early Permian (Asselian) of Uruguay, marine (San Gregorio Formation)
    - †C. wildi Watson, 1925 - Late Carboniferous (Bashkirian) of England, freshwater (Pennine Coal Measures) [Coccocephalichthys wildi (Watson, 1925); Cocconiscus wildi (Watson, 1925)]

Coccocephalus is suggested to belong to the stem-group of Actinopterygii, with all living ray-finned fish more closely related to each other than to Coccocephalus.

== Ecology & evolution ==
In 2023, the type specimen of C. wildi was found to preserve the earliest example of fossilized brain and nerve tissue. The fossil shows that the forebrain in this ray-finned fish was evaginated, a feature otherwise not known in actinopterygians. The results show that the everted forebrain of modern ray-fins evolved later than previously thought. The exceptional preservation of this specimen likely occurred due to the individual being rapidly buried in a low-oxygen environment after death, preventing decomposition of the brain tissue.

== See also ==
- Prehistoric fish
- List of prehistoric bony fish
