= Cercinthus elegans =

Scientific classification
- Domain: Eukaryota
- Kingdom: Animalia
- Phylum: Arthropoda
- Class: Insecta
- Order: Hemiptera
- Suborder: Heteroptera
- Family: Coreidae
- Genus: Cercinthus
- Species: C. elegans

Binomial name
- Cercinthus elegans (Brullé, 1839)

Synonyms
- Coreus elegans Brullé, 1839

Species of true bug

Cercinthus elegans is a species of bugs in the tribe Coreini. It is found in the Canary Islands.
