= Concordia Department =

- Department
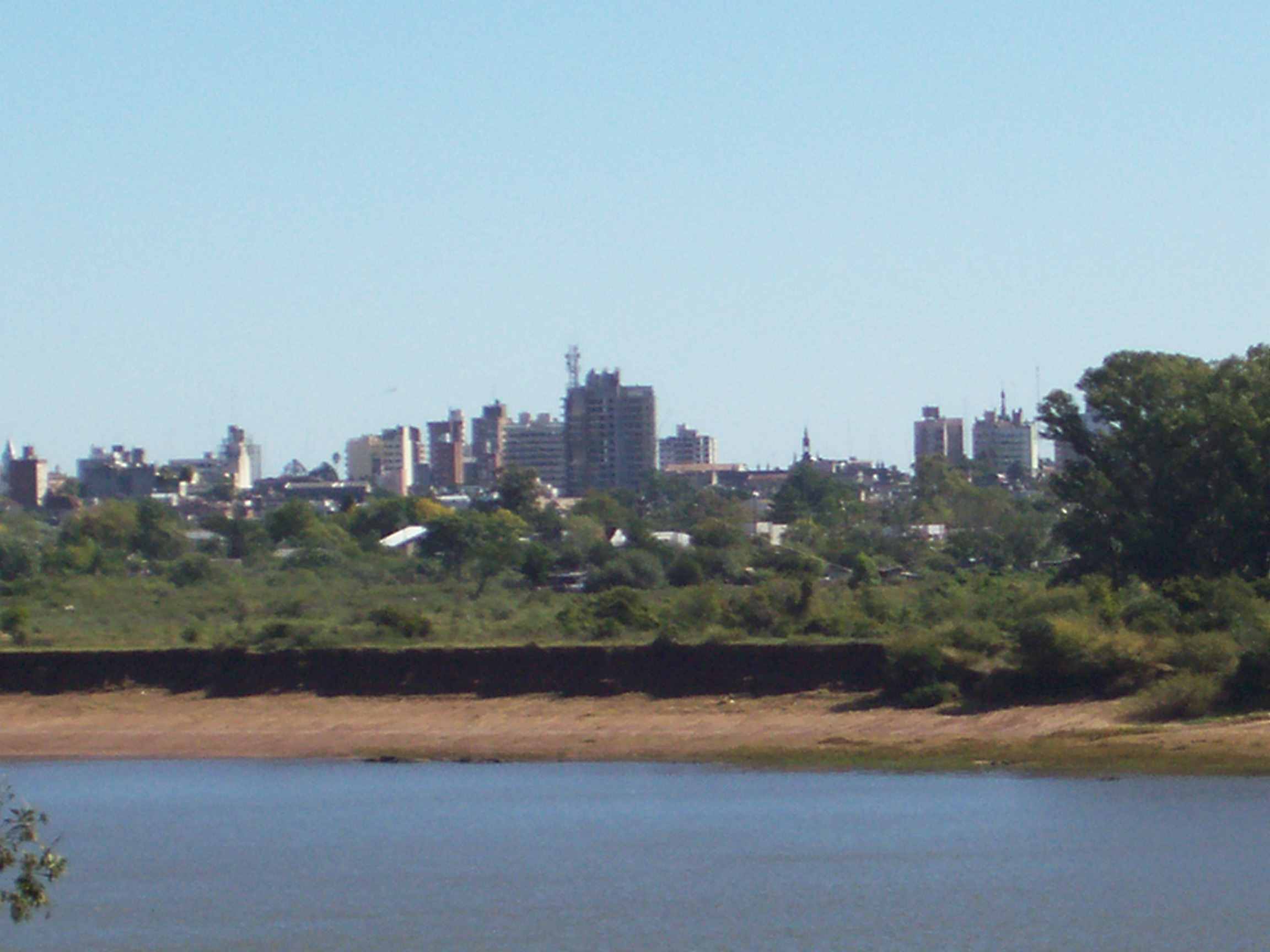
- Concordia skyline as seen from the Uruguayan city of Salto

- Location of Concordia Department within Entre Ríos Province

- Location of Concordia in Argentina
- Coordinates: 31°38′S 58°31′W
- Country: Argentina
- Province: Entre Ríos
- Head town: Concordia

Area
  - Land: 3,259 km^{2} (1,258 sq mi)
  - Rank: 12th

Population (2022)
  - Total: 198,802
  - Density: 61.00/km^{2} (158.0/sq mi)
- Demonym: concordiense
- Time zone: UTC-3 (ART)
- Area code: +345

The Concordia Department (in Spanish, Departamento Concordia) is an administrative subdivision (departamento) of the province of Entre Ríos, Argentina. It is located in the north-east of the province, beside the Uruguay River. The head city and largest settlement is Concordia.

The Salto Grande dam is located in the Concordia Department.

== Districts and municipalities ==
Concordia Department is divided into four districts: Moreira, Suburbios, Yeruá and Yuquerí. There are six municipalities: Concordia, Colonia Ayuí, Estancia Grande, La Criolla, Los Charrúas, and Puerto Yeruá.

== Population ==
As of 2022, out of the 198,902 people who live in Concordia Department, 179,203 live in the head city of Concordia.

== Gallery ==
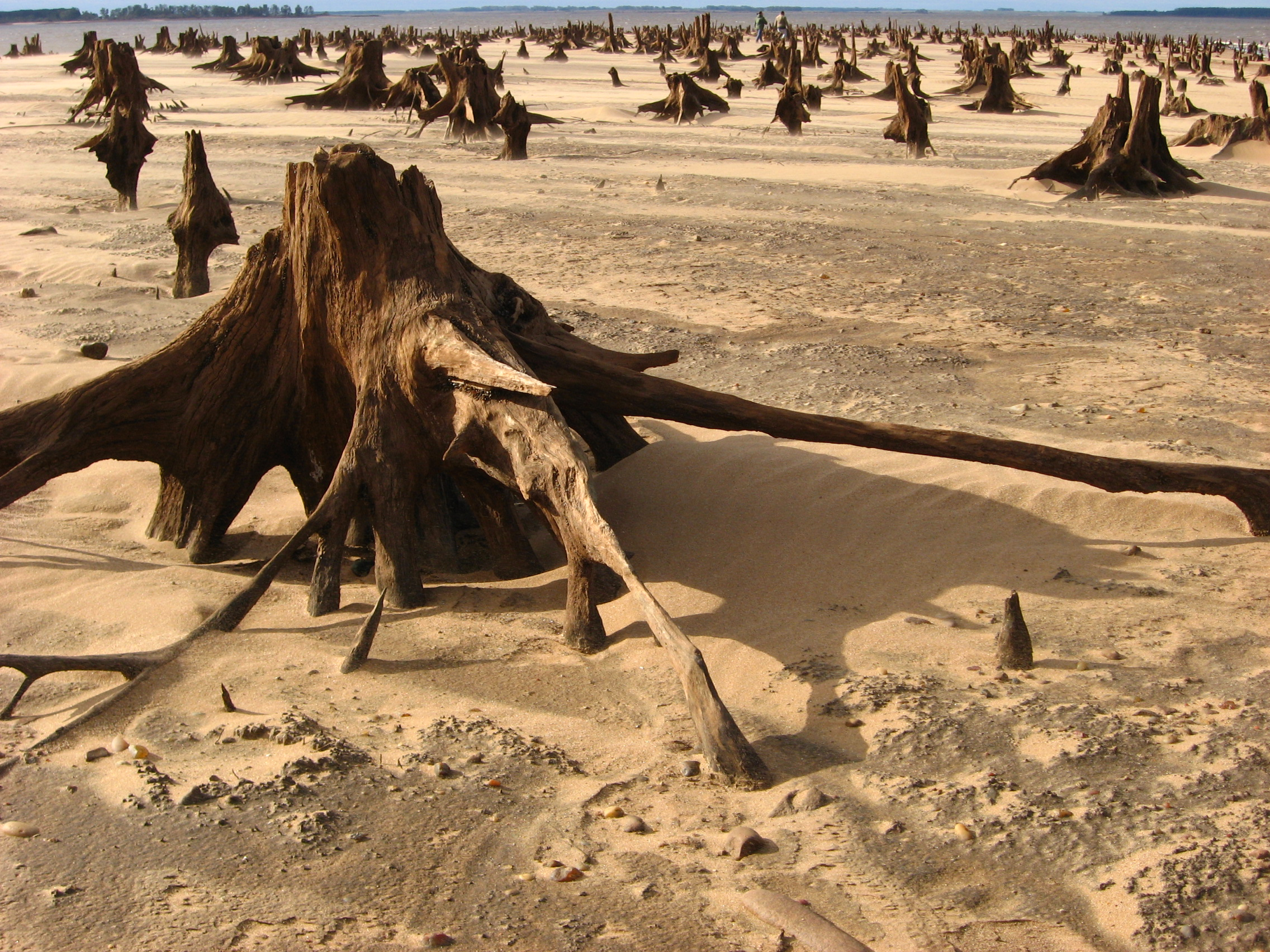
Tree cemetery

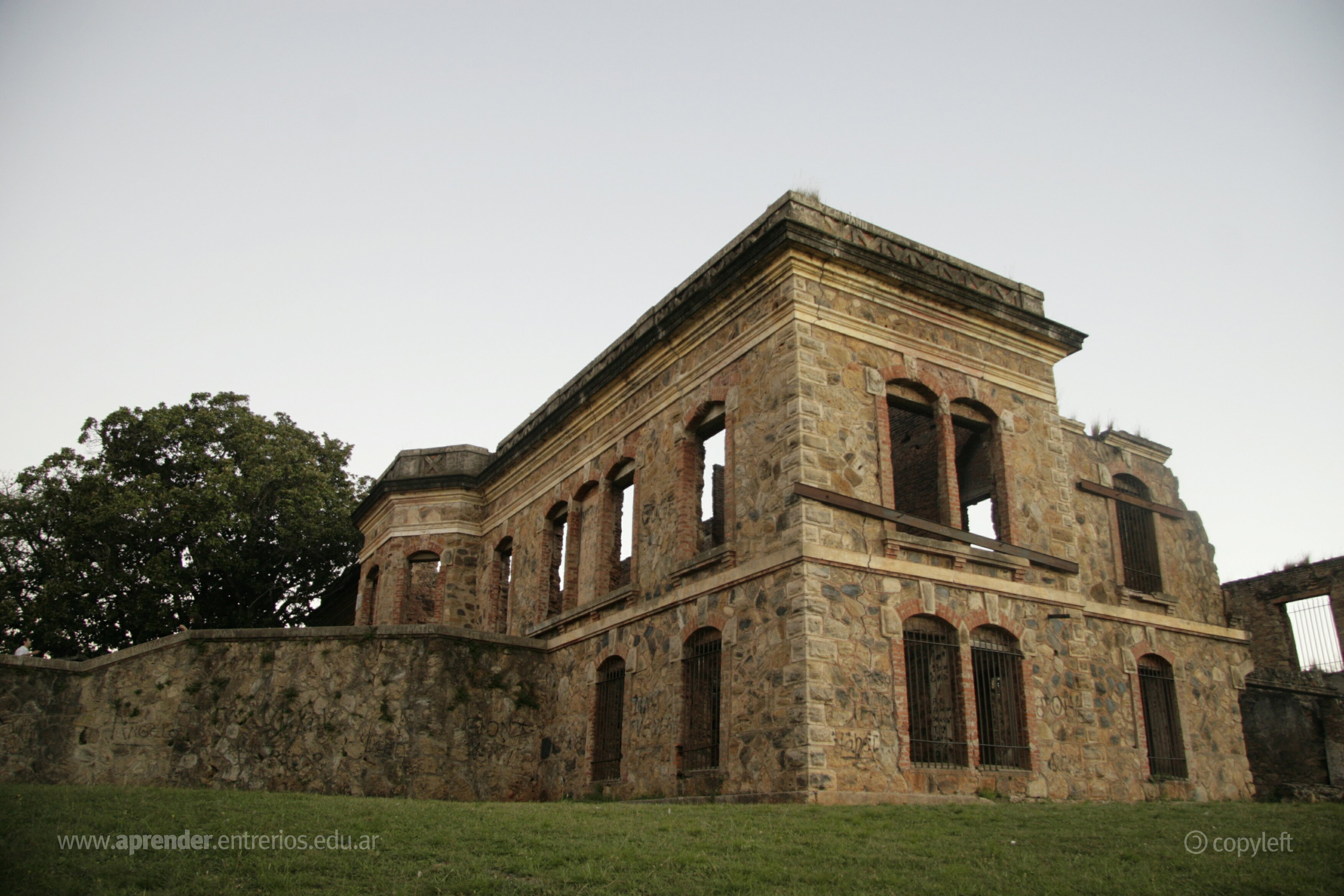
San Carlos Castle

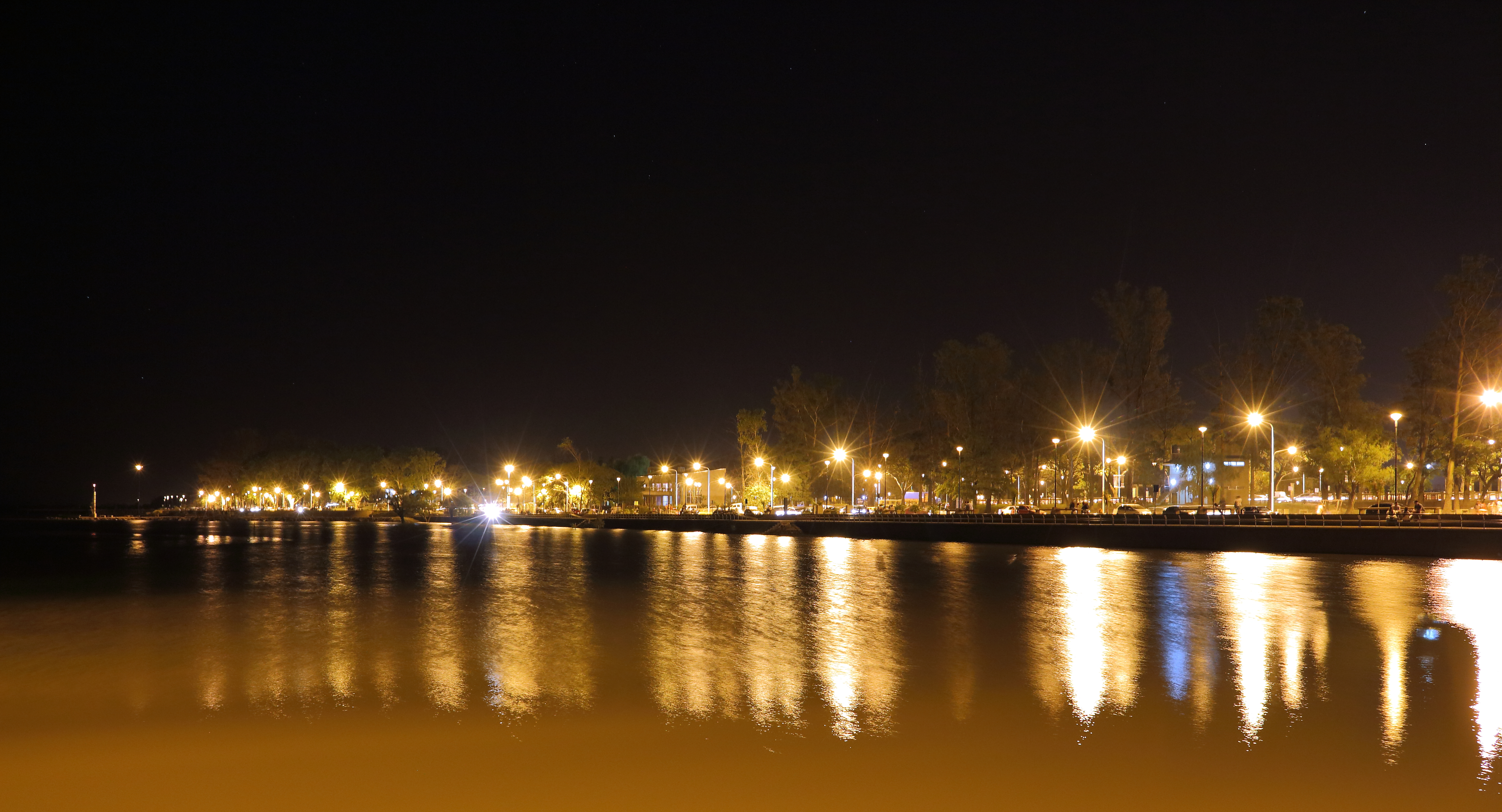
Concordia riverfront

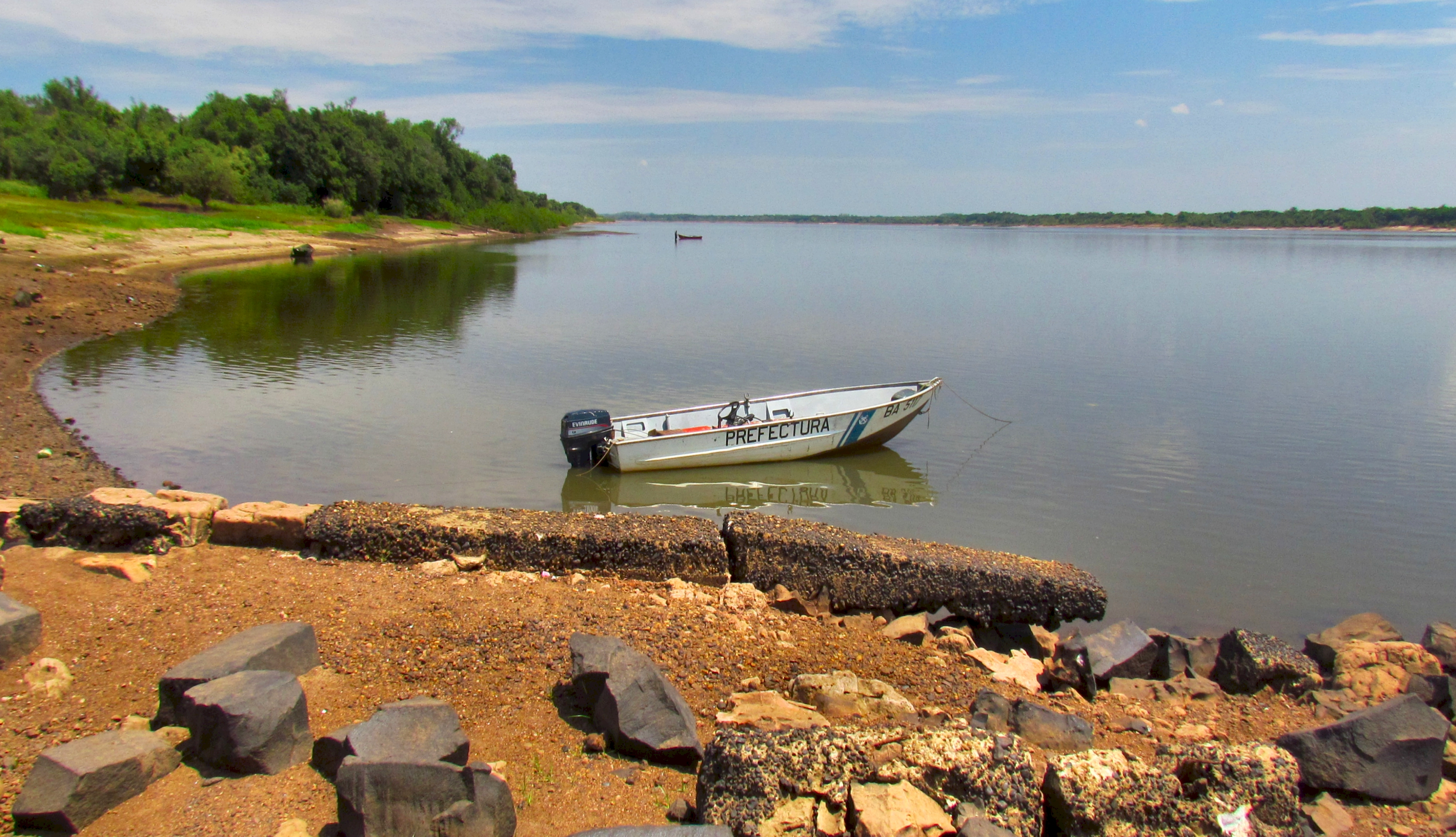
Puerto Yeruá
