= Cercinthus =

Scientific classification
- Kingdom: Animalia
- Phylum: Arthropoda
- Clade: Pancrustacea
- Class: Insecta
- Order: Hemiptera
- Suborder: Heteroptera
- Family: Coreidae
- Subfamily: Coreinae
- Tribe: Coreini
- Genus: Cercinthus; Stål, 1860

Species
- Cercinthus elegans (Brullé, 1839); Cercinthus griseus (Fieber, 1861); Cercinthus lehmannii (Kolenati, 1857)

Synonyms
- Coccocephalus Fieber, 1860 (non Coccocephalus Watson, 1925); Coccodocephalus Fieber, 1861

Genus of true bugs

Cercinthus is a genus of bugs in the tribe Coreini.
