= Tacuarembovum =

Tacuarembovum Temporal range: Campanian-Maastrichtian ~75–66 Ma

Egg fossil classification
- Basic shell type: Ornithoid
- Morphotype: Ornithoid-ratite
- Oofamily: †Elongatoolithidae
- Oogenus: †Tacuarembovum; Mones, 1980

Oospecies
- †Tacuarembovum oblongum Mones, 1980 (type)

Tacuarembovum (sometimes misspelled as "Tacuaremborum"; e.g.,)is an oogenus of fossil egg from the Late Cretaceous (Campanian to Maastrichtian) Asencio Formation of Uruguay. It represents an Elongatoolithid, and pending future analysis may be found to be synonymous with another oospecies.
