= San Gregorio Formation, Uruguay =

Geologic formation in Uruguay

San Gregorio Formation
- Stratigraphic range: Asselian; ~298.9–293.52 Ma
- Type: Geological formation
- Unit of: Itararé Group
- Underlies: Cerro Pelado Formation

Location
- Country: Uruguay

Type section
- Named for: San Gregorio, Uruguay
- San Gregorio Formation, Uruguay

The San Gregorio Formation is an Asselian geologic formation in Uruguay.

== Fossil content ==
The following fossils have been reported from the formation:

- Glaphyrites sp.
- Coccocephalus tessellatus

== See also ==
- List of fossiliferous stratigraphic units in Uruguay
