= Mauricio Castillo =

Costa Rican footballer (born 1987)

Personal information
- Full name: Mauricio Castillo Contreras
- Date of birth: 19 June 1987 (age 39)
- Place of birth: San José, Costa Rica
- Height: 1.71 m (5 ft 7 in)
- Position: Midfielder

Team information
- Current team: La U Universitarios

Youth career
- Saprissa

Senior career*
Years	Team	Apps	(Gls)
2010–2014	Saprissa	50	(3)
2011–2012	→ Belén (loan)	33	(5)
2013	→ Cartaginés (loan)	11	(4)
2014	→ Qingdao Jonoon (loan)	25	(3)
2015–2017	Cartaginés	52	(12)
2017	Deportivo Carchá	14	(0)
2017–2018	Cartaginés	26	(1)
2019	La U Universitarios	1	(0)
2019	Municipal Grecia	15	(1)
2020–	La U Universitarios	9	(0)

International career
2012–2014	Costa Rica	8	(1)
- * Club domestic league appearances and goals as of 19:05, 11 May 2020 (UTC)

Mauricio Castillo Contreras (born 19 June 1987) is a Costa Rican international footballer who plays professionally for La U Universitarios, as a midfielder.

== Club career ==
Castillo has played for Saprissa, Belén, Cartaginés and Qingdao Jonoon.

In January 2015, Castillo rejoined Cartaginés.

== International career ==
Castillo made his debut for Costa Rica in 2012. He has represented his country in FIFA World Cup qualification matches, and played at the 2013 CONCACAF Gold Cup.
