= Puerto Yeruá =

Coordinates: 31°32′07″S 58°00′56″W

- Town
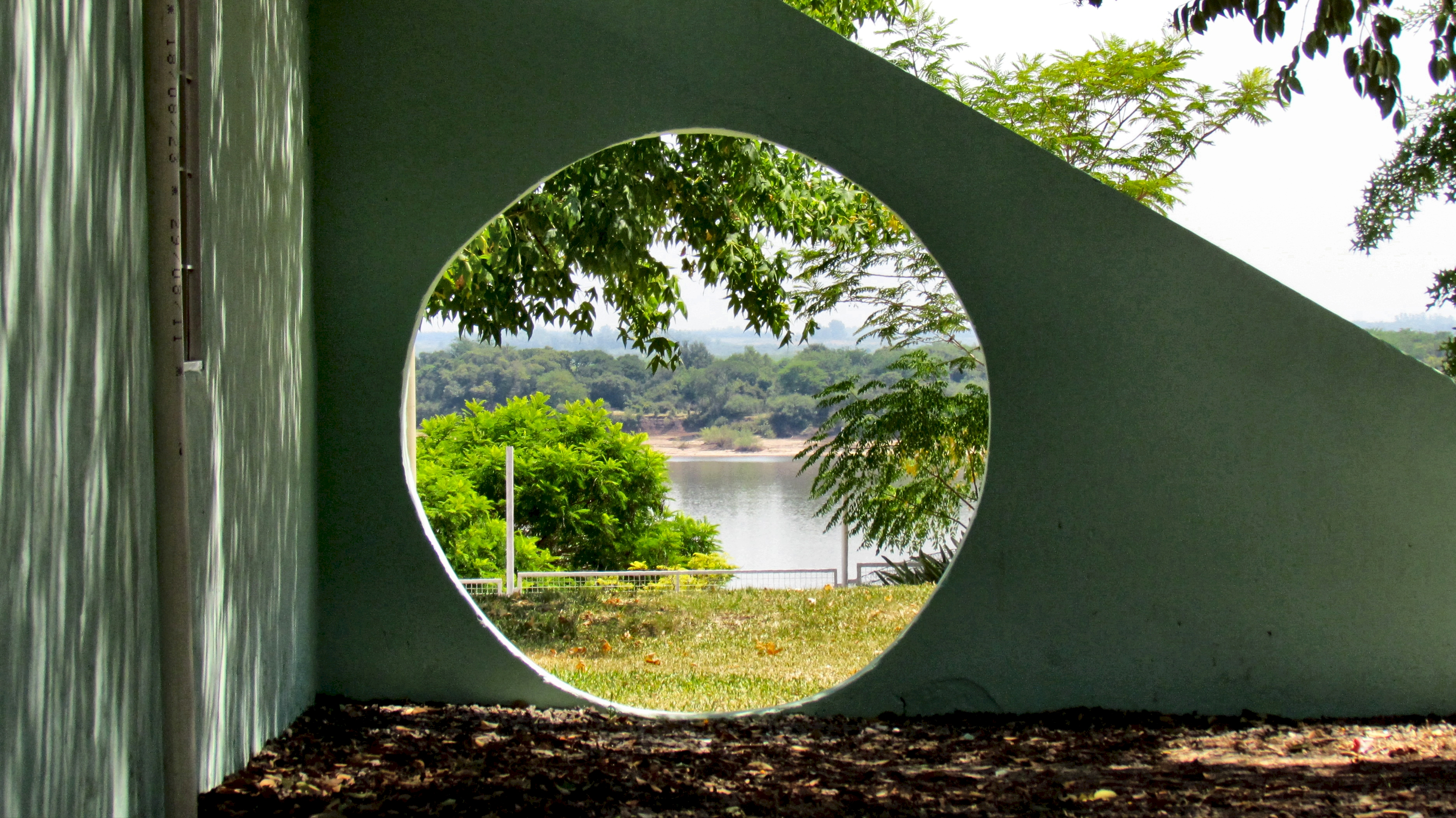
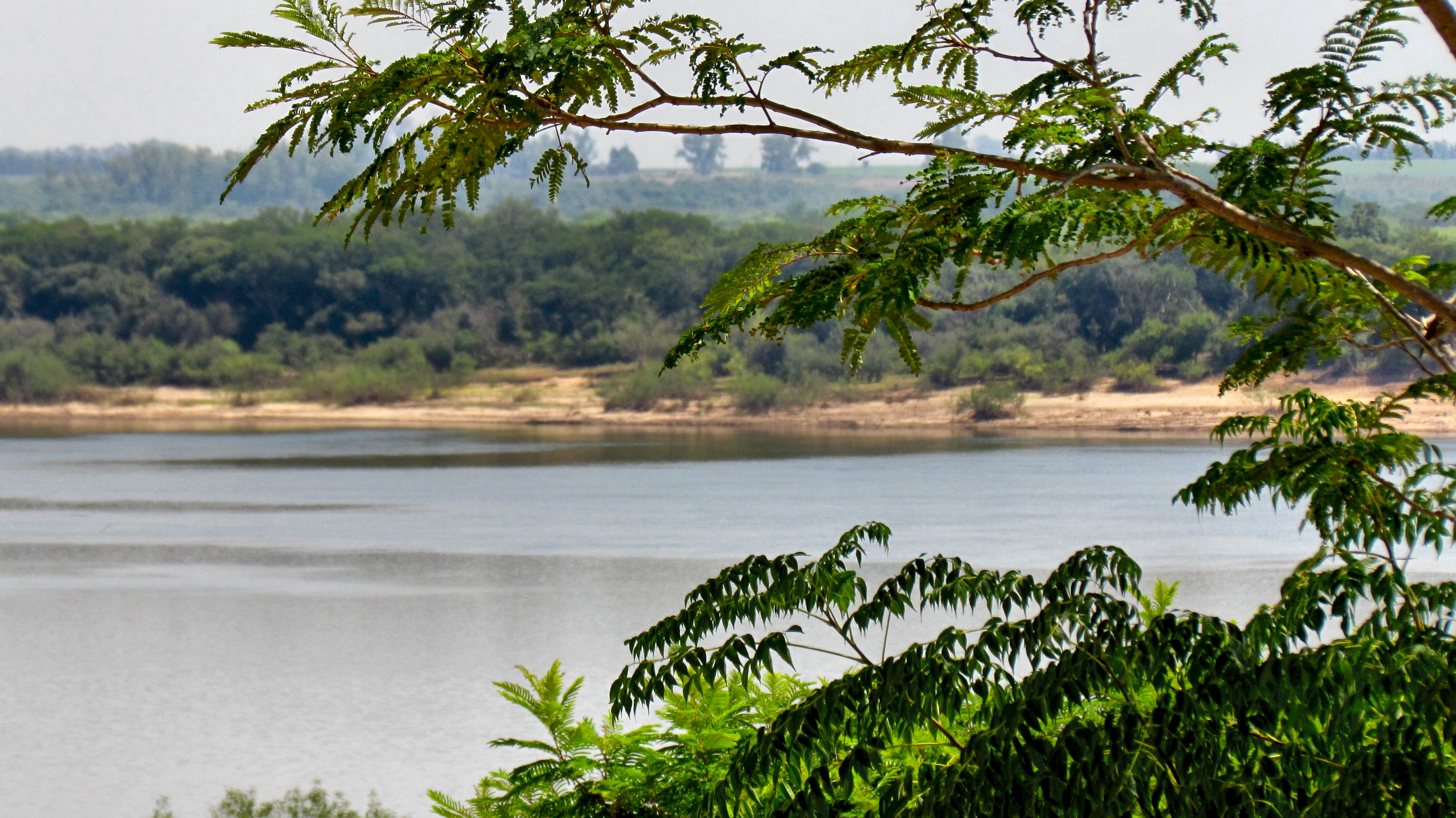
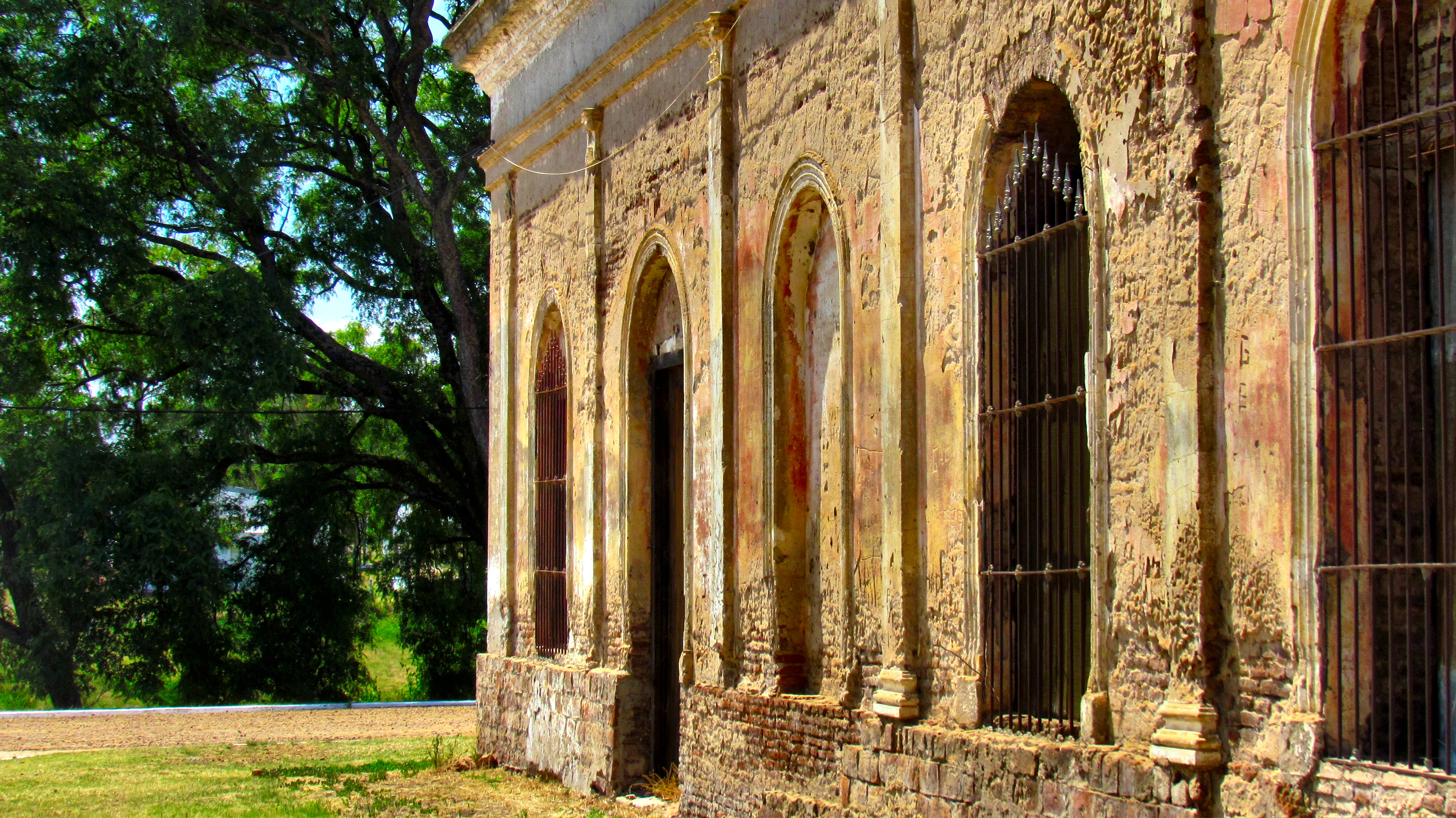
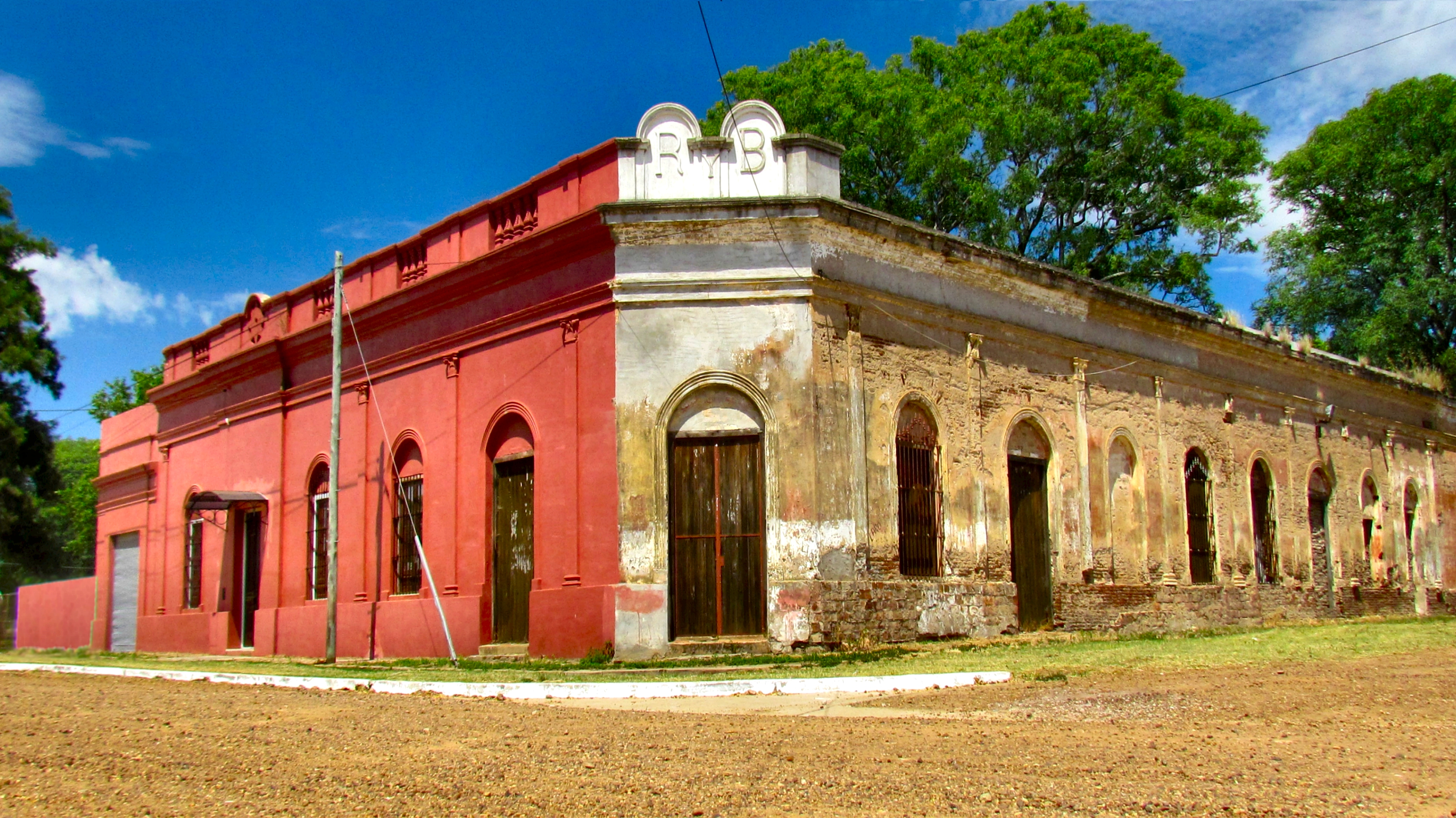
- Interactive map of Puerto Yeruá
- Country: Argentina
- Province: Entre Ríos
- Department: Concordia Department
- Foundation: November 20th, 1888

Government
  - Intendant: Daniel Sergio Benítez (Justicialist Party)

Population (2022)
  - Total: 1,978

Puerto Yeruá is a town and municipality in Concordia Department, Entre Ríos Province, Argentina. It is located 15 km (9 mi) from the city of Concordia.

To the west of Puerto Yeruá lies National Route 14, from which the town is accessed via a paved 17.5 km road. The town has access to various services in the neighboring city of Concordia, whose commercial center is 38 km away by road and connected by bus service. There is a detachment of the Argentine Naval Prefecture in the town.

The municipal boundaries of Puerto Yeruá are bordered to the west by the municipal boundaries of Estancia Grande, and to the south, the Yeruá Stream separates it from the rural population centers of Clodomiro Ledesma and Nueva Escocia. The Uruguay River lies to the north and east.

In the ravines overlooking the Uruguay River, there is a rocky outcrop of geological interest, which gave its name to the Puerto Yeruá Formation, dating from the Upper Cretaceous.

== History ==
In 1835, Scottish Donald Campbell settled in Estancia Grande to dedicate himself to raising sheep for wool production, which was exported to London through his own port located in the current Puerto Yeruá. The area was boosted by the establishment of the Yeruá National Colony by law sanctioned on November 20, 1888, in which immigrants of 17 nationalities were settled. This date is taken as founding. On February 5, 1889, the national government, through a decree, permanently enabled the Puerto Yeruá Colony, under the dependence of the Customs and the Revenue Administration of Concordia.

== Gallery ==
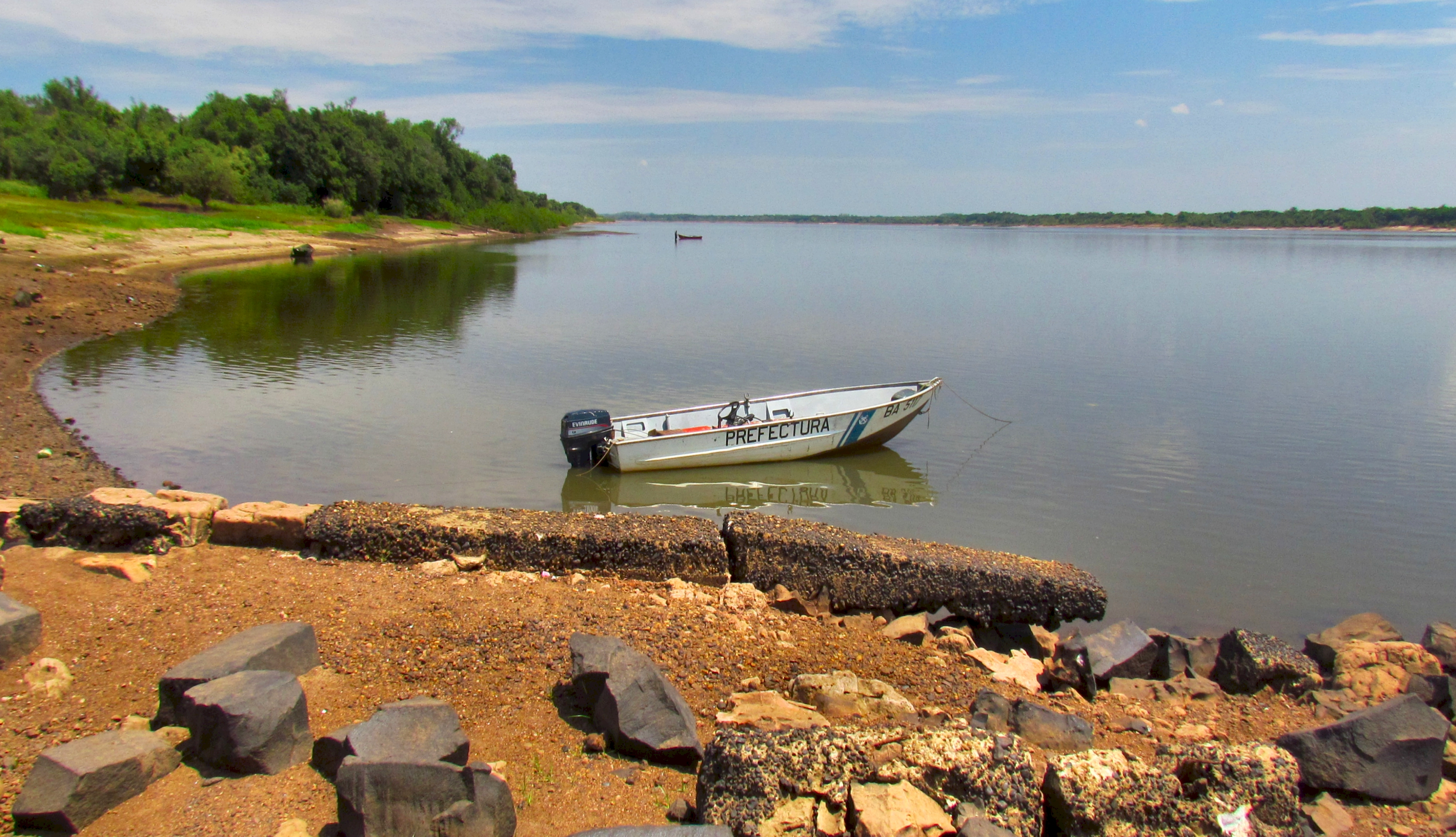

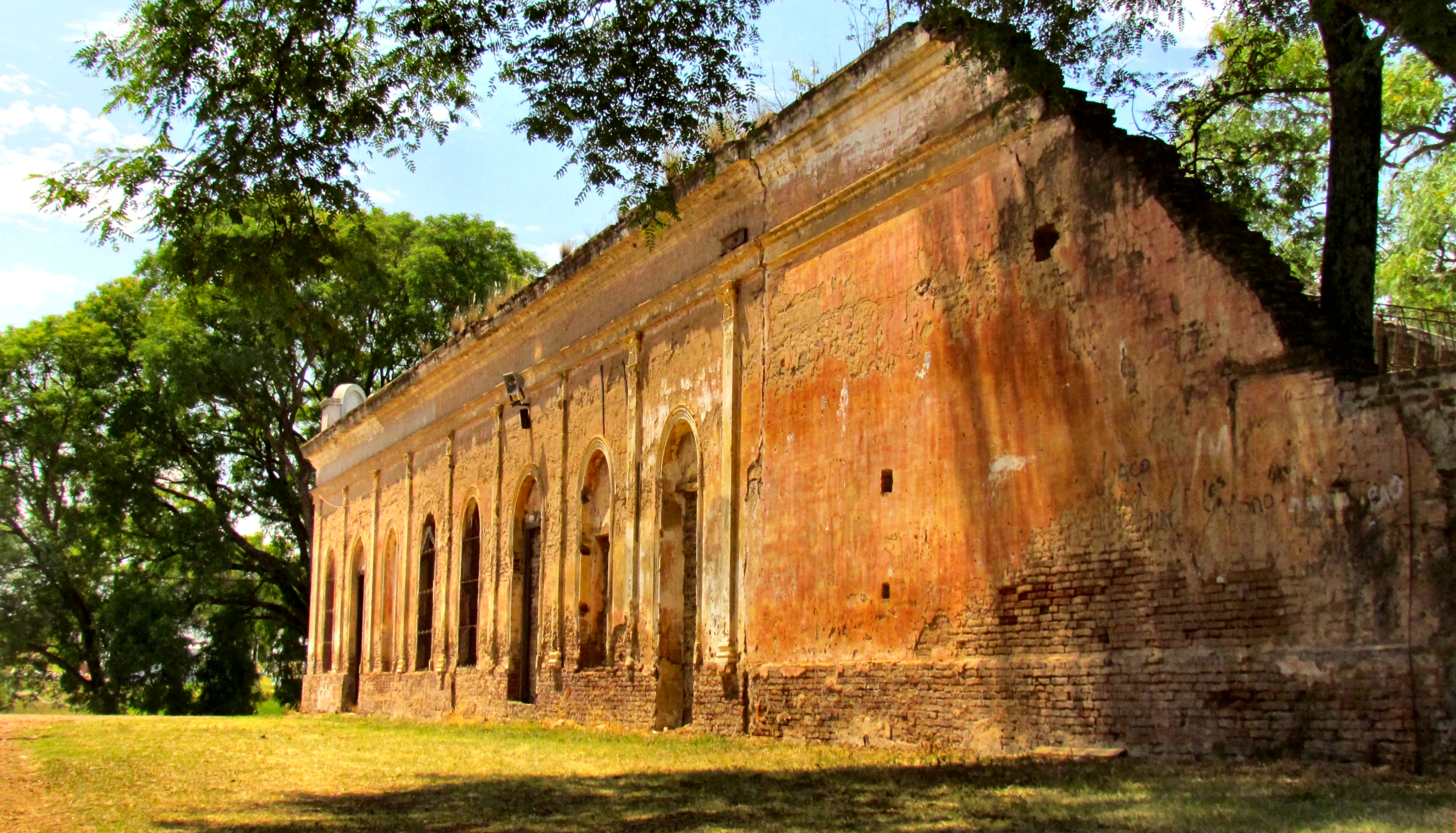
