= Castillo Formation =

Castillo Formation can refer to:

- Castillo Formation, Venezuela, an Early Miocene geologic formation in Venezuela
- Castillo Formation, Argentina, a Cenomanian geologic formation in Argentina
- Castillo Pedroso Formation, a Jurassic geologic formation in Spain
- Cerro Castillo Formation, a Jurassic geologic formation in Argentina
- Sierra del Castillo Formation, a Carboniferous geologic formation in Spain
