= Guichón Formation =

Late Cretaceous geological formation in Uruguay

- Stratigraphic range: Aptian-Santonian; ~125–85 Ma
- Type: Geological formation
- Unit of: Paysandú Group
- Underlies: Mercedes Formation
- Overlies: Arapey Formation
- Thickness: Up to >100 m (330 ft) (in wells)

Lithology
- Primary: Sandstone
- Other: Conglomerate

Location
- Coordinates: 32.0°S 57.7°W
- Approximate paleocoordinates: 38.4°S 30.0°W
- Region: Paysandú Department
- Country: Uruguay
- Extent: Norte Basin

Type section
- Named for: Guichón
- Guichón Formation (Uruguay)

The Guichón Formation is a Late Cretaceous geologic formation of the Paysandú Group in Uruguay. Dinosaur remains are among the fossils that have been recovered from the formation.

== Description ==
The Guichón Formation comprises mainly pink-greyish to reddish sandstones, which contain moderate to well-sorted, subrounded, fine to medium-sized grains in a pelitic matrix. These sandstones (which compositionally are feldspathic wackes) are either massive or may instead exhibit parallel lamination, cross-lamination and graded bedding. These lithologies were deposited in southwest-trending alluvial–fluvial systems comprising low-sinuosity channels traversing through sandy plains. Subordinate to the already mentioned sandstones are conglomeratic and pelitic lithologies, interpreted as channel-fill and overbank deposits, respectively. It is inferred that the Guichón Formation was deposited in warm, semi-arid climatic conditions. The formation has been correlated to the Puerto Yeruá Formation of northwestern Argentina.

The formation reaches a thickness of more than 100 metres (330 ft) in wells perforating the formation. It is overlain by the Mercedes Formation and overlies the Arapey Formation.

== Fossil content ==
The following fossils have been reported from the formation:

Color key: Taxon / Reclassified taxon / Taxon falsely reported as present / Dubious taxon or junior synonym / Ichnotaxon / Ootaxon / Morphotaxon	Notes; Uncertain or tentative taxa are in small text; ~~crossed out~~ taxa are discredited.

=== Dinosaurs ===
==== Ornithischians ====
Ornithischians of the Guichón Formation
Genus	Species	Location	Stratigraphic position	Material	Notes	Images
Iguanodontia indet.	Indeterminate	Paysandú Department, Uruguay	Aptian to Santonian	Teeth	A iguanodontian ornithopod	

==== Sauropods ====
Sauropods of the Guichón Formation
Genus	Species	Location	Stratigraphic position	Material	Notes	Images
Mesetasaurus	M. protector	Paysandú Department, Uruguay	Coniacian to Maastrichtian	Caudal vertebrae	A aeolosaurin lithostrotian	
Udelartitan	U. celeste	Paysandú Department, Uruguay	Santonian to Campanian	Partial skeleton	A saltasauroid titanosaur	

==== Theropods ====
Theropods of the Guichón Formation
Genus	Species	Location	Stratigraphic position	Material	Notes	Images
Theropoda indet.	Indeterminate	Paysandú Department, Uruguay	Aptian to Santonian	Teeth	An indeterminate theropod	

=== Crocodylomorphs ===
Crocodylomorphs of the Guichón Formation
Genus	Species	Location	Stratigraphic position	Material	Notes	Images
Uruguaysuchus	U. aznarezi	Paysandú Department, Uruguay	Campanian to Maastrichtian		A uruguaysuchid notosuchian	

=== Oofossils ===
Oofossils of the Guichón Formation
Genus	Species	Location	Stratigraphic position	Material	Notes	Images
Sphaerovum	S. sp	Paysandú Department, Uruuay				

== See also ==
- List of dinosaur-bearing rock formations
  - List of stratigraphic units with indeterminate dinosaur fossils
- List of fossiliferous stratigraphic units in Uruguay
