= Charrua, Rio Grande do Sul =

Municipality in Brazil

Coordinates: 27°55′S 52°02′W

- Municipality
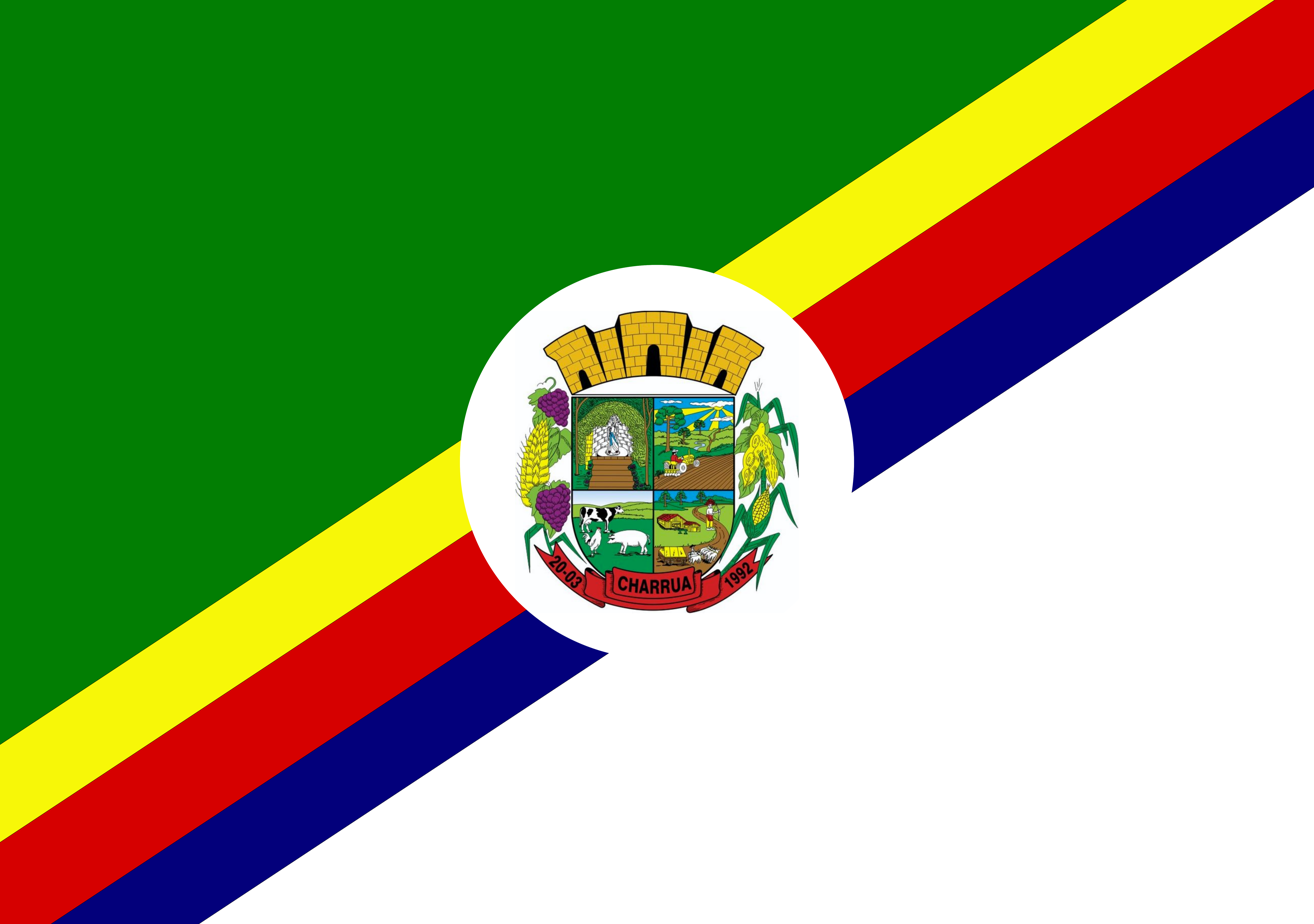
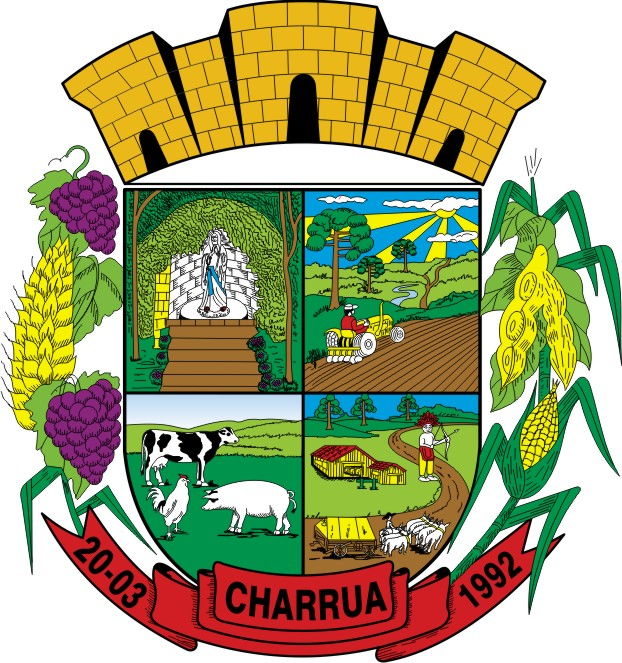
- Flag Coat of arms
- Interactive map of Charrua, Rio Grande do Sul
- Country: Brazil
- Time zone: UTC−3 (BRT)

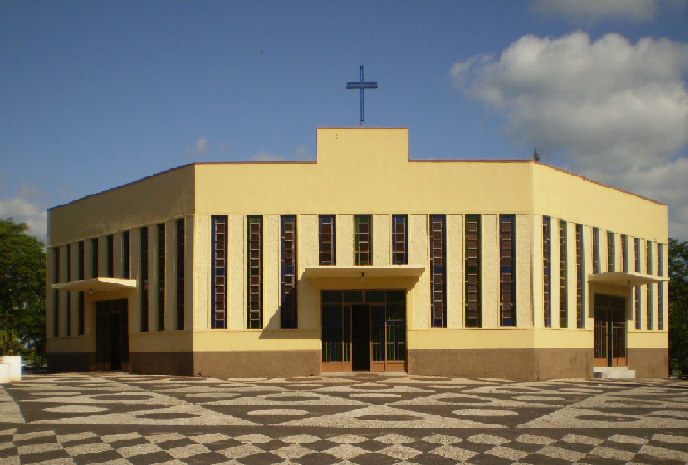

Charrua is a municipality in the state of Rio Grande do Sul, Brazil. As of 2020, the estimated population was 3,252.

== See also ==
- List of municipalities in Rio Grande do Sul
