= Dolores Formation, Uruguay =

Geologic formation in Uruguay

Dolores Formation
- Stratigraphic range: Late Pleistocene-Early Holocene; ~0.03–0.01 Ma
- Type: Geological formation

Location
- Country: Uruguay
- Extent: Paraná Basin

Type section
- Named for: Dolores, Uruguay

The Dolores Formation is a geologic formation in Uruguay. The formation is dated to the Late Pleistocene-Early Holocene. Performing optically stimulated luminescence and thermoluminescence methods on sand samples from different locations within the formation produced ages between 32,230 ± 2,640 and 10,570 ± 990 years ago, while a set of calibrated radiocarbon dating based on organic soil, wood, and mammal teeth resulted in ages between 27,436 and 11,857 years ago.

== Fossil content ==
The following fossils have been reported from the formation:

== Amphibians ==
=== Salientia ===
Genus	Species	Family	Locality	Material	Notes	Images
Ceratophrys	C. sp	Ceratophrynidae	Limetas Creek			

== Birds ==
=== Gruiformes ===
Genus	Species	Family	Locality	Material	Notes	Images
Phorusrhacidae indet	Indeterminate		Casil Quarry Perico Flaco Creek			
Psilopterus .	P. sp.		Curupí Creek			

== Mammals ==
=== Xenarthra ===
Genus	Species	Family	Locality	Material	Notes	Images
Propaopus	P. sp	Dasypodidae	Casil Quarry Aparicio Creek			
Pampatherium	P. typum	Pampatheriidae				
Panochthus		Glyptodontidae				
Glyptodon	G. clavipes	Glyptodontidae	Aparicio Creek El Caño Creek (lower level)			
Doedicurus		Glyptodontidae				
Neuryurus	N. sp	Glyptodontidae	Casil Quarry			
Lestodon	L. armatus	Mylodontidae	Casil Quarry Limetas Creek El Caño Creek (lower level)			
Catonyx	C. cuvieri	Mylodontidae	Aparicio Creek El Caño Creek (upper level) Chileno Creek Arenal Chico Creek			

=== Proboscidea ===
Genus	Species	Family	Locality	Material	Notes	Images
Notiomastodon	N. platensis	Gomphotheriidae	Casil Quarry Santa Regina Campo Viñoles			

=== Meridiungulata ===
Genus	Species	Family	Locality	Material	Notes	Images
Toxodon	T. cf. platensis	Toxodontidae	Casil Quarry Limetas Creek			
Macrauchenia	M. patagonica	Macraucheniidae	Casil Quarry Aparicio Creek			
Neolicaphrium	N. recens	Proterotheriidae	Bahía de Colonia			

=== Perissodactyla ===
Genus	Species	Family	Locality	Material	Notes	Images
Hippidion	sp.	Equidae				
Equus	sp.					

Genus	Species	Family	Locality	Material	Notes	Images
Hemiauchenia	sp.	Camelidae				
Ozotocerus	O. bezoarticus	Cervidae	Casil Quarry			

=== Rodentia ===
Genus	Species	Family	Locality	Material	Notes	Images
Myocastor	sp.	Echimyidae				
Ctenomys	C. kraglievichi	Ctenomyidae	Limetas Creek			
Dolichotis	D cf. patagonum	Caviidae	Pilatos Creek			
Galea	G. ortodonta	Caviidae	El Caño Creek (lower level)			
Lagostomus	L. sp	Chinchillidae	El Caño Creek (lower level)			

=== Carnivora ===
Genus	Species	Family	Locality	Material	Notes	Images
Smilodon	S. populator	Felidae	Limetas Creek			
Smilodon	S. fatalis	Felidae				
Panthera	P. onca	Felidae	El Caño Creek (lower level)			
Dusicyon	D. avus	Canidae	Beach of El Caño Creek			
Cerdocyon	C. thous	Canidae	Beach of El Caño Creek			

- Catonyx cuvieri
- Hippidion
- Lestodon armatus
- Macrauchenia
- Panochthus tuberculatus
- Smilodon fatalis
- Smilodon populator
- Notiomastodon platensis
- Toxodon

== See also ==
- List of fossiliferous stratigraphic units in Uruguay

== Bibliography ==
- Martínez, Sergio A.; Ubilla, M. (2009), El Cuaternario en Uruguay, Universidad de la República de Uruguay, p. 211
