= Estancia Grande, Entre Ríos =

Coordinates: 31°10′S 58°11′W

Estancia Grande Colonia Yeruá
- Municipality and village
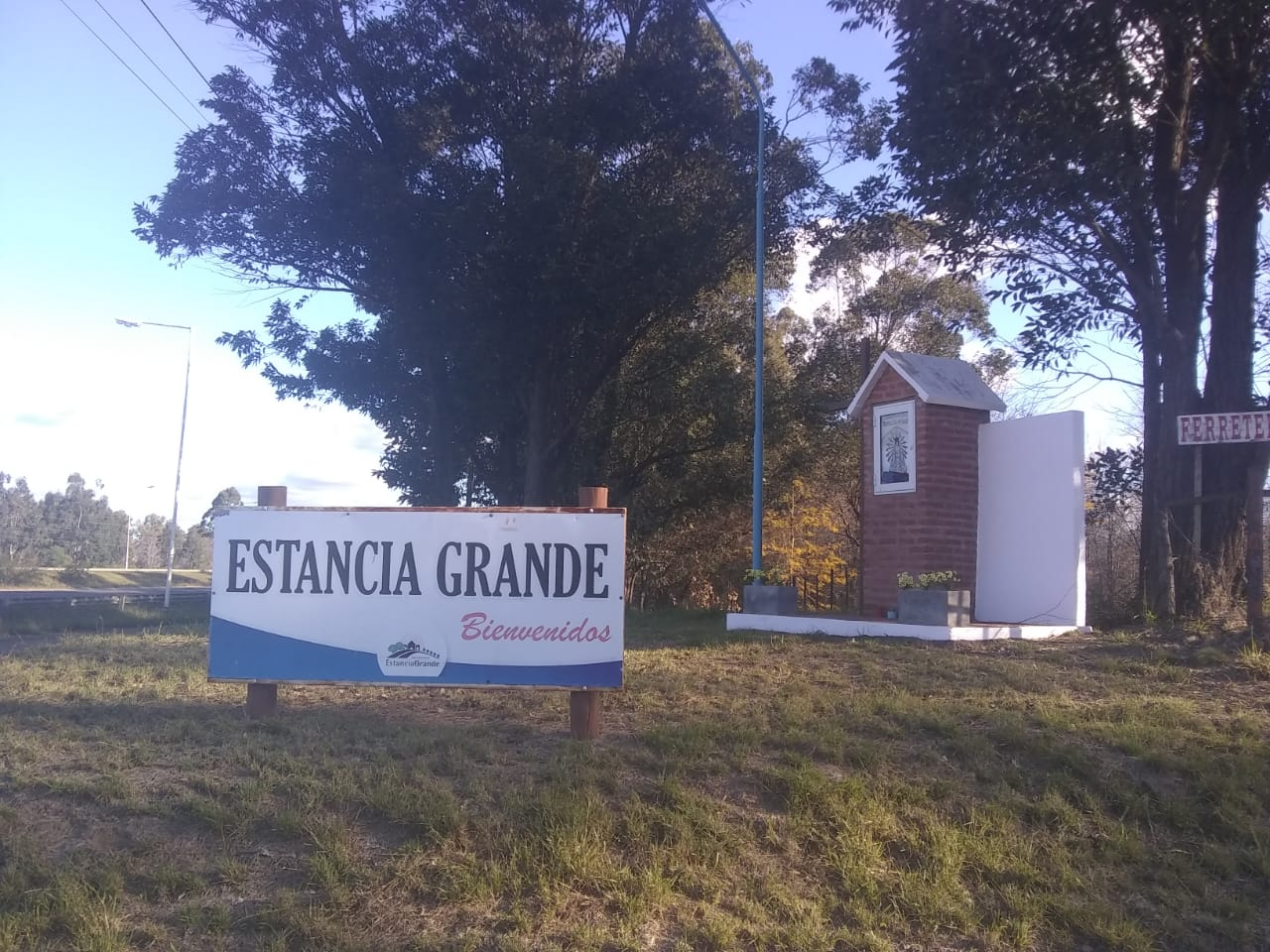

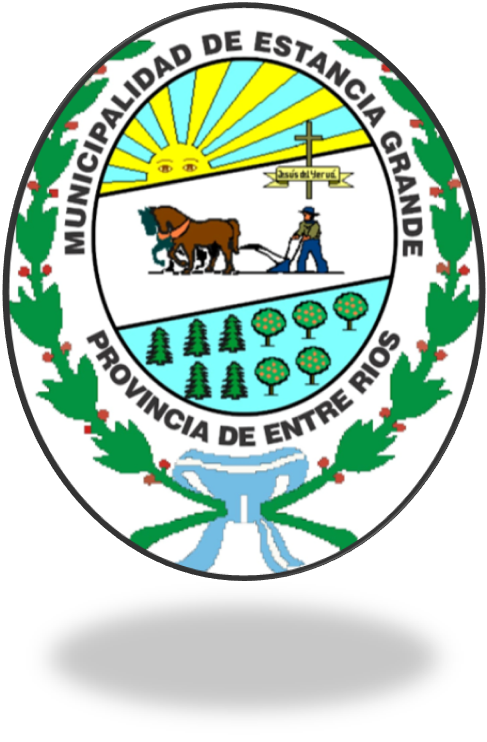
- Coat of arms
- Interactive map of Estancia Grande
- Country: Argentina
- Province: Entre Ríos Province

Population (2022)
  - Municipality and village: 3,089
  - Urban: 1,028
  - Rural: 2,061
- Time zone: UTC−3 (ART)

Estancia Grande, also known as Colonia Yeruá, is a municipality in the Yuquerí district of the Concordia Department in Entre Ríos Province, Argentina. The municipality comprises the towns of Calabacilla, and Estancia Grande and rural areas. The main productive activities are citriculture, livestock, forestry, horticulture and beekeeping. In the 2022 census, the municipality had 3,089 inhabitants, up from 2,512 in 2010.
