= Teisseirei =

Teisseirei Temporal range: Cretaceous

Trace fossil classification
- Ichnofamily: Coprinisphaeridae
- Ichnogenus: †Teisseirei; Roselli, 1939

Ichnogenus of trace fossil

Teisseirei is a Cretaceous trace fossil representing the pupation chamber of a sphinx moth. It has been found in Argentina and Uruguay (Asencio Formation). Later they were also found in the Early Oligocene Santiago Yolomécatl site.

Francisco Lucas Roselli described in 1939 the ichnogenus Teisseirei and its unique ichnospecies, Teisseirei barattinia. It was named for Auguste Teisseire, a French amateur palaeontologist, and for Luis Barattini, the Director of the National Oceanographic Museum of Uruguay at that time.
