= Cerro Castillo Formation =

Geologic formation in Argentina

- Stratigraphic range: Jurassic
- Type: Geological formation

Location
- Country: Argentina

The Cerro Castillo Formation is a Jurassic geologic formation in Argentina. Dinosaur remains diagnostic to the genus level are among the fossils that have been recovered from the formation.

== Paleofauna ==
- Megalosaurus chubutensis - "Tooth." (nomen dubium)
- M. inexpectatus - "Tooth." - (tetan indet)

== See also ==
- List of dinosaur-bearing rock formations
  - List of stratigraphic units with few dinosaur genera
