= Parafaveoloolithus =

Parafaveoloolithus Temporal range: Late Cretaceous

Egg fossil classification
- Basic shell type: †Dinosauroid-spherulitic
- Oofamily: †Faveoloolithidae
- Oogenus: †Parafaveoloolithus; Zhang, 2010

Oospecies
- †P. microporus Zhang, 2010 (type); †P. xipingensis Fang et al. 1998; †P. macroporus Zhang, 2010; †P. tiansicunensis Zhang, 2010; †P. guoqingsiensis Fang et al. 2000; †P. pingxiangensis Zou et al. 2013

Oogenus of dinosaur egg

Parafaveoloolithus is an oogenus of Faveoloolithid fossil egg, known from the Cretaceous of China.

== Description ==
Parafaveoloolithus is diagnosed by its spherical or oval eggs, with a single layer of eggshell units (or a two superimposed layers in some portions). The growth lines of the shell units are undefined. Shell units are prismatic, and separated near the surface of the eggshell.

== Oospecies ==
Parafaveoloolithus contains six oospecies:

- P. microporus - Spherical eggs from the Tiantai basin with a single layer of eggshell units. They are roughly 14 cm in diameter, with an eggshell that is 2.2-2.35 mm thick. It is very similar to Faveoloolithus ningxiaensis.
- P. xipingensis - Described in 1998 as a species of Youngoolithus. It is from the Upper Cretaceous of Xixia County, Henan Province. It was moved to Parafaveoloolithus because of its slender prismatic shell units and straight pores.
- P. macroporus - Oval eggs, known from the Tiantai basin, with large pore canals. The eggs are symmetrical, and about 13 cm in diameter.
- P. tiansicunensis - Also from Tiantai, P. tiansicunensis is very similar to P. microporus and P. macroporus, but it has a thinner shell and the pore canals narrow sharply near the outer surface of its shell.
- P. guoqingsiensis - Spherical eggs 18.7 cm in diameter, native to Tiantai, with numerous pores looking like a honeycomb in cross-section. This oospecies was originally described as an oospecies of Dendroolithus by Fang et al. (2000), but was moved to Parafaveoloolithus by Wang et al. (2011).
- P. pingxiangensis - This oospecies, first described by Zou et al. (2013), is quite distinct from the other Parafaveoloolithus oospecies because its shell is composed of several superimposed shell units. It was classified in Parafaveoloolithus because of the shell units assembling in the upper and middle portions of the shell. It is native to the Pingxiang basin of Jiangxi Province.
