= Los Charrúas =

Coordinates: 31°10′S 58°11′W

- Municipality and village
- Interactive map of Los Charrúas
- Country: Argentina
- Province: Entre Ríos Province
- Department: Concordia Department
- District: Suburbios

Government
  - Intendant: Ariel Panozzo Zenere (Partido Vecinal)

Population (2022)
  - Total: 3,862
- Time zone: UTC−3 (ART)
- Postal code: E3212

Los Charrúas is a village and municipality in Entre Ríos Province in north-eastern Argentina.

== History ==
Los Charrúas was founded thanks to the railway station (Los Charrúas Station) in the 1930s, with its layout approved by provincial resolution on October 23, 1941, the date taken as its founding date. The station was opened on January 24, 1934.

Its population is characterized by a melting pot of races and religious diversity. Its growth follows agricultural production.

A monument to the Charrúa warrior was inaugurated in 1991, to commemorate the fiftieth anniversary of the village's founding.
