= San José Formation, Uruguay =

Geologic formation in Uruguay

San José Formation
- Stratigraphic range: Montehermosan-Ensenadan; ~6.8–0.8 Ma
- Type: Geological formation

Location
- Country: Uruguay

Type section
- Named for: San José, Uruguay
- San José Formation, Uruguay

The San José Formation is a Montehermosan-Ensenadan geologic formation in Uruguay.

== Fossil content ==
The following fossils have been reported from the formation:

Mammals

- Catonyx tarijensis
- Charruatoxodon uruguayensis
- Josephoartigasia magna

Birds

- Giganhinga kiyuensis

== See also ==
- List of fossiliferous stratigraphic units in Uruguay

== Bibliography ==
- H. G. McDonald and D. Perea. 2002. The large Scelidothere Catonyx tarijensis (Xenarthra, Mylodontidae) from the Pleistocene of Uruguay. Journal of Vertebrate Paleontology 22(3):677-683
- A. Mones. 1988. Notas Paleontologicas Uruguayas, IV. Nuevos Registros de Mamiferos Fosiles de la Formacion San Jose (Plioceno-Pleistoceno Inferior) (Mammalia: Xenartha; Artiodactyla; Rodentia). Comunicaciones Paleontologicas del Museo de Historia Natural de Montevideo 1(20):255-270
