= Elipsoideichnus =

Elipsoideichnus Temporal range: Paleogene

Scientific classification
- Ichnofamily: †Celliformidae
- Ichnogenus: †Elipsoideichnus; Roselli, 1987

Type species
- †Elipsoideichnus meyeri

Ichnogenus of insect trace fossils

Elipsoideichnus is a trace fossil representing a bee nest. It was first described in 1987 by Francisco Lucas Roselli, who found it in the Asencio Formation of Uruguay. Later on it was also found in Argentina, near Colón, Entre Ríos. Its only species so far is Elipsoideichnus meyeri.
