= List of fossiliferous stratigraphic units in Uruguay =

Fossiliferous stratigraphic units in Uruguay
Lujanian
San José Formation
Raigón Formation
Huayquerian
Fray Bentos Formation
Asencio Formation
Mercedes Formation
Guichón Formation
Tacuarembó Formation
Buena Vista Formation
Mangrullo Formation
San Gregorio Formation
Cordobés Formation

This is a list of fossiliferous stratigraphic units in Uruguay.

== List of fossiliferous stratigraphic units ==
Group	Formation	Member	Period	Notes
	Sopas Formation		Lujanian	
	Libertad Formation		Lujanian	
	Dolores Formation		Lujanian	
	San José Formation		Montehermosan-Ensenadan	
	Raigón Formation		Huayquerian-Montehermosan	
	Kiyu Formation		Huayquerian	(Note: In later research considered part of the Camacho Formation)
	Camacho Formation	San Pedro	Huayquerian	
	Fray Bentos Formation		Deseadan	
	Asencio Formation	Del Palacio	Campanian-Maastrichtian	
	Mercedes Formation		Senonian	
Paysandú	Guichón Formation		Aptian-Santonian	
	Tacuarembó Formation	Batoví	Kimmeridgian	
	Buena Vista Formation		Late Triassic	
Cerro Largo	Mangrullo Formation		Sakmarian-Artinskian	
Itararé	San Gregorio Formation		Asselian	
Durazno	Cordobés Formation		Pragian-Emsian	

== See also ==
- Geology of Uruguay
- South American land mammal ages
- Gomphothere fossils in Uruguay
- List of fossiliferous stratigraphic units in Namibia

== Notes and references ==
=== Bibliography ===
- Alvarenga, Herculano; Jones, Washington William; Rinderknecht, Andrés (2010), "The youngest record of phorusrhacid birds (Aves, Phorusrhacidae) from the late Pleistocene of Uruguay", Neues Jahrbuch für Geologie und Paläontologie - Abhandlungen, 256 (2): 229–234, doi:10.1127/0077-7749/2010/0052
- Alberdi, María Teresa; Prado, José Luis; Perea, Daniel; Ubilla, Martín (2007), "Stegomastodon waringi (Mammalia, Proboscidea) from the Late Pleistocene of northeastern Uruguay", Neues Jahrbuch für Geologie und Paläontologie - Abhandlungen, 243 (2): 179–189, doi:10.1127/0077-7749/2007/0243-0179
- Gutiérrez, Mercedes; Prado, José Luis; Perea, Daniel; Ubilla, Martín (2005), "Late Pleistocene Stegomastodon (Mammalia, Proboscidea) from Uruguay", Neues Jahrbuch für Geologie und Paläontologie - Monatshefte, 2005 (11): 641–662, doi:10.1127/njgpm/2005/2005/641
- Verde, Mariano (2002), Icnología de la formación Camacho (Mioceno tardío) del Uruguay (MSc. thesis) (PDF), Universidad de la República, pp. 1–125
