= Colonia Ayuí =

Coordinates: 31°12′20″S 58°02′01″W

- Municipality and village
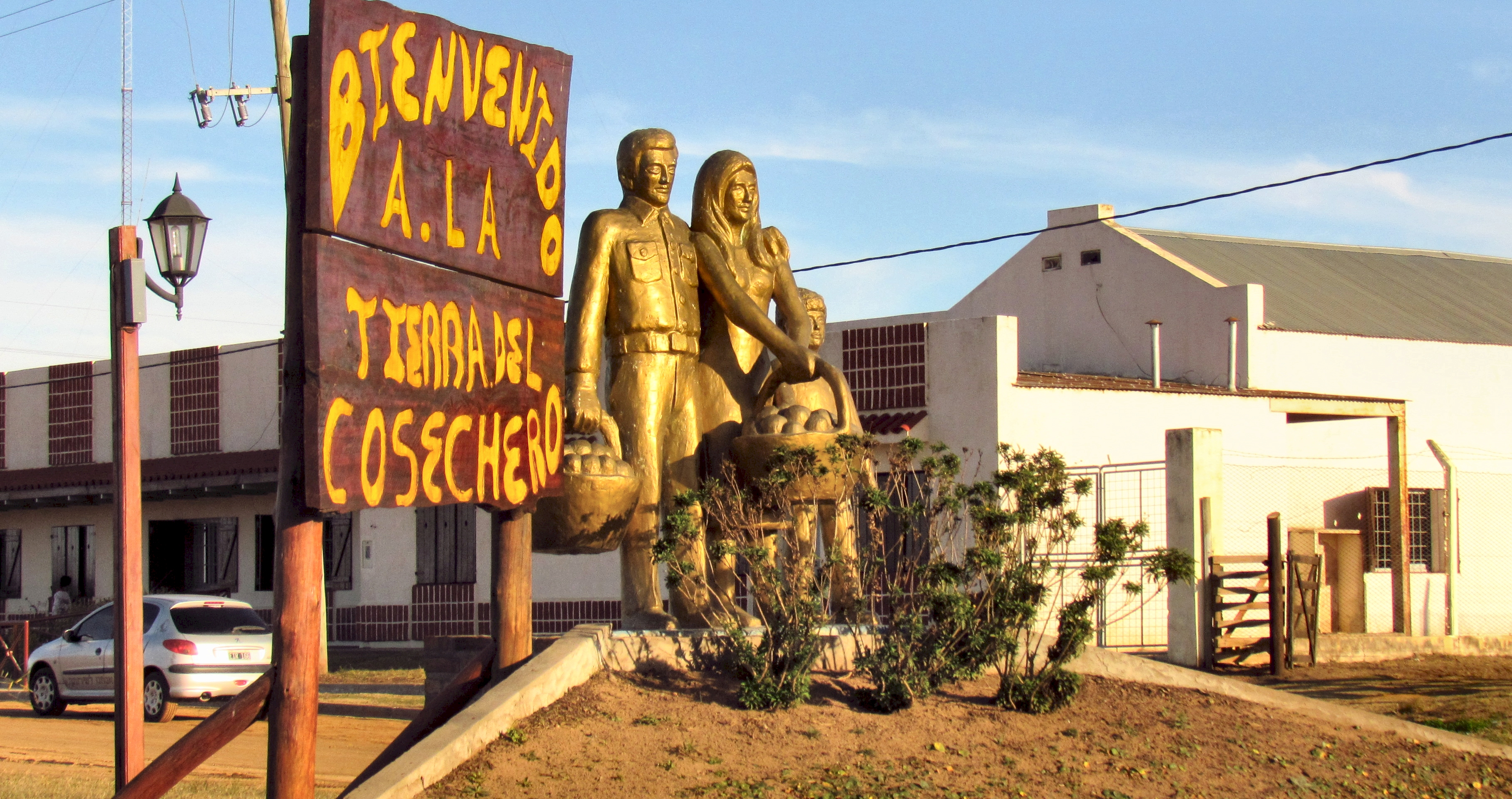
- Interactive map of Colonia Ayuí
- Country: Argentina
- Province: Entre Ríos Province
- Time zone: UTC−3 (ART)

Colonia Ayuí is a village and municipality in Entre Ríos Province in north-eastern Argentina.
