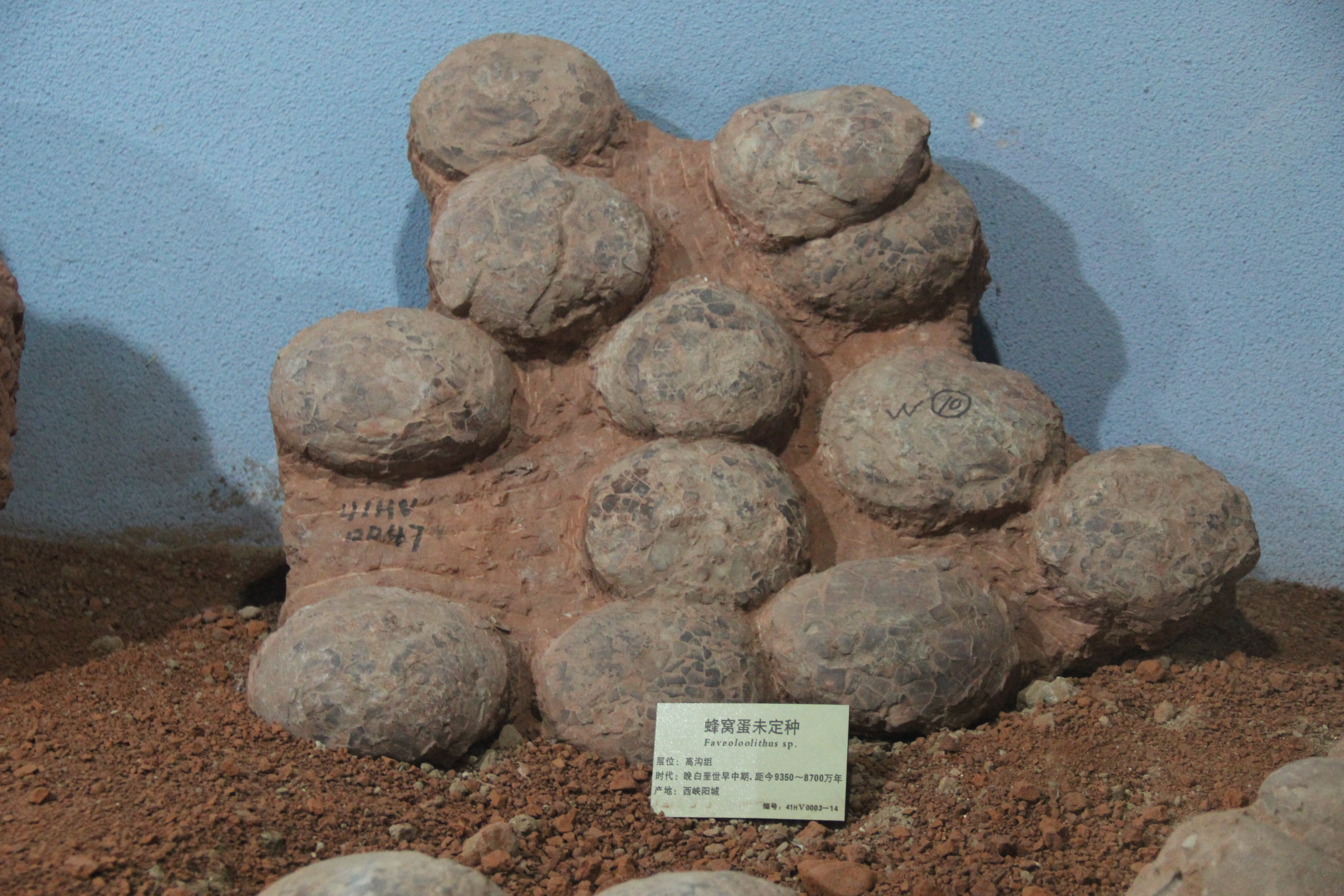
- Faveoloolithus sp. eggs, Henan Geological Museum

Egg fossil classification
- Basic shell type: †Dinosauroid-spherulitic
- Oofamily: †Faveoloolithidae

Oogenera
- †Faveoloolithus; †Hemifaveoloolithus; †Parafaveoloolithus; †Sphaerovum

= Faveoloolithidae =

Faveoloolithidae Temporal range: Turonian-Maastrichtian ~84–65 Ma

Oofamily of dinosaur eggs

Faveoloolithidae is an oofamily of dinosaur eggs. It contains Faveoloolithus, Hemifaveoloolithus, Parafaveoloolithus, and probably Sphaerovum. However, unlike the other Faveoloolthids, Sphaerovum has compactituberculate ornamentation more similar to megaloolithids. Like Dictyoolithidae, the membrane and the calcareous part of the eggshell formed simultaneously instead of forming the membrane before the calcareous like modern birds.

== See also ==
- List of dinosaur oogenera
