= Mercedes Formation, Uruguay =

Mesozoic geologic formation of Uruguay

Mercedes Formation
- Stratigraphic range: Campanian-Maastrichtian; ~84–66 Ma
- Type: Geological formation
- Underlies: Asencio Formation
- Overlies: Guichón Formation

Lithology
- Primary: Sandstone

Location
- Coordinates: 33.4°S 58.3°W
- Approximate paleocoordinates: 37.3°S 41.4°W
- Region: Río Negro & Soriano Departments
- Country: Uruguay
- Extent: Norte Basin

Type section
- Named for: Mercedes, Uruguay
- Mercedes Formation, Uruguay (Uruguay)

The Mercedes Formation is a Late Cretaceous (Campanian to Maastrichtian) geologic formation of the Norte Basin in Uruguay. Ichnofossils (such as Teisseirei, Uruguay and Monesichnus) and fossil dinosaur eggs have been reported from the formation. The formation that reaches a thickness of about 100 metres (330 ft), overlies the Guichón Formation and is overlain by the Asencio Formation.

== See also ==
- List of dinosaur-bearing rock formations
  - List of stratigraphic units with dinosaur trace fossils
    - Dinosaur eggs
- List of fossiliferous stratigraphic units in Uruguay
