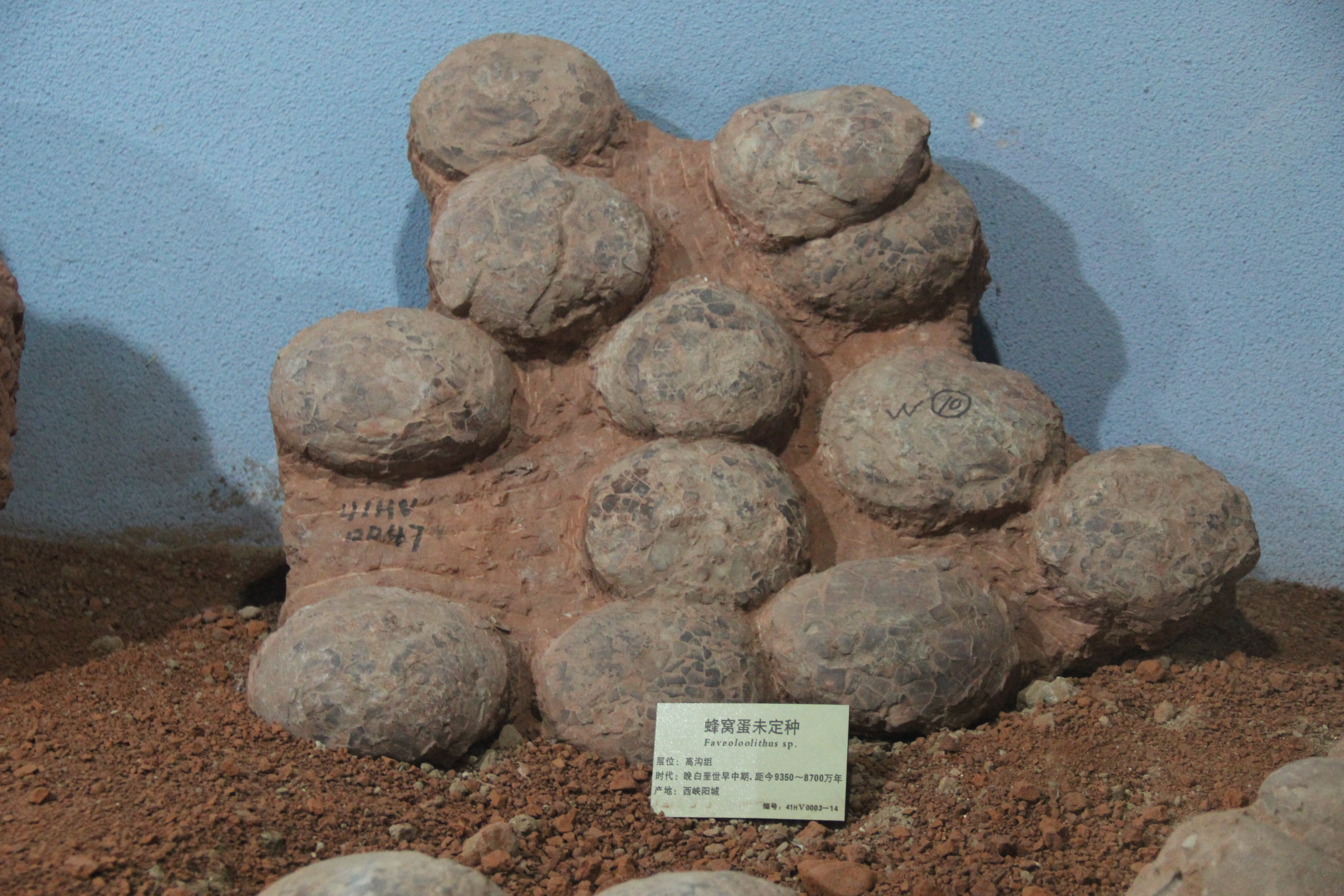
- Faveoloolithus sp. eggs, Henan Geological Museum

Egg fossil classification
- Basic shell type: †Dinosauroid-spherulitic
- Oofamily: †Faveoloolithidae
- Oogenus: †Faveoloolithus; Zhao & Ding, 1976

Oospecies
- F. ningxiaensis; F. zhangi

= Faveoolithus =

Faveoolithus Temporal range: Turonian-Campanian ~84–72 Ma

Dinosaur egg

Faveoolithus is an oogenus of dinosaur egg. The oogenus contains two oospecies, F. ningxiaensis and F. zhangi.

== Distribution ==
Fossil eggs of Faveoolithus have been found in:

- Chahanaobao and the Turonian Gaogou Formation, China
- Campanian Barun Goyot Formation, Mongolia
- Santonian Seonso Conglomerate, South Korea

== See also ==
- List of dinosaur oogenera
