= Jorge Fernando Genise =

Argentinian paleontologist and entomologist

- Citizenship: Argentine
- Scientific career
- Fields: paleontology, entomology, ichnology
- Author abbrev. (zoology): Genise

Jorge Fernando Genise is an Argentine palaeontologist and entomologist, specializing in ichnology. He has described several species of trace fossils in the Southern Cone.

He was active at the Bernardino Rivadavia Natural Sciences Argentine Museum, nowadays at the Consejo Nacional de Investigaciones Científicas y Técnicas.
