= Asencio Formation =

Geological formation in Uruguay

- Stratigraphic range: Campanian-Maastrichtian; ~83.6–66.0 Ma
- Type: Geological formation
- Sub-units: Del Palacio Member
- Underlies: Queguay & Fray Bentos Formations
- Overlies: Mercedes Formation

Lithology
- Primary: Sandstone

Location
- Coordinates: 33.0°S 57.2°W
- Approximate paleocoordinates: 36.6°S 41.6°W
- Region: Colonia, Río Negro, Soriano, Tacuarembó
- Country: Uruguay
- Extent: Paraná Basin

Type section
- Named for: Cry of Asencio
- Asencio Formation (Uruguay)

The Asencio Formation is a geological formation in the Paraná Basin of southwestern Uruguay whose strata date back to the Late Cretaceous (Campanian-Maastrichtian). Dinosaur remains are among the fossils that have been recovered from the formation.

== Vertebrate paleofauna ==
- Neuquensaurus australis
- Laplatasaurus araukanicus
- Antarctosaurus wichmannianus

=== Fossil eggs ===
- Sphaerovum erbeni
- Tacuarembovum oblongum

== Trace fossils ==
- Teisseirei
- Elipsoideichnus meyeri
- Corimbatichnus

== See also ==
- List of dinosaur-bearing rock formations
- List of fossiliferous stratigraphic units in Uruguay
- Adamantina Formation
- Allen Formation
- Marília Formation
