= 1961 in aviation =

This is a list of aviation-related events from 1961.

== Events ==
- During the year, Aeropostal Alas de Venezuela (LAV) introduces the Douglas DC-8 into service to replace its Lockheed Super Constellations.

=== January ===
- January 1
  - East Germany establishes its national civil aviation authority, the Hauptverwaltung der Zivilen Luftfahrt (Central Administration for Civil Aviation).
  - Two hijackers commandeer a Cubana de Aviación Bristol Britannia 318 after it departs Havana, Cuba, and force it to fly them to New York City.
- January 3 – Aero Flight 311, a Douglas DC-3C (registration OH-LCC) of the Finnish airline Aero, crashes near Kvevlax (Koivulahti) on approach to Vaasa Airport in Finland killing all 25 people on board. An investigation determines pilot error to be the cause of crash, finding that the captain and first officer were both exhausted for lack of sleep and were intoxicated at the time of the crash. It remains the deadliest air disaster to have occurred in Finland.
- January 12 – At the Air Force Flight Test Center at Edwards Air Force Base, California, the crew of a United States Air Force Strategic Air Command B-58 Hustler led by Major E. J. Deutschendorf – the father of singer-songwriter John Denver – breaks six world records in a single flight, including five held by the Soviet Union. The B-58 sets a new world speed record for a flight carrying a 2,000-kilogram (4,409-pound) payload over a 2,000-kilometer (1,200-mile) course, achieving an average speed of 1,061.808 mph (1,708.814 km/h). The flight also breaks the world speed records for average speed over the same distance carrying a 1,000-kilogram (1,610-pound) payload and carrying no payload and smashes the previous records for the distance in all three payload categories, which had been held by Soviet Tupolev Tu-104s flying at about half the average speed the B-58 achieves. The flight also sets a new record for average speed over a 1,000-km (621 mph) course, averaging 1,200 mph (1,900 km/h).
- January 14 – At the Air Force Flight Test Center at Edwards Air Force Base, California, a U.S. Air Force Strategic Air Command B-58 Hustler sets a new world speed record for a flight carrying a 2,000-kilogram (4,409-pound) payload over a 1,000-kilometer (620-mile) course, averaging 1,284.73 mph (2,067.57 km/h). The flight also breaks the world speed records for average speed over the same distance carrying a 1,000-kilogram (1,610-pound) payload and carrying no payload. On February 28, the crew will receive the Thompson Trophy for the flight.
- January 24 – A United States Air Force B-52G Stratofortress carrying two Mark 39 nuclear bombs breaks up in mid-air over Faro, North Carolina, and crashes, killing three of its eight-man crew. The bombs do not arm themselves and one bomb is recovered. Travelling at over 700 miles per hour (1,100 km/h), the second bomb lands in a swamp and buries itself to a depth of over 75 feet (23 meters); flooding prevents its recovery.

=== February ===
- February 1 – Trans-Canada Air Lines becomes the first sustained operator of the Vickers Vanguard.
- February 3 – Operation Looking Glass commences, giving the United States Air Force′s Strategic Air Command a permanent, airborne command post.
- February 15 – Sabena Flight 548, a Boeing 707, crashes at Brussels, Belgium. All 72 aboard (including the entire 18-member United States Figure Skating team), as well as one person on the ground, are killed. It is the first fatal accident involving the Boeing 707 and the deadliest accident in the history of Sabena.

=== March ===
- March 7 – Flying a North American X-15, U.S. Air Force Major Robert M. White becomes the first pilot to exceed Mach 4.
- March 14 – A U.S. Air Force B-52F Stratofortress carrying two nuclear weapons crashes in Sutter County, California, west of Yuba City. The weapons do not arm and the eight-man crew ejects safely, although a firefighter responding to the crash is killed and several people are injured in a road accident.
- March 28
  - Air Afrique is formed.
  - President John F. Kennedy cancels the North American B-70 Valkyrie bomber program. The production order for B-70s is cut to three (later reduced to two) XB-70A aircraft for experimental use in studying sustained flight at speeds of greater than Mach 3 and in the advanced study of aerodynamics, propulsion, and other subjects related to large supersonic transports.

=== April ===
- Seaboard & Western Airlines changes its name to Seaboard World Airlines.
- April 1
  - VIASA – the flag carrier of Venezuela – commences operations.
  - The United States Air Force redesignates its Air Research and Development Command as the Air Force Systems Command. It also redesignates the Air Materiel Command as the Air Force Logistics Command, with some of its functions transferred to the Air Force Systems Command.
- April 3 – In Chile's worst air disaster in history at the time, LAN Chile Flight 210, a Douglas DC-3 carrying 24 people, including eight members of the Chilean football (soccer) team Club de Deportes Green Cross, disappears over the Andes Mountains in Chile during a domestic flight from Osorno to Santiago. Its wreckage will remain undiscovered until February 2015.
- April 7 – Moisture condensing in a connector plug causes a GAR-8 Sidewinder air-to-air missile carried by a New Mexico Air National Guard F-100A Super Sabre of the 188th Fighter Interceptor Squadron to fire accidentally while the F-100A is practicing bomber interception tactics against the U.S. Air Force B-52B Stratofortress Ciudad Juarez of the Strategic Air Command's 95th Bombardment Wing. The missile blows off the B-52B's port wing, and the bomber crashes on Mount Taylor in New Mexico, killing three members of its crew.
- April 12 – Soviet cosmonaut Yuri Gagarin makes the first human spaceflight, orbiting the Earth once in 108 minutes in Vostok 1.
- April 15 – In Operation Puma, eight Douglas B-26B Invaders painted in Cuban Air Force markings manned by anti-Castro Cuban exiles of the Fuerza Aérea de Liberación ("Liberation Air Force") fly from Puerto Cabezas, Nicaragua, to attack airfields at San Antonio de los Baños and Ciudad Libertad, Cuba, and Antonio Maceo Airport at Santiago de Cuba. They destroy a mixture of Cuban Air Force aircraft – a C-47 Skytrain, a PBY Catalina, five B-26 Invaders, a Hawker Sea Fury, a T-33 Shooting Star, and two P-47 Thunderbolts, among others – and a number of civilian aircraft, including a Douglas DC-3. One attacking B-26 is shot down by antiaircraft fire at Havana and its crew is lost; two B-26s land in Florida, and one in the Cayman Islands and are not returned to the Cuban exiles.
- April 17 – Anti-Castro Cuban exiles invade Cuba at the Bay of Pigs. Five C-46 Commandos and one C-54 Skymaster drop a battaltion of their paratroopers into Cuba, losing one C-46, and later parachute supplies to exile troops ashore, while the remaining B-26 Invader bombers of their Fuerza Aérea de Liberación – some flown by Central Intelligence Agency contractors and personnel of the Alabama Air National Guard – provide close air support near the beachhead. The invading exiles shoot down two Cuban Sea Furies and two Cuban B-26 Invaders with antiaircraft fire. The Cuban Air Force has only six operational aircraft, but two of its Hawker Sea Furies sink two of the exiles' five ships and drive off the rest and its only two jets – T-33 Shooting Star trainers – shoot down four Fuerza Aérea de Liberación B-26 Invaders. The exiles' B-26s and C-54s continue to support the beachhead the following day. United States Navy ships supporting the exiles include the anti-submarine warfare carrier USS Essex (CVS-9) and the helicopter assault carrier USS Boxer (LPH-4), and the attack aircraft carrier USS Shangri-La (CVA-38) is active near the Cayman Islands, but their aircraft see no combat, limiting their activities to combat air patrol, reconnaissance, and search and rescue flights.
- April 19 – Six A4D-2 Skyhawk attack aircraft from Attack Squadron 34 (VA-34) aboard USS Essex fly a combat air patrol over the exiles' beachhead at the Bay of Pigs, to protect Fuerza Aérea de Liberación B-26 Invaders providing close air support there, but a mix-up over time zones leads two of the B-26s – manned by Central Intelligence Agency contractor personnel – to arrive after the Skyhawks have departed; they are shot down by two Cuban T-33 Shooting Stars, with their crews killed. The exiles in the beachhead surrender later in the day. The Cuban Air Force has suffered four aircraft shot down and at least five destroyed on the ground during the invasion, while the exiles have lost seven B-26 Invaders with the loss of 10 Cubans and four Americans aboard them, and one C-46 and its crew.
- April 24 – The Tupolev Tu-114 airliner makes its first passenger flight, a domestic Aeroflot flight in the Soviet Union from Moscow's Vnukovo Airport to Khabarovsk.

=== May ===
- May 1 – The first hijacking of an American airliner – and first aircraft hijacking inside the United States – takes place, when Antulio Ramirez Ortiz, flying under the pseudonym "Elpirata Cofresi" – a reference to Puerto Rican pirate Roberto Cofresí – and armed with a gun and a steak knife, commandeers National Airlines Flight 337, a Convair CV-440 bound from Miami International Airport in Miami, Florida, to Key West, Florida, with 10 people on board. He explains that the president of the Dominican Republic, Rafael Trujillo, has offered him US$100,000 to assassinate President of Cuba Fidel Castro, and that he must fly to Havana, Cuba, to warn Castro. It is the first time that an American airliner has been forced to fly to Cuba, and surprised and confused Cuban air traffic controllers at first threaten to have the plane shot down if it enters Cuban airspace, but they eventually allow it to land at a military base outside Havana. Ortiz receives political asylum in Cuba.
- May 3 – The Boeing Airplane Company changes its name to Boeing Company.
- May 4 – United States Navy Commander Malcolm Ross and Lieutenant Commander Victor A. Prather set a new world balloon altitude record while testing pressure suits, ascending to 113,740 feet (34,670 meters) over the Gulf of Mexico in a helium balloon before making a planned landing at sea. A helicopter retrieves Ross from the water and transports him safely to the anti-submarine warfare carrier USS Antietam (CVS-36), but Prather subsequently slips from a helicopter's sling and drowns after his pressure suit floods.
- May 10 – A United States Air Force B-58 Hustler sets a record for sustained supersonic flight, flying 669.4 miles (1,077.3 km) in 30 minutes 45 seconds at an average speed of 1,302 miles per hour (1,132 knots; 2,097 km/h). Its pilot, Major Elmer E. Murphy, will receive the Aéro-Club de France′s Blériot Cup for the flight.

Air France Flight 406 a Lockheed L-1649 Starliner is destroyed by a bomb in-flight over the Sahara Desert near Debdeb, Algeria, killing all 78 on board.

- May 18 – In Operation Sageburner, a United States Navy McDonnell F4H-1F Phantom II fighter (BuNo. 145316) is destroyed trying to set the low-altitude speed record, the aircraft coming apart at high speed due to a pitch bellows failure which causes a pilot-induced oscillation (PIO).
- May 22 or 24 – To celebrate the 50th anniversary of naval aviation in the United States, five United States Navy McDonnell F4H-1F Phantom II fighters fly across the United States in less than three hours in Operation LANA. The fastest, flown by Lieutenants Richard F. Gordon, Jr., (pilot) and Bobbie Long (radar intercept officer), sets a new record for a transcontinental flight across the United States, flying from Ontario, California, to Floyd Bennett Field in New York City in 2 hours 47 minutes at an average speed of 869.74 mph (1,399.71 km/h) with three in-flight refuelings. They receive the 1961 Bendix Trophy for their flight.
- May 26 – A U.S. Air Force B-58 Hustler flies from New York City to Paris in a record 3 hours, 19 minutes, 41 seconds, covering the 4,612-mile (7,427-km) distance at an average speed of 1,386 miles per hour (1,205 knots; 2,232 km/h). Its crew will receive the Mackay Trophy for the flight.
- May 30 – Viasa Flight 897, a Douglas DC-8-53, crashes in the Atlantic Ocean during a flight from Lisbon, Portugal, to Santa Maria Island in the Azores, killing all 61 people on board.

=== June ===
- Northwest Orient Airlines begins using Boeing 720s between the continental United States and Hawaii.
- June 1 – United Air Lines absorbs Capital Airlines, completing a merger announced in July 1960. The largest airline merger in history at the tine, it makes United the largest airline in the Western world, with a fleet of 267 aircraft.
- June 6 – Air Congo is founded as the national airline of the Republic of the Congo (Léopoldville).
- June 12 – KLM Flight 823, a Lockheed L-188 Electra, crashes on approach to Cairo International Airport in Egypt, killing 20 of the 36 people on board and injuring all 16 survivors.
- June 15 – El Al sets a world record for the longest non-stop commercial flight when one of its Boeing 707 airliners flies from New York City to Tel Aviv, covering 5,760 miles (9,270 kilometres) in 9 hours 33 minutes.
- June 21–22 – A Royal Air Force Avro Vulcan makes the first non-stop flight from England to Australia.
- June 23 – U.S. Air Force Major Robert M. White becomes the first pilot to achieve hypersonic – speeds higher than Mach 5 – flight, reaching Mach 5.27 3,603 mph (5,798 km/h) in North American X-15 56-6671.
- June 29 – Air Congo begins flight operations.

=== July ===
- July 1 – The Royal Air Force deploys Hawker Hunter combat aircraft to reinforce Kuwait, which is under threat from Iraq. Simultaneously it deploys Canberras and Valiant aircraft to Malta.
- July 3 – Fourteen hijackers commandeer a Cubana de Aviación Douglas DC-3 on a domestic flight in Cuba from Havana to Varadero and force it to fly them to Miami, Florida.
- July 11 – United Airlines Flight 859, a Douglas DC-8, strikes several ground vehicles and catches fire while landing at Stapleton International Airport in Denver, Colorado. Of the 122 people on board, 18 are killed and 84 injured. One person on the ground also dies.
- July 12 – Flying at Vnukovo in the Soviet Union, a Tupolev Tu-114 (NATO reporting name "Cleat") airliner piloted by Ivan Sukhomlin and copiloted by Piotr Soldatov sets a world altitude record for a turboprop landplane carrying a payload of between 25,000 and 30,000 kg (55,000 and 66,000 lb), reaching 12,073 meters (39,610 feet).
- July 19
  - Trans World Airlines becomes the first airline to show regularly scheduled movies during its flights, presenting By Love Possessed to first-class passengers.
  - Aerolíneas Argentinas Flight 644, a Douglas DC-6, encounters severe turbulence during climbout 30 minutes after takeoff from Buenos Aires, Argentina, and crashes 12 km (7.5 mi) west of Pardo, Buenos Aires, killing all 67 people on board.
- July 21 – Alaska Airlines Flight 779, a Douglas DC-6 cargo plane operating under contract to the United States Air Force′s Military Air Transport Service, strikes an embankment just before landing at Shemya Air Force Base on Shemya in the Aleutian Islands in Alaska and crashes, killing the entire crew of six.
- July 24
  - A hijacker commandeers Eastern Air Lines Flight 202, a Lockheed L-188 Electra bound from Miami to Tampa, Florida, with 38 people on board and forces it to fly to Havana, Cuba. A United States Air Force fighter aircraft from Homestead Air Force Base, Florida, tails the airliner until it enters Cuban airspace.
  - Deliveries of the McDonnell CF-101 Voodoo to the Royal Canadian Air Force commence.
- July 31 – As Pacific Air Lines Flight 327 – a Douglas DC-3 – prepares for departure at Chico Airport in Chico, California, for a flight to San Francisco, California, a drunken man, 40-year-old Bruce Britt, runs across the tarmac and enters the plane without showing a ticket. He pulls out a .38-caliber revolver and shoots a ticket agent in the back, wounding him, then fires two more shots in the airliner's cabin before the pilots admit him to the cockpit. He says he wants to be flown to Smackover, Arkansas, to see his estranged wife and demands that the pilot take off. When the pilot refuses to do so until the cockpit door is closed, Britt shoots him in the face, blinding him for life. The copilot then disarms him and subdues him with the help of three passengers.

=== August ===
- August 3 – Armed with handguns, Leon Bearden – a convicted bank robber with many financial and psychological problems who wishes to present Cuba′s leader Fidel Castro with a Boeing 707 and make a fresh start in Cuba – and his 16-year-old son Cody hijack Continental Airlines Flight 54, a Boeing 707-124 (registration N70775) with 73 people on board while it is flying from Phoenix, Arizona, to El Paso, Texas, where the Beardens release all the passengers except for four who volunteer to remain aboard as hostages. Under orders from President John F. Kennedy to prevent the airliner from leaving Texas, the Federal Bureau of Investigation and Continental Airlines make sure that refueling the plane faces endless delays, until Leon Bearden fires a shot and orders the flight crew to take off. Federal agents spray the plane with machine gun fire as it begins to roll, shredding its tires and disabling one of its engines. An FBI negotiator then boards the plane and subdues the Beardens.
- August 4 – The United States Senate holds an emergency hearing on the recent outbreak of aircraft hijackings in the United States. Asked whether the Federal Aviation Administration (FAA) had considered searching all airline passengers before boarding, FAA head Najeeb Halaby rejects the idea as impractical, saying "Can you imagine the line that would form from the ticket counter in Miami if everyone had to submit to police inspections?"
- August 9
  - The British Eagle Vickers 610 Viking 3B Lord Rodney, carrying a crew of three and taking 34 boys from a London school and two of their masters to a camping holiday crashes at Holta in Strand Municipality (Norway), killing all 39 people on board. It is the deadliest aviation accident in Norwegian history at the time.
  - Armed with a revolver, Albert Charles Cadon hijacks Pan American World Airways Flight 501 – a Douglas DC-8 flying from Mexico City, Mexico, to Guatemala City, Guatemala, with 81 people on board – and forces it to fly him to Havana, Cuba, as a protest against the failure of the United States Government to support the independence movement in French Algeria.
  - Five hijackers attempt to take control of a Cubana de Aviación Curtiss C-46 Commando about five minutes after it takes off from Havana with 53 people on board for a flight to Nueva Gerona, Cuba. Two guards aboard try to stop them, and the pilot, a guard, and a hijacker die in an exchange of gunfire. The copilot then makes an emergency landing in a sugar cane field near Havana, during which the airliner's landing gear collapses, and the four surviving hijackers flee.
- August 10 – The United States Senate votes 92–0 in favor of a bill making airplane hijacking a crime punishable by death.
- August 13 – A Curtiss C-46F transport plane operated by the CIA's Air America airline suffers a mechanical problem and crashes near Pha Khao in Laos, killing all 5 crew members on board while they were on a mission to drop supplies for General Vang Pao's Hmong army.
- August 15 – Beagle Aircraft's first completely original design – the B.206X, an early prototype of the Beagle Basset – flies for the first time.
- August 16 – The British Overseas Airways Corporation (BOAC) sells its ownership stake in Middle East Airlines.
- August 21 – A Canadian Pacific Air Lines Douglas DC-8 sets two world records during a single test flight. First, it reaches 50,000 feet (15,000 meters) at a weight of 107,600 pounds (48,800 kg), a new altitude record for a loaded transport jet. Then, in a dive from that altitude, it reaches Mach 1.012 with a true air speed of 662.5 mph (1,066.2 km/h) at an altitude of 39,614 feet (12,074 meters), becoming the first airliner to break the sound barrier.
- August 28 – In Operation Sageburner, a United States Navy McDonnell F4H-1F Phantom II fighter (BuNo. 145307) sets a low-altitude speed record, averaging 902.769 mph (1,452.866 km/h) over a 3-mile (4.82-km) course flying below 125 feet (38 meters) at all times.
- August 29 – A French military aircraft clips a cable of the aerial tramway connecting Pointe Helbronner and the Aiguille du Midi in the French Alps. Three cars of the tramway fall, killing five people. The pilot lands his plane safely.
- August 31
  - Tunisair takes delivery of its first jet airliner, a Sud Aviation Caravelle III.
  - Chance Vought Incorporated and Ling-Temco Electronics merge to form Ling-Temco-Vought, Inc.

=== September ===
- September 1 – Trans World Airlines Flight 529, a Lockheed L-049 Constellation, crashes near Hinsdale, Illinois, shortly after takeoff from Midway Airport in Chicago, Illinois, killing all 78 people on board after a bolt works free, causing an elevator failure, the aircraft to pitch up, stall and part of the horizontal stabilizer to detach. It is the deadliest single-aircraft aviation accident in American history at the time.
- September 5 – President of the United States John F. Kennedy signs legislation making aircraft hijacking a federal crime in the United States.
- September 10 – President Airlines (a US supplemental air carrier) DC-6B N90773 taking off from Shannon Airport on its way to Gander Airport, en route from Duesseldorf to Chicago, made a steep left hand turn immediately after takeoff (a right hand turn had been cleared), with bank angle reaching 90 degrees before it crashed into the River Shannon. Probable cause was either a defective artificial horizon or possible defective right hand aileron. Crew fatigue may also have played a role. All 77 passengers and 6 crew perished.
- September 12
  - The experimental V/STOL Hawker Siddeley P.1127 makes its first transitions from vertical to horizontal flight and back, using thrust vectoring.
  - Air France Flight 2005, a Sud Aviation Caravelle, crashes 8.4 km (5.2 mi) short of the runway while on approach to land in bad weather at Rabat-Salé Airport in Morocco, killing all 77 people on board.
- September 14 – Two West German Air Force F-84F Thunderstreak fighters stray off course into East German airspace. Pursued by a large number of Soviet Air Force fighters, the two West German planes manage to evade them in heavy cloud cover and land in West Berlin unharmed.
- September 17 – Due to a maintenance error, Northwest Orient Airlines Flight 706, a Lockheed L-188 Electra, crashes on takeoff from O'Hare International Airport in Chicago, Illinois, killing all 37 people on board.
- September 18 – On approach to Ndola Airport in Ndola in the Federation of Rhodesia and Nyasaland, a United Nations Douglas DC-6B (registration SE-BDY) strikes trees at 4,357 feet (1,328 meters) above sea level and crashes in the jungle, killing all 16 people on board including Secretary General of the United Nations Dag Hammarskjöld. At the time, it is the deadliest aviation accident ever to have taken place in what would later become Zambia.
- September 23 – A Turkish Airlines Fokker F27 Friendship 100 crashes into the hill Karanlıktepe in Ankara Province while on approach to Esenboğa Airport in Ankara, Turkey, killing 28 of the 29 people on board.
- September 24 – During an air show at Wilmington, North Carolina, a United States Air Force C-123 Provider carrying members of the United States Army Parachute Team (the Golden Knights) crashes on take-off and burns. Three of the 15 servicemen on board die.

=== October ===
- Prompted by the dissolution of the United Arab Republic, Syria ends its association with United Arab Airlines (the future EgyptAir), and a new Syrian airline, Syrian Arab Airways, begins operating the route network that its predecessor Syrian Airways had operated before its March 1958 merger into United Arab Airlines.
- Tunisair inaugurates service between Tunis, Tunisia, and Frankfurt-am-Main, West Germany.
- October 7 – The Derby Aviation Douglas Dakota IV G-AMSW crashes on Pic de Canigou in the Catalan Pyrenees in southern France, killing all 34 people on board.
- October 30 – Accompanied by a Tupolev Tu-16 (NATO reporting name "Badger') equipped to take films and air samples, a Soviet Air Force Tupolev Tu-95V (NATO reporting name "Bear") piloted by Major Andrei Durnovtsev drops the 50-megaton Tsar Bomba hydrogen bomb – the most powerful nuclear device ever detonated – from an altitude of 10,500 meters (34,400 feet) over Novaya Zemlya in the Arctic Ocean. Although a parachute slows the bomb's descent to allow the Tu-16 and Tu-95V, modified to accommodate the bomb – which weights 27 metric tons and is 8 meters (26¼ feet) long and 2.1 meters (6.9 feet) in diameter – by the removal of its bomb bay doors and fuselage fuel tanks, to fly 45 kilometers (28 miles) from the release point before the bomb detonates at an altitude of 4,000 meters (13,000 feet), their crews are given only a 50 percent chance of survival. They do survive the blast, but the shock wave from the explosion forces the Tu-95V to drop 1,000 meters (3,300 feet).

=== November ===
- The United States Air Force begins its Farm Gate counterinsurgency training mission in South Vietnam, teaching Republic of Vietnam Air Force personnel at Bien Hoa Air Base to fly T-28 Trojan trainer aircraft.
- November 1 – The first Hawker Siddeley 748 to be built in India flies for the first time. It has been assembled at Kanpur by the Indian Air Force's Aircraft Manufacturing Depot as India seeks to replace its fleet of Douglas Dakotas.
- November 8 – The crew of Imperial Airlines Flight 201/8, a Lockheed L-1049 Constellation chartered by the US Army to carry new recruits to Columbia, South Carolina, for training, mishandles fuel flow problems to the starboard engines, crashing after attempting an emergency landing at Byrd Field in Richmond, Virginia. Although all 79 people on board survive the impact, all but the captain and flight engineer die of carbon monoxide poisoning after they are trapped in the fuselage during a post-crash fire. The incident results in significant changes in the US airline industry.
- November 9
  - A North American X-15 flown by U.S. Air Force test pilot Major Robert M. White becomes the first airplane to exceed Mach 6, achieving Mach 6.04 (4,094 mph, 6,593 km/h) at an altitude of 102,000 feet (31,090 meters) during a flight of under 8 minutes between Mud Lake, Nevada, and Edwards Air Force Base, California.
  - Flying the SUMPAC (Southampton University Man-Powered Aircraft) at Lasham Airfield in Hampshire, England, Derek Piggott makes the first officially documented takeoff and landing in a human-powered aircraft. During the flight – which also is the first flight of the SUMPAC – Piggott covers a distance of 70 yards (64 meters) and reaches an altitude of 6 feet (1.8 meters).
- November 10 – Six opponents of Prime Minister of Portugal António de Oliveira Salazar hijack a TAP Portugal Lockheed L-1049G Super Constellation with 39 people on board during a flight from Casablanca, Morocco, to Lisbon, Portugal, and force it to circle over Lisbon while they drop propaganda leaflets urging the Portuguese people to revolt against Salazar. They then force the airliner's crew to fly them to Tangier, Morocco.
- November 14 – A Zantop Air Transport Douglas DC-4 cargo aircraft on final approach to Greater Cincinnati Airport in Hebron, Kentucky, crashes in a wooded area near the airport. Two of the three-man crew are injured.
- November 22
  - The first aircraft carrier designed as such to be completed in France, Clemenceau, is completed at the Brest Arsenal at Brest.
  - In Operation Skyburner, United States Marine Corps Lieutenant Colonel Robert B. "Bob" Robertson sets a new world absolute speed record for a non-rocket-powered aircraft of 1,606.3 mph (2,585.1 km/h) in a McDonnell F4H-1 Phantom II.
- November 23 – Aerolíneas Argentinas Flight 322, a de Havilland DH 106 Comet 4, strikes eucalyptus trees immediately after takeoff from Viracopos-Campinas International Airport in Campinas, Brazil, and crashes. Its fuel tanks explode, and all 52 people on board die.
- November 25 – The United States Navy commissions its first nuclear-powered aircraft carrier, USS Enterprise (CVA(N)-65).
- November 27 – Five armed students hijack an Avensa Douglas DC-6B with 43 people on board during a domestic flight in Venezuela from Caracas to Maracaibo and force it to circle over Caracas while they drop anti-government propaganda leaflets over the city. They then force the airliner's crew to fly them to Curaçao in the Netherlands Antilles.
- November 30 – Ansett-ANA Flight 325, a Vickers Viscount Type 720, crashes into Botany Bay just after takeoff from Sydney, Australia, killing all 15 people on board.

=== December ===
- December 5 – A U.S. Navy McDonnell F4H-1 Phantom II sets a sustained altitude record of 66,443.8 feet (20,252.1 meters).
- December 11 – The first American military aircraft are based in Vietnam, as the U.S. Army's 8th and 57th Transportation Companies (Light Helicopter), arrive at Saigon, South Vietnam. They are equipped with 32 H-21C Shawnee transport helicopters.
- December 22 – U.S. Army helicopters engage in their first combat operation in Vietnam as the 8th Transportation Company makes several airlfits of South Vietnamese ground troops to landing zones in South Vietnam south of Saigon.
- December 23 – In Operation Chopper, U.S. Army helicopters airlift 1,000 South Vietnamese paratroopers to attack a suspected Viet Cong headquarters in South Vietnam 10 miles (16 km) west of Saigon.

== First flights ==
- Champion Lancer

=== January ===
- January 24 – Convair 990
- January 26 - Fiat 7002

=== February ===
- February 15 - Victa R-2
- February 28 - Cessna 336 Skymaster

=== March ===
- March 4 - Armstrong Whitworth AW.660 Argosy - Argosy C.1 for RAF
- March 18 – Tupolev Tu-28
- March 28 - Stewart Headwind

=== April ===
- April 5 – Dassault Mirage IIIE
- April 16 – Beagle Airedale G-ARKE
- April 27 - Legrand-Simon LS.60
- April 29 - Potez 840 F-WJSH

=== May ===
- May 2 – Pilatus PC-6 Turbo-Porter

=== June ===
- June 1 - Breguet 941
- June 17 – HAL Marut
- June 21 – Aviation Traders Carvair G-ANYB
- June 22 – Beechcraft Queen Air Model 80

=== July ===
- July 11 – Lightning F.2, second production model of the English Electric Lightning
- July 16 – Hiller Ten99

=== August ===
- August 15 – Beagle B.206X, five-seat early prototype of the Beagle Basset
- August 16 – YUH-1D (Bell Model 205), prototype of the UH-1D Iroquois
- August 17 – Handley Page HP.115

=== September ===
- September 7 – PZL M-4 Tarpan
- September 9 – Bölkow Bo 103
- September 21 – Boeing CH-47 Chinook

=== October ===
- October 12 – Dassault Mirage IVA pre-series (second prototype)
- October 21 – Breguet Atlantic
- October 23 – Beech Model 23 Musketeer

=== November ===
- November 2 – Bensen B-12
- November 9 – SUMPAC (Southampton University Man-Powered Aircraft)
- November 16 – HMPAC Puffin

== Entered service ==
- Westland Wessex with the Royal Navy

=== April ===
- April 24 - Tupolev Tu-114 Rossiya (NATO reporting name "Cleat") with Aeroflot

=== June ===
- North American A3J-1 Vigilante (redesignated A-5A Vigilante in 1962) with United States Navy Heavy Attack Squadron 3 (VAH-3)

=== September ===
- Sikorsky HSS-2 Sea King (redesignated SH-3 Sea King in 1962) with United States Navy Antisubmarine Helicopter Squadrons 3 (HS-3) and 10 (HS-10)

=== October ===
- McDonnell F4H-1 Phantom II (redesignated F-4B Phantom II in 1962) with United States Navy Fighter Squadron 74 (VF-74)

== Retirements ==
- Hiller ROE Rotorcycle by the United States Marine Corps

== Deadliest crash ==
The deadliest crash of the year was the September 10 crash of a Douglas DC-6 operated by President Airlines which occurred shortly after the aircraft took off from Shannon Airport in Shannon, Ireland, all 83 on board were killed.
