= Aerolíneas Argentinas accidents and incidents =

Aviation safety incidents involving Aerolineas Argentinas

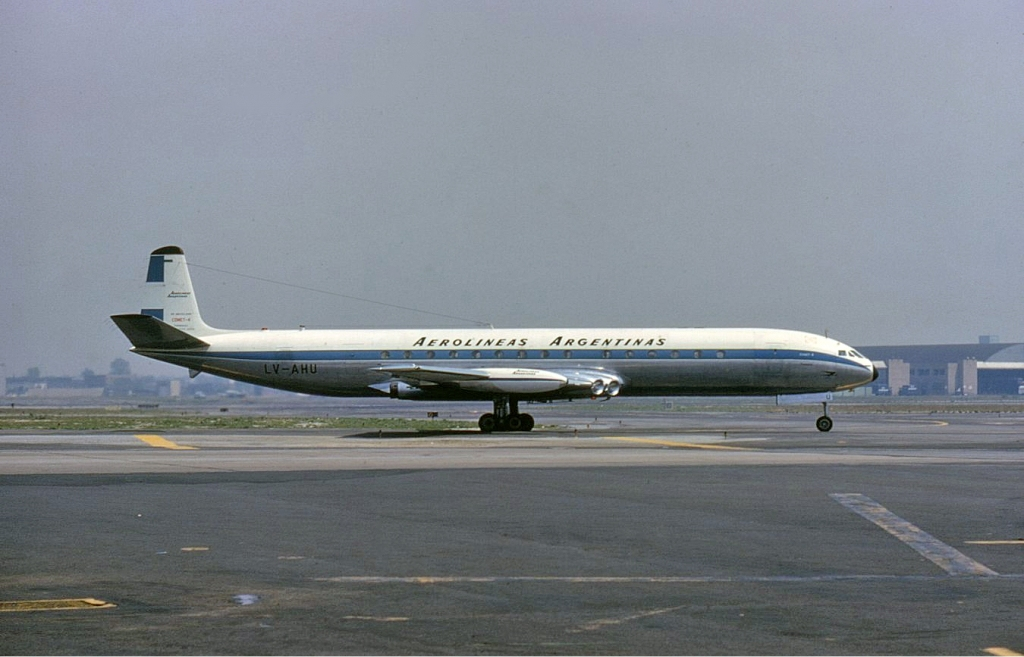
An Aerolíneas Argentinas Comet 4, similar to the one involved in the accident of Flight 322, occurred on 23 December 1961, is seen here at Idlewild Airport in 1965. The airline lost three of these aircraft between August 1959 and December 1961.

Aerolíneas Argentinas was established by the Argentine government in May 1949. Shortly after the carrier started revenue flights in December 1950 it experienced its first deadly accident, when a Douglas C-47A crashed en route to Buenos Aires from Mar del Plata, killing 17 of the 18 occupants.

Following is a list of accidents and incidents experienced by Aerolíneas Argentinas. According to the Aviation Safety Network, as of July 2011 there have been 12 deadly accidents, totalling 335 fatalities. The deadliest accident occurred in 1961, with a death toll of 67. The latest accident involving fatalities took place in 1970. The company ranks among the safest airlines in the world.

Aerolíneas Argentinas has written off 28 aircraft; nine Douglas C-47As, four Avro 748s, three Comet 4s, two Boeing 737s, two Douglas DC-6s, two Convair CV-240s, two Fokker F-28s, one Boeing 707, one Douglas DC-4, one Douglas C-54, and one McDonnell Douglas MD-88.

== List ==
Date	Location	Aircraft	Tail number	Aircraft damage	Fatalities	Description	Refs
12 June 1950	(Argentina) Buenos Aires	Douglas C-47A	LV-ACL	W/O	0	Overturned on landing at Ezeiza Airport.	
30 December 1950	(Argentina) Cobo	Douglas C-47A	LV-ACH	W/O	17/18	Crashed while en route a domestic scheduled Mar del Plata–Buenos Aires passenger service.	
26 March 1951	(Argentina) Río Grande	Douglas C-47A	LV-ACY	W/O	13	The aircraft had just departed from Río Grande Airport bound for Buenos Aires when it crashed. Eleven of twenty occupants aboard perished in the accident, plus 2 people on the ground.	
3 June 1951	(Argentina) Puerto Deseado	Douglas C-47A	LV-AGE	W/O	0	Overran the runway and came to rest into a ditch at Puerto Deseado Airport.	
21 June 1951	(Argentina) Puerto Deseado	Douglas C-47B	LV-ADG	Repaired	2	Overshoot the runway on landing at Puerto Deseado Airport and hit a military truck, killing two occupants and injuring other two. Everybody aboard the aircraft survived.	
17 June 1953	(Argentina) Córdoba	Douglas C-54A	LV-ABQ	W/O	0/41	Crash-landed 12 kilometres (7.5 mi) north of Córdoba while on approach to Pajas Blancas Airport, inbound from Salta on a domestic scheduled passenger service.	
23 April 1954	(Argentina) Sierra del Vilgo	Douglas C-47A	LV-ACX	W/O	25/25	The airplane was due to operate a domestic scheduled Córdoba–Mendoza route when crashed into mountainous terrain, within the La Rioja territory. After a diversion to La Rioja due to severe turbulence on the original flight path.	
16 October 1954	(Argentina) Capilla del Señor	CV-240	LV-ADQ	W/O	0/32	The aircraft was operating a scheduled Buenos Aires-Córdoba passenger service; bad weather forced it to land south-southwest of Capilla del Señor.	
20 May 1955	(Argentina) Río Gallegos	Douglas C-47A	LV-ACQ	W/O	0/5	A fire broke out when the aircraft failed to get airborne during take-off at Río Chico Airport. The aircraft was operating a cargo service.	
16 July 1956	(Argentina) Pavín	Douglas C-47A	LV-ACD	W/O	18/18	Crashed 5 kilometres (3.1 mi) north-east of Pavín, Córdoba Province, as it descended below the minimum prescribed altitude on approach to Río Cuarto Airport inbound from Buenos Aires.	
11 January 1957	(Argentina) Buenos Aires	Viking	Unknown	Unknown	18	Crashed.	
8 December 1957	(Argentina) Bolívar	DC-4	LV-AHZ	W/O	61/61	Flight 670 was bound for San Carlos de Bariloche Airport from Ministro Pistarini International Airport when it crashed en route 25 kilometres (16 mi) southeast of Bolívar, under extreme weather conditions.	
10 June 1958	(Brazil) Ilha Grande	DC-6	LV-ADV	W/O	0/22	Force-landed on a beach after the failure of two engines. The aircraft was operating a scheduled international Rio de Janeiro–Buenos Aires passenger service.	
15 May 1959	(Argentina) Mar del Plata	Douglas C-47A	LV-AFW	W/O	18/18	The aircraft was due to operate the second leg of a domestic scheduled Ministro Pistarini International Airport–Mar del Plata Airport–Comandante Espora Airport passenger service as Flight 672, when it crashed into the sea, 3 kilometres (1.9 mi) off the coast, shortly after takeoff.	
14 July 1959	(Argentina) Santiago del Estero	Douglas C-47A	LV-ACM	W/O	0/10	Belly landing.	
27 August 1959	(Paraguay) Asunción	Comet 4	LV-AHP	W/O	2/50	Crashed 9 kilometres (5.6 mi) away from Silvio Pettirossi International Airport, on final approach. A crew member and a passenger died.	
12 December 1959	(Argentina) Mendoza	CV-240	LV-ADM	W/O	0/32	A loss of hydraulic pressure prompted the flightcrew to return to El Plumerillo Airport. On its way back to the airport, the aircraft force-landed in a vineyard near Mendoza.	
20 February 1960	(Argentina) Buenos Aires	Comet 4	LV-AHO	W/O	0/6	Hard landing at Ezeiza Airport during a training flight.	
7 September 1960	(Uruguay) Salto	DC-6	LV-ADS	W/O	31/31	The aircraft was operating a scheduled Asunción–Buenos Aires service as Flight 205 when it suddenly crashed in a field, 12 kilometres (7.5 mi) east-northeast of Salto.	
19 July 1961	(Argentina) Pardo	DC-6	LV-ADW	W/O	67/67	Broke up and crashed 12 kilometres (7.5 mi) west of Pardo, Buenos Aires, because of severe turbulence encountered during climbout. Due to operate a scheduled Buenos Aires–Comodoro Rivadavia domestic passenger service as Flight 644. The accident remains the deadliest one in the carrier's history.	
23 November 1961	(Brazil) Campinas	Comet 4	LV-AHR	W/O	52/52	Collided with eucalyptus trees during initial climbout just after it departed from Viracopos-Campinas International Airport, and crashed. The aircraft was operating an international scheduled Buenos Aires–Campinas–Port of Spain–New York City passenger service as Flight 322.	
28 September 1966	(Falkland Islands) Stanley	DC-4	LV-AGG	Repaired	0/50	Bound for Río Gallegos from Buenos Aires, Flight 648 was hijacked by 19 extremists that intended to carry out a symbolical invasion to the Falkland Islands. Peronist militants masterminded the hijacking under the name "Operativo Cóndor" (English: Operation Condor). The aircraft was diverted and forced to land at the Stanley racecourse. Members of the Royal Marines as well as civilians were taken as hostages. The hijackers surrendered to a priest the next day, were sent back to Argentina, and imprisoned.	
15 July 1969	(Argentina) Bahía Blanca	HS-748 Srs. 1	LV-IEV	W/O	0/39	Touched down off the runway in bad visibility at Comandante Espora Airport.	
27 November 1969	(Argentina) Santa Rosa	HS-748 Srs. 1	LV-HHI	W/O	0/28	Ended up in a paddock when it landed 3 kilometres (1.9 mi) short of the runway threshold at Santa Rosa Airport.	
4 February 1970	(Argentina) Loma Alta	HS-748 Srs. 1	LV-HGW	W/O	37/37	The aircraft was operating a scheduled Asunción–Formosa–Corrientes–Rosario–Buenos Aires-Aeroparque passenger service as Flight 707 when it crashed into the ground near Loma Alta, Chaco, while on its third leg, after the pilots lost control of the aircraft during severe turbulence due to a thunderstorm.	
19 December 1970	(Argentina) Sarmiento	HS-748 Srs. 1	LV-HHH	W/O	0	Unknown	
15 November 1975	(Argentina) Concordia	F28-1000	LV-LOB	W/O	0/60	Hit trees on approach to Concordia Airport inbound from Buenos Aires, 4 kilometres (2.5 mi) short of the runway. The crew managed to land the aircraft safely, but the nose gear and the fuselage resulted damaged beyond economical repair.	
20 February 1981	(United States) New York	Boeing 707-387B	Unknown	None	0/58	On February 20, 1981, Flight 342, operated by a Boeing 707-387B, nearly hit the transmitting antenna of the North Tower of the World Trade Center in New York during its approach to John F. Kennedy International Airport. The air traffic controller's intervention avoided the impact with less than 90 seconds of distance between the aircraft and the North Tower.	
27 January 1986	(Argentina) Buenos Aires	Boeing 707-320C	LV-JGR	W/O	0/5	Overran the runway on landing in poor weather at Ezeiza Airport. The aircraft was completing a São Paulo–Buenos Aires freighter service.	
26 September 1988	(Argentina) Ushuaia	Boeing 737-200	LV-LIU	W/O	0/62	Flight 648 was a domestic scheduled Buenos Aires–Bahía Blanca–Río Grande–Ushuaia passenger service that landed at the final destination airport with excessive speed, veered off the runway, slid down a slope for 2 metres (6 ft 7 in), and came into rest in shallow waters.	
5 January 1990	(Argentina) Villa Gesell	F28-4000	LV-MZD	W/O	0/90	Destroyed by fire following a runway overrun after an over fast touchdown. The aircraft was completing a scheduled Buenos Aires to Villa Gesell passenger service.	
14 February 1992	(United States) Los Angeles	Boeing 747-200B	Unknown	None	1/356	Shrimp contaminated with cholera was distributed on Flight 386, which was bound to Los Angeles from Buenos Aires via Lima. One of the passengers died from the illness.	
20 November 1992 (Note: A discrepancy exists on whether the incident occurred on 20 November, or 21 November.)	(Argentina) San Luis	Boeing 737-200C	LV-JNE	W/O	0/113	Overran the runway when it aborted takeoff following the burst of a tyre at the San Luis Airport, catching fire. Due to operate a scheduled San Luis–Buenos Aires passenger service as Flight 8524.	
24 February 1999	(Argentina) Buenos Aires	MD-88	LV-VBY	W/O	0	Destroyed by hangar fire at Aeroparque Jorge Newbery.	
