= Flight 670 =

Flight 670 may refer to two aircraft crashes:

- Aerolineas Argentinas Flight 670 (1957, Argentina) — a DC-4 was flown into extreme weather
- Loganair Flight 670A (2001, Scotland) - ditching of a Short 360 in Firth of Forth
- Atlantic Airways Flight 670 (2006, Norway) — spoilers on a BAe 146 failed
