= Concordia, Entre Ríos =

Concordia San Antonio de Padua de la Concordia
- City
- Skyline Bartolomé Mitre Park San Carlos Castle

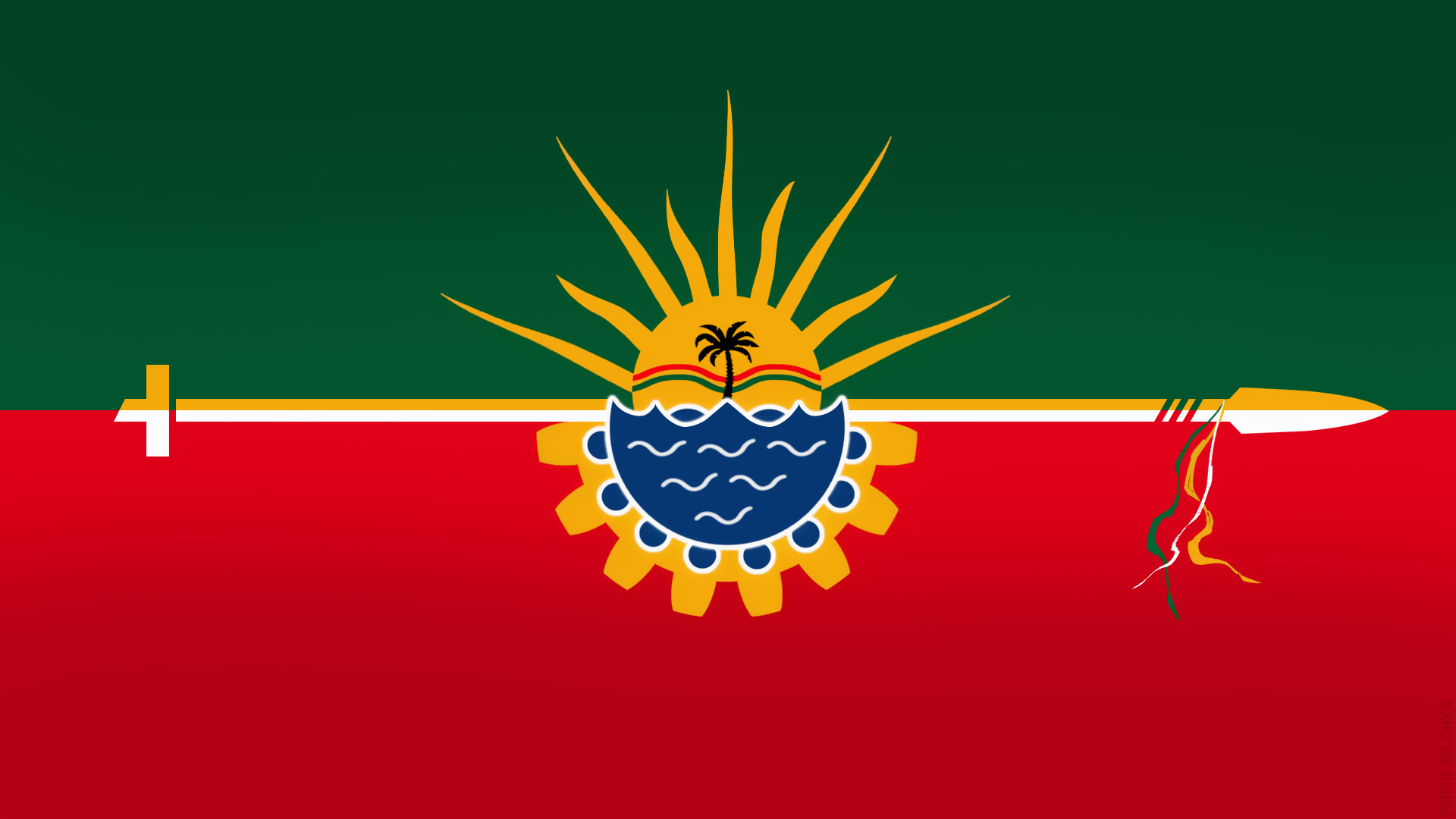
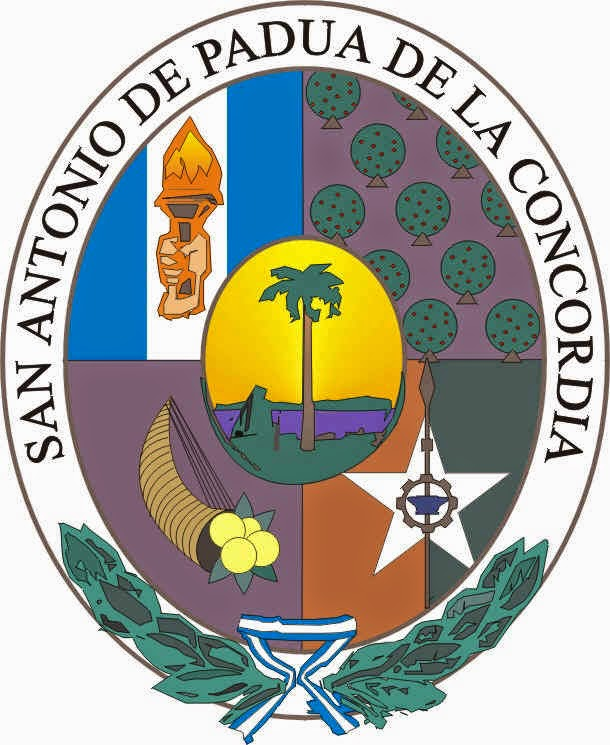
- Flag Coat of arms

- Location of Concordia in Argentina
- Coordinates: 31°24′S 58°2′W
- Country: Argentina
- Province: Entre Ríos
- Department: Concordia
- Founded: November 29, 1831
- Founder: Mariano José del Castillo

Government
  - Intendant: Francisco Azcué (UCR)

Area
  - Total: 3,259 km^{2} (1,258 sq mi)
- Elevation: 31 m (102 ft)

Population (2022 census)
  - Total: 179,203
  - Density: 54.99/km^{2} (142.4/sq mi)
- Demonym: concordiense
- Time zone: UTC−3 (ART)
- CPA base: E3200
- Dialing code: +54 345
- Website: Official website

Concordia, officially San Antonio de Padua de la Concordia, is a city and municipality that is the head town of the Concordia department, Entre Ríos Province, located in the Argentine Mesopotamia. It has 179,203 inhabitants according to the 2022 census [INDEC], making it the second largest in its province, and the 24th largest in Argentina.

== History ==
The area was inhabited by the Charrúas and the Yaro people when the Spanish had arrived.

The city was founded in November 1831.

== Geography ==
Concordia lies on the right-hand (western) shore of the Uruguay River, opposite the city of Salto in Uruguay. The two cities are joined by a road/railway link that is part of the Salto Grande Dam complex (starting on the Argentine side 18 km north from the center of Concordia). It is located approximately 430 km north of Buenos Aires.

=== Climate ===
According to the Köppen climate classification, Concordia has a humid subtropical climate (Cfa). Mean monthly temperatures range from 12.5 °C (54.5 °F) in July, the coldest month, to 25.3 °C (78 °F) in January, the warmest month. Concordia receives a mean annual precipitation of 1,372.9 mm (54 in). Fall (March to May) is the wettest season while winter (June to August) is the driest season. However, there is great year to year variability in annual precipitation. The frost free period is 10 months long and in an average year, there are 8.6 days with frost.

Climate data for Concordia, Entre Ríos (Comodoro Pierrestegui Airport) 1991–2020, extremes 1963–present)
Month	Jan	Feb	Mar	Apr	May	Jun	Jul	Aug	Sep	Oct	Nov	Dec	Year
Record high °C (°F)	42.1 (107.8)	41.8 (107.2)	38.7 (101.7)	35.8 (96.4)	32.5 (90.5)	30.4 (86.7)	32.0 (89.6)	35.6 (96.1)	37.2 (99.0)	37.4 (99.3)	38.7 (101.7)	40.7 (105.3)	42.1 (107.8)
Mean daily maximum °C (°F)	31.9 (89.4)	30.4 (86.7)	28.6 (83.5)	24.8 (76.6)	20.8 (69.4)	18.2 (64.8)	17.8 (64.0)	20.5 (68.9)	22.3 (72.1)	24.9 (76.8)	27.9 (82.2)	30.5 (86.9)	24.9 (76.8)
Daily mean °C (°F)	25.6 (78.1)	24.4 (75.9)	22.6 (72.7)	19.0 (66.2)	15.4 (59.7)	13.0 (55.4)	12.1 (53.8)	14.1 (57.4)	16.1 (61.0)	19.1 (66.4)	21.8 (71.2)	24.2 (75.6)	19.0 (66.2)
Mean daily minimum °C (°F)	19.5 (67.1)	18.9 (66.0)	17.2 (63.0)	14.0 (57.2)	10.9 (51.6)	8.5 (47.3)	7.4 (45.3)	8.7 (47.7)	10.5 (50.9)	13.5 (56.3)	15.6 (60.1)	17.9 (64.2)	13.6 (56.5)
Record low °C (°F)	8.6 (47.5)	7.4 (45.3)	3.2 (37.8)	−0.3 (31.5)	−2.7 (27.1)	−5.0 (23.0)	−5.2 (22.6)	−4.2 (24.4)	−3.0 (26.6)	0.9 (33.6)	3.1 (37.6)	4.9 (40.8)	−5.2 (22.6)
Average precipitation mm (inches)	140.1 (5.52)	152.7 (6.01)	136.4 (5.37)	173.2 (6.82)	111.5 (4.39)	86.3 (3.40)	55.3 (2.18)	74.8 (2.94)	89.6 (3.53)	161.6 (6.36)	134.6 (5.30)	151.9 (5.98)	1,468 (57.80)
Average precipitation days (≥ 0.1 mm)	7.8	8.0	8.0	8.7	7.9	7.3	6.3	6.3	7.2	9.6	7.4	8.2	92.6
Average relative humidity (%)	65.4	70.6	73.2	77.3	81.5	81.6	78.5	73.7	71.6	71.7	66.3	64.6	73.0
Mean monthly sunshine hours	232.5	211.9	204.6	162.0	133.3	105.0	127.1	161.2	150.0	198.4	222.0	210.8	2,118.8
Mean daily sunshine hours	7.5	7.5	6.6	5.4	4.3	3.5	4.1	5.2	5.0	6.4	7.4	6.8	5.8
Source: Servicio Meteorológico Nacional

Climate data for Concordia INTA (1967–2016)
Month	Jan	Feb	Mar	Apr	May	Jun	Jul	Aug	Sep	Oct	Nov	Dec	Year
Record high °C (°F)	41.4 (106.5)	41.3 (106.3)	40.2 (104.4)	35.1 (95.2)	33.2 (91.8)	30.9 (87.6)	31.9 (89.4)	35.7 (96.3)	38.3 (100.9)	38.5 (101.3)	39.2 (102.6)	41.4 (106.5)	41.4 (106.5)
Mean daily maximum °C (°F)	31.9 (89.4)	30.3 (86.5)	28.3 (82.9)	24.5 (76.1)	20.8 (69.4)	17.8 (64.0)	18.0 (64.4)	20.0 (68.0)	21.8 (71.2)	24.7 (76.5)	27.5 (81.5)	30.5 (86.9)	24.8 (76.6)
Daily mean °C (°F)	25.3 (77.5)	24.2 (75.6)	22.3 (72.1)	18.7 (65.7)	15.5 (59.9)	12.6 (54.7)	12.5 (54.5)	14.0 (57.2)	15.7 (60.3)	18.6 (65.5)	21.1 (70.0)	23.9 (75.0)	18.7 (65.7)
Mean daily minimum °C (°F)	18.8 (65.8)	18.3 (64.9)	16.2 (61.2)	12.9 (55.2)	10.0 (50.0)	7.5 (45.5)	7.1 (44.8)	8.0 (46.4)	9.5 (49.1)	12.6 (54.7)	14.7 (58.5)	17.2 (63.0)	12.8 (55.0)
Record low °C (°F)	8.4 (47.1)	6.8 (44.2)	5.5 (41.9)	−0.4 (31.3)	−2.9 (26.8)	−5.1 (22.8)	−4.8 (23.4)	−4.2 (24.4)	−2.4 (27.7)	−0.4 (31.3)	2.4 (36.3)	6.0 (42.8)	−5.1 (22.8)
Average precipitation mm (inches)	128.0 (5.04)	148.5 (5.85)	140.8 (5.54)	146.5 (5.77)	105.2 (4.14)	79.5 (3.13)	61.7 (2.43)	70.2 (2.76)	96.7 (3.81)	141.7 (5.58)	135.8 (5.35)	127.0 (5.00)	1,372.9 (54.05)
Average relative humidity (%)	67.5	74.1	76.0	78.8	82.8	82.9	81.3	76.9	73.5	72.9	69.9	66.0	75.2
Mean monthly sunshine hours	288.3	228.8	238.7	201.0	170.5	144.0	167.4	186.0	201.0	232.5	261.0	285.2	2,604.4
Mean daily sunshine hours	9.3	8.1	7.7	6.7	5.5	4.8	5.4	6.0	6.7	7.5	8.7	9.2	7.1
Percentage possible sunshine	66.3	60.9	62.8	58.9	52.3	46.8	52.2	54.2	56.4	58.3	63.1	65.0	58.1
Source: Instituto Nacional de Tecnología Agropecuaria

=== Nature ===
The city is known as the national capital of citrus production. El Palmar National Park, an important reserve for Yatay palm trees, lies 60 km south of the city.

=== Floods ===
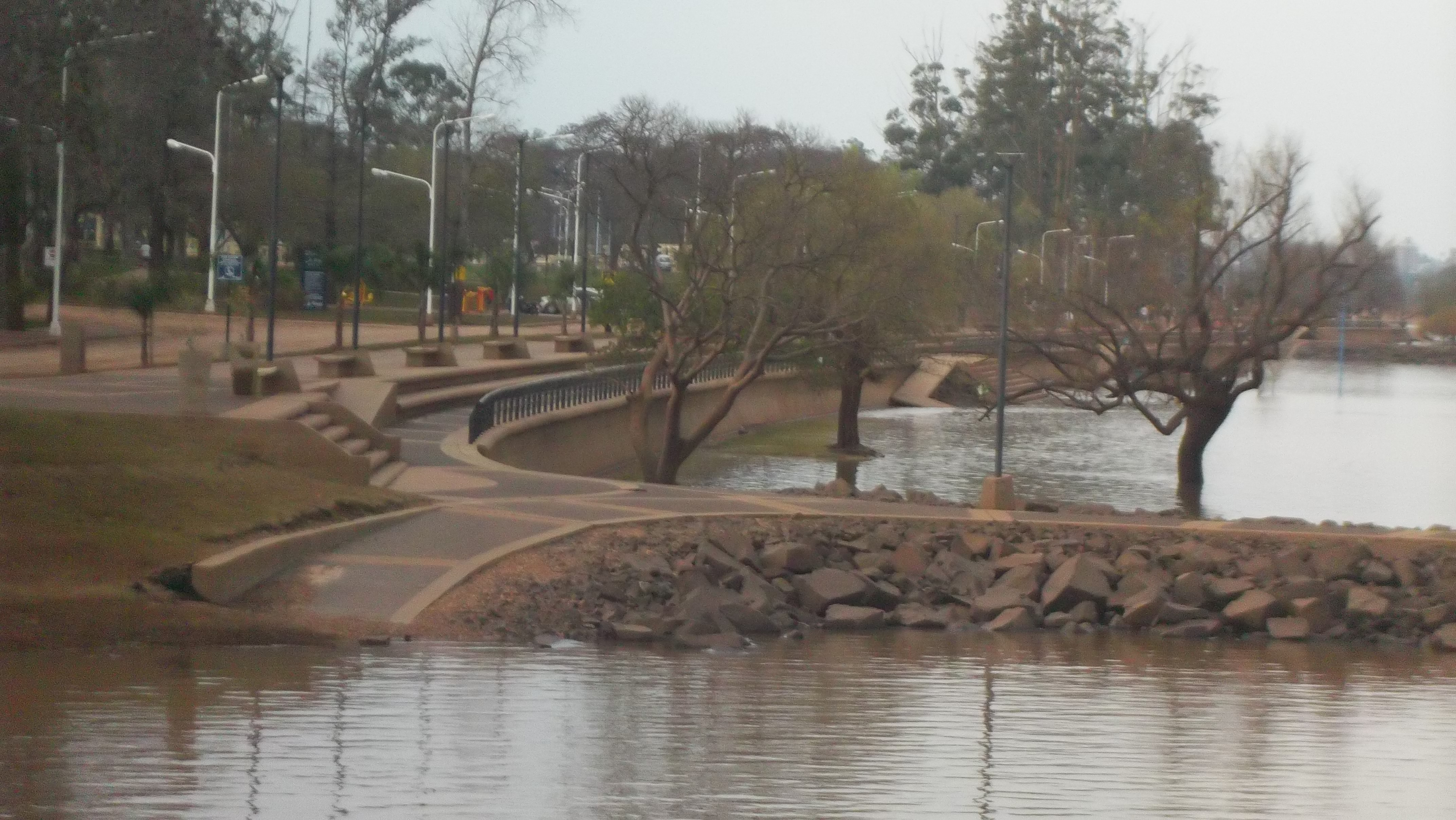
Flooded riverfront (2015)

Like most settlements by the Uruguay River, Concordia suffers from intense floods. In 2015, a major flood left around 20,000 residents evacuated from the city.

== Demographics ==
Urban area

As of 2022, Concordia has a population of 179,203 inhabitants. Over half of them live under the poverty line, this being the third highest percentage in Argentina, after Resistencia and Formosa.

According to the 2022 census, 2,577 residents of Concordia identify as Indigenous, and 1,524 as Afro-Argentine.

Year	Population
2022	179,203
2010	152,282
2001	157,291
1991	138,980
1980	123,190
1970	110,401
1960	99,666
1947	86,766
1914	41,134

== Transport ==
The area is served by an airport (IATA: COC, ICAO: SAAC) located at 31°18′S 58°0′W.

The airport was rebuilt and finished by March 31, 2025. It reopened in September 2025, after being under construction since 2022.

== Notable people ==
- Isidoro Blaisten (1933–2004), journalist
- Gustavo Ruiz Díaz (b. 1981), footballer
- Isaac Ganón (1916–1975), sociologist
- Celestino Piaggio (1886–1931), pianist, conductor, and composer
- Isabel Sarli (1929–2019), actress and model
- Joaquin Szuchman (born 1995), Israeli-Argentine basketball player in the Israeli Basketball Premier League

== Gallery ==
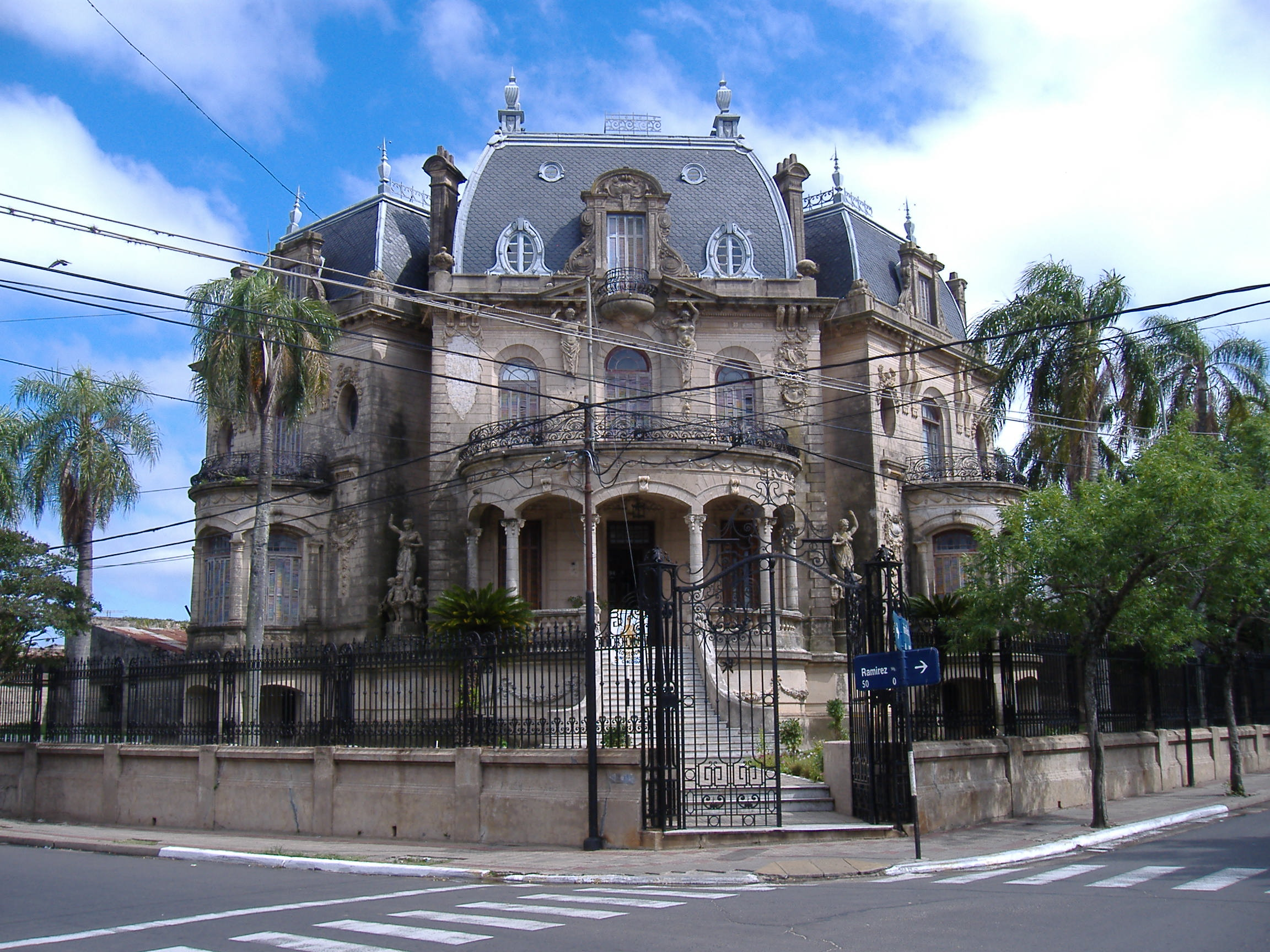
Concordia's most architecturally significant residence, the Arruabarrena house

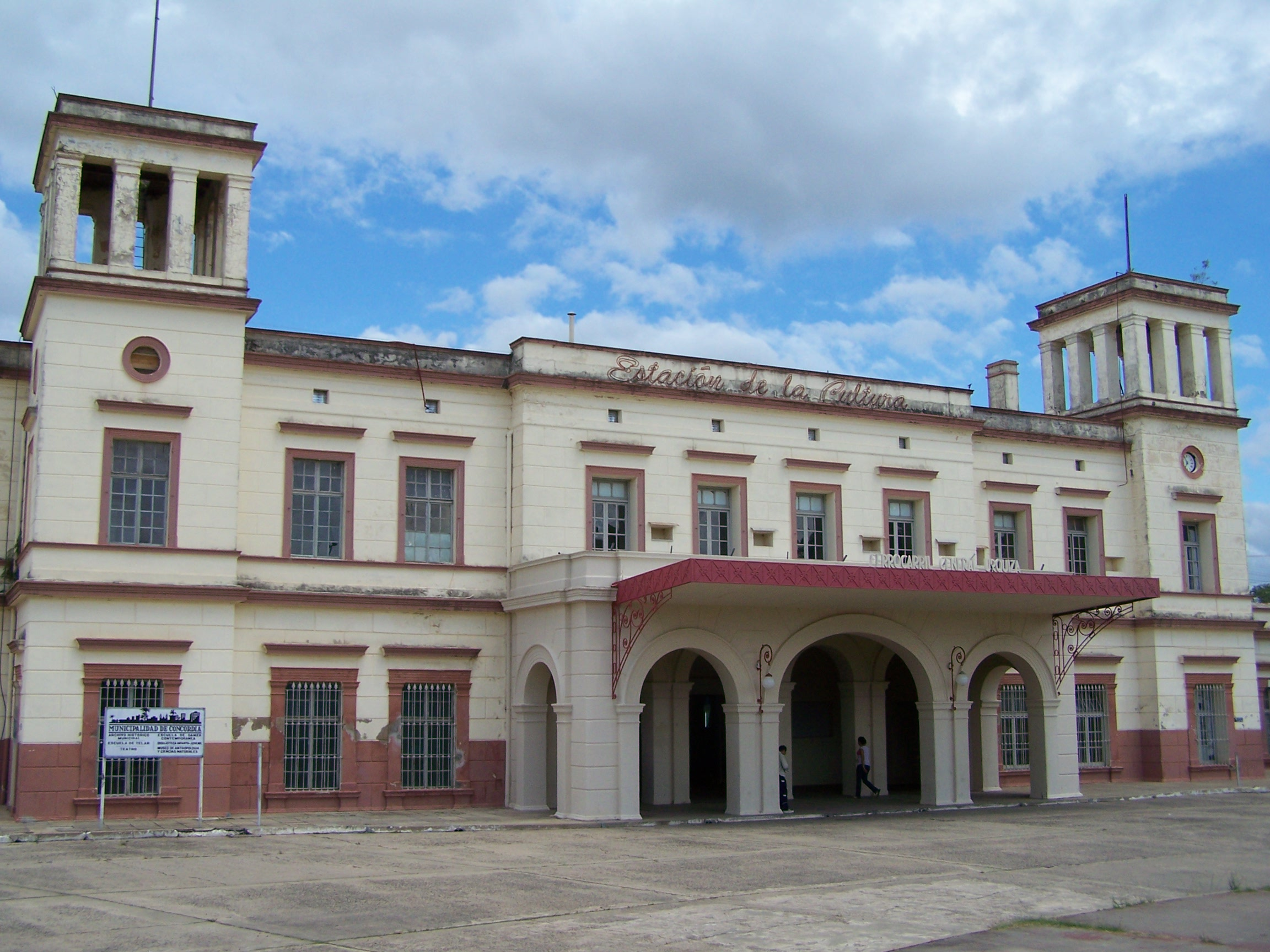
Former train station

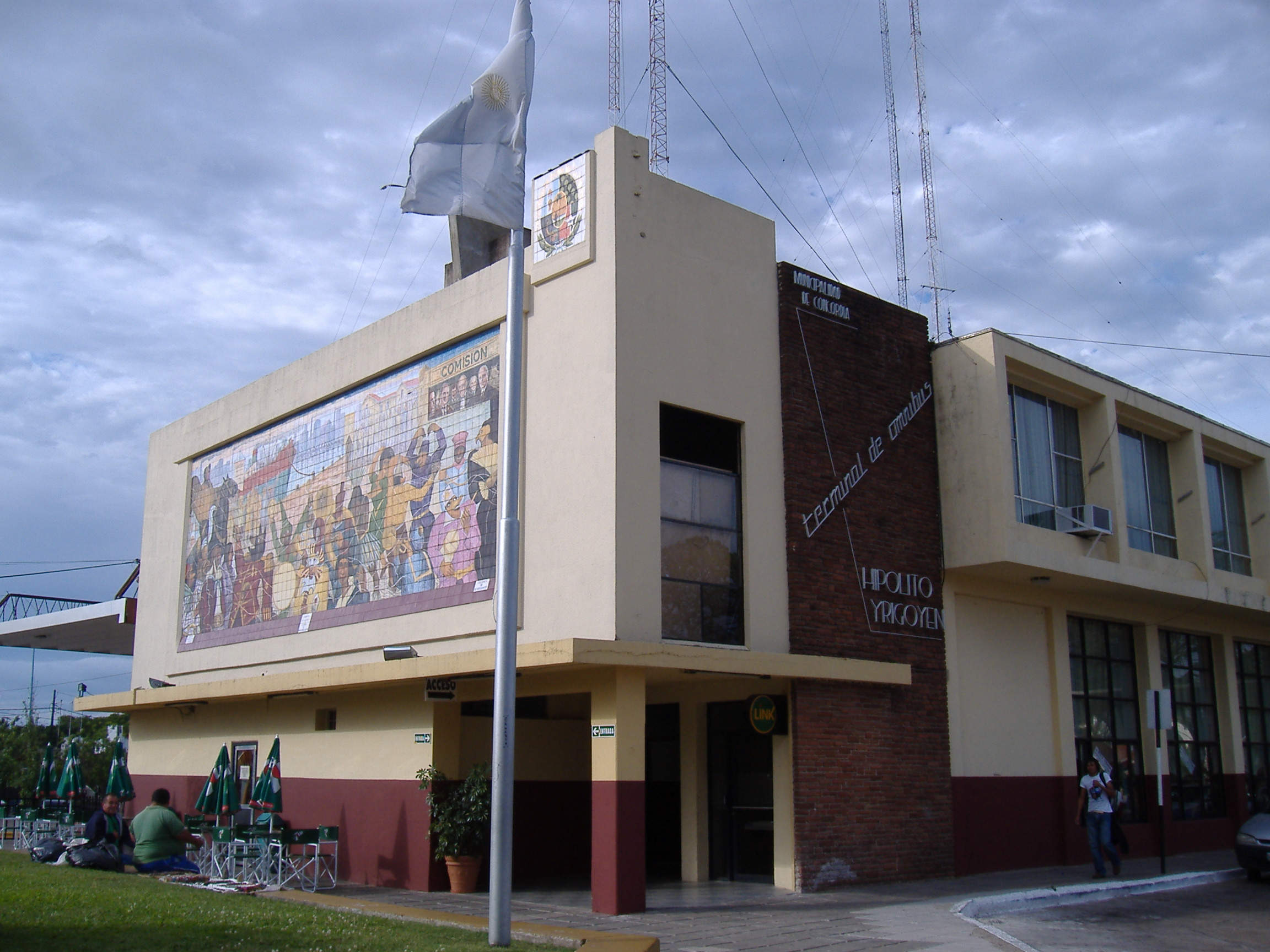
Hipólito Yrigoyen Bus Terminal

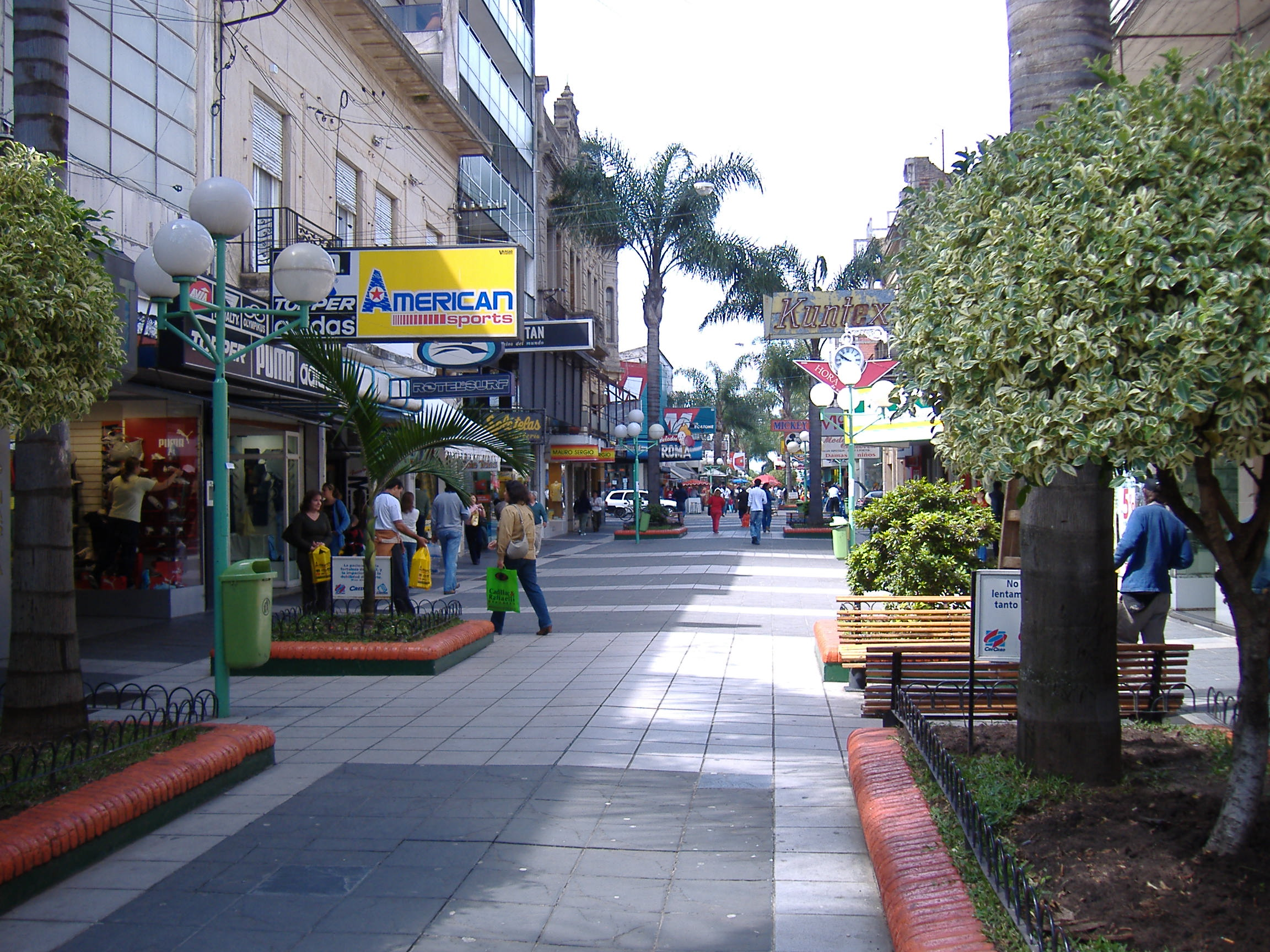
Entre Ríos Street

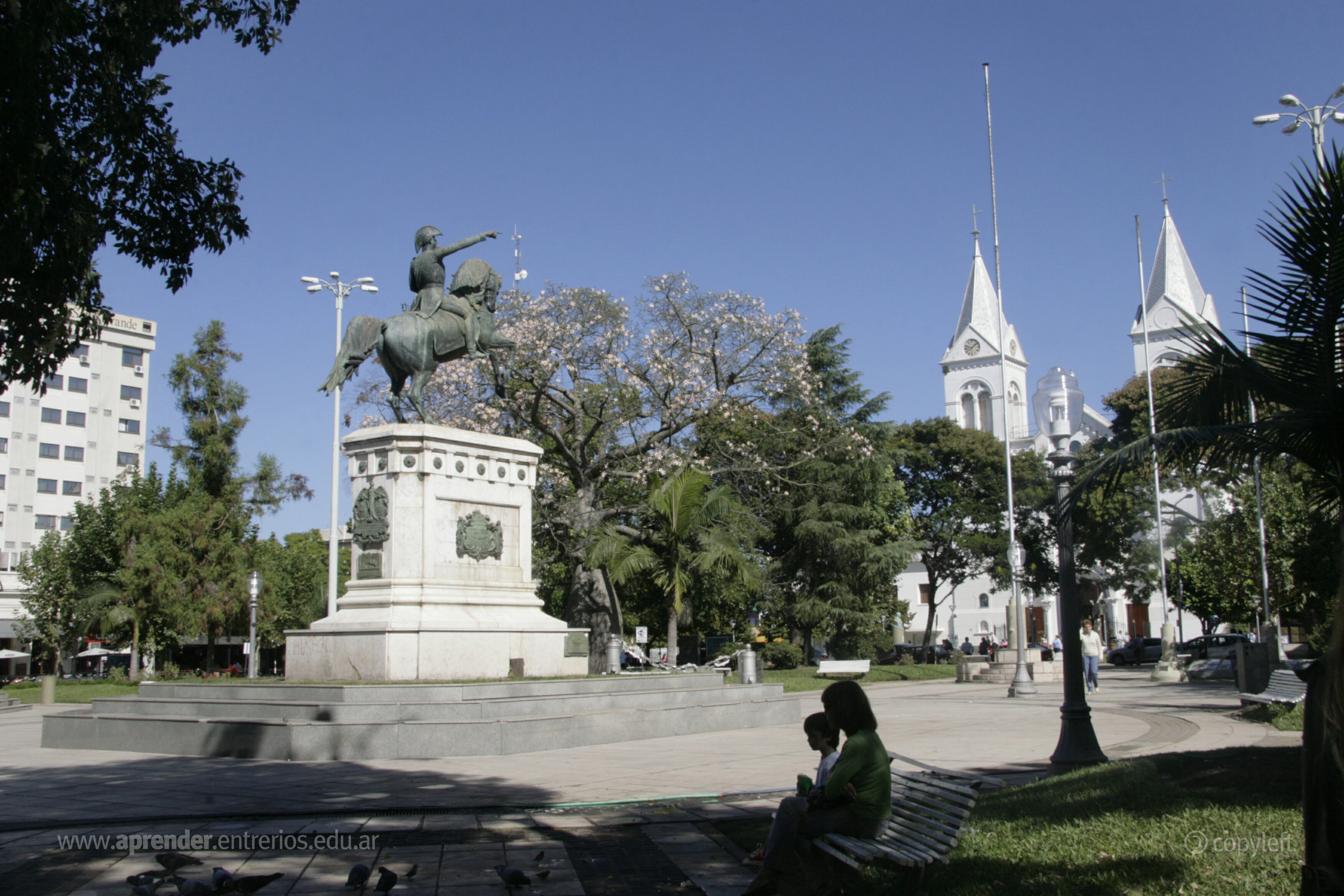
25 de Mayo Square
