= Aerolíneas Argentinas Flight 342 =

1981 aviation incident over New York

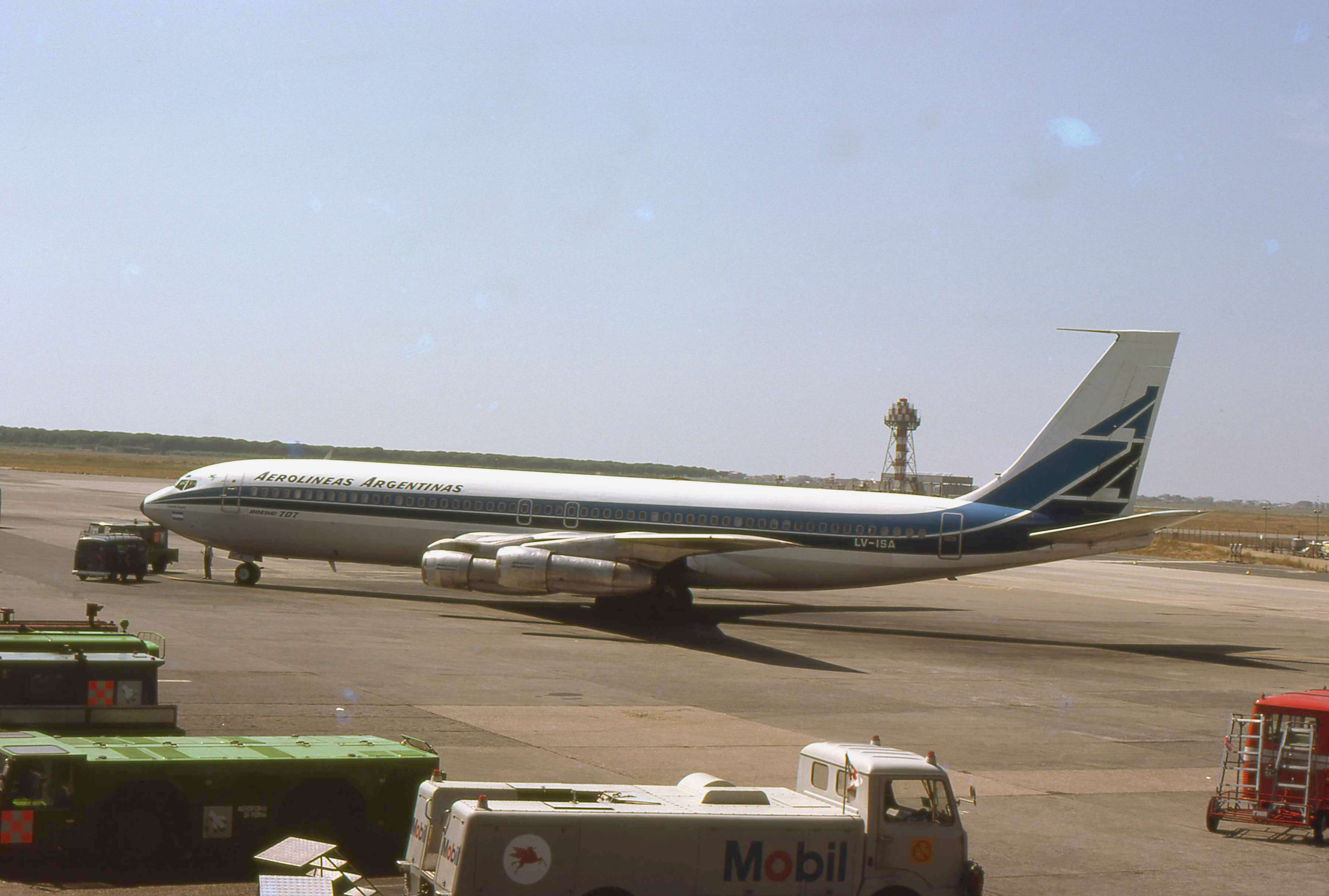
- An Aerolíneas Argentinas Boeing 707-387B, similar to the one involved in the incident

Incident
- Date: February 20, 1981
- Summary: Near crash into North Tower (WTC 1) due to unauthorized descent
- Site: North Tower (WTC 1) of the original World Trade Center Complex, New York City, New York, United States; 40°42′43.5″N 74°00′47.3″W

Aircraft
- Aircraft type: Boeing 707-387B
- Operator: Aerolíneas Argentinas
- IATA flight No.: AR342
- ICAO flight No.: ARG342
- Call sign: ARGENTINE 342 (Note: Sources recorded the call sign in lower case letters.)
- Registration: LV-???
- Flight origin: Ministro Pistarini International Airport, Buenos Aires, Argentina
- 1st stopover: Simón Bolívar International Airport, Guayaquil, Ecuador
- 2nd stopover: Miami International Airport, Miami, Florida, United States
- Destination: John F. Kennedy International Airport, New York City, New York, United States
- Occupants: 58
- Passengers: 49
- Crew: 9
- Fatalities: 0
- Survivors: 58

On February 20, 1981, Aerolíneas Argentinas Flight 342, operated by a Boeing 707, nearly hit the transmitting antenna of the North Tower of the World Trade Center in New York City during its approach to John F. Kennedy International Airport. The air traffic controller's intervention avoided the impact with less than 90 seconds of distance between the aircraft and the North Tower.

== Incident ==
Flight 342 departed from Ministro Pistarini International Airport at 08:00 am, with scheduled stopovers at José Joaquín de Olmedo International Airport and Miami International Airport. After taking off from Miami around 6:30 pm, the aircraft headed to New York City with an estimated arrival time of 9:00 pm (Eastern Time). However, due to adverse weather conditions – dense clouds and rain – visibility was limited.

During the approach to John F. Kennedy International Airport, the crew was instructed to descend to 2,700 ft (800 m) but misinterpreted the command and descended to 1,500 ft (500 m). At the time, the aircraft was on a collision course with the transmitting antenna located at the top of the North Tower of the World Trade Center, whose total height was 1,730 ft (530 m).

Air traffic controller Donald Zimmerman of the TRACON center in New York detected on radar that the aircraft was descending to a dangerous altitude. The ground proximity warning system (GPWS) was activated, and Zimmerman contacted the crew, asking for their altitude. Confirming that they were flying at 1,500 ft (500 m), he immediately ordered, "Argentine 342, turn right immediately and set course 180°." Seconds later, he added, "Argentine 342, climb climb immediately, maintain 3,000 ft (900 m)."

The crew executed a right turn and began a climb. The aircraft flew away from Manhattan and reached an altitude at 3,000 ft (900 m), averting disaster with a margin of less than 90 seconds. Subsequently, the crew completed a new approach and landed safely at John F. Kennedy International Airport.

== Aftermath ==
Following the incident, Zimmerman took trauma leave, a common practice after high-stress events. The Federal Aviation Administration (FAA) launched an investigation into the incident. Days later, The New York Times published an article highlighting Zimmerman's quick action and questioning the operational safety of Aerolíneas Argentinas. New York Congressman Jonathan B. Bingham called for a review of approach procedures at congested airports like John F. Kennedy International Airport.

A week later Zimmerman said in a news conference that he still had not gotten over the shock of the incident. Zimmerman said, "For myself, I don't know how it got that close so low."

The FAA credits the minimum safe altitude warning system (MSAW) for alerting Zimmerman to the aircraft's descent by an audible and visual alarm on his radarscope.

== See also ==
- Aerolíneas Argentinas accidents and incidents
- American Airlines Flight 11
