= Celestino Piaggio =

Argentine pianist, conductor and composer

Celestino Piaggio (20 December 1886 - 26 October 1931) was an Argentine pianist, conductor and composer.

Piaggio was born in Concordia, Argentina. He studied at the Schola Cantorum, Paris. He died in Buenos Aires, aged 44.

== Works, editions, recordings ==
- Minuetto en mi bemol for piano, 1901
- Los días, 7 miniaturas for piano, 1902
- Miniatura for string orchestra, 1903
- Hoja de álbum for violin and string orchestra, 1903
- Andantino for string orchestra, 1904
- Gavotta for string orchestra, 1904
- Miniatura for piano, 1904
- Página gris for piano, 1904
- Bagatela for piano, 1904
- Humorística for piano, 1904
- Arabescos for piano, 1905
- La urna, canzona, text by Alberto Williams, 1905
- Yo no lo sé, song 1905
- Danza for string orchestra, 1905
- Madrigal for voice and piano, 1905
- Trois mélodies texts by Tristan Klingsor, Jacques Normand and Sully Prudhomme, 1907
- Taisons-nous, chanson, 1907
- Les marionnettes, chanson, text by Tristán Klingsor, 1908
- Chanson des belles, text by Tristán Klingsor, 1911
- Sonata en do sostenido menor for piano, 1912–13
- Obertura en do menor for orchestra, 1913–14
- Sinfonía, 1915
- Tonada for piano, 1915
- Trois mélodies texts by André Suarès, 1915–17
- Lourde, lourde était mon âme, chanson, text by André Suarés, 1916
- Stella matutina, canzona, text by André Suarés, 1918
- Homenaje a Julián Aguirre for piano, 1925
