= San Carlos Castle =

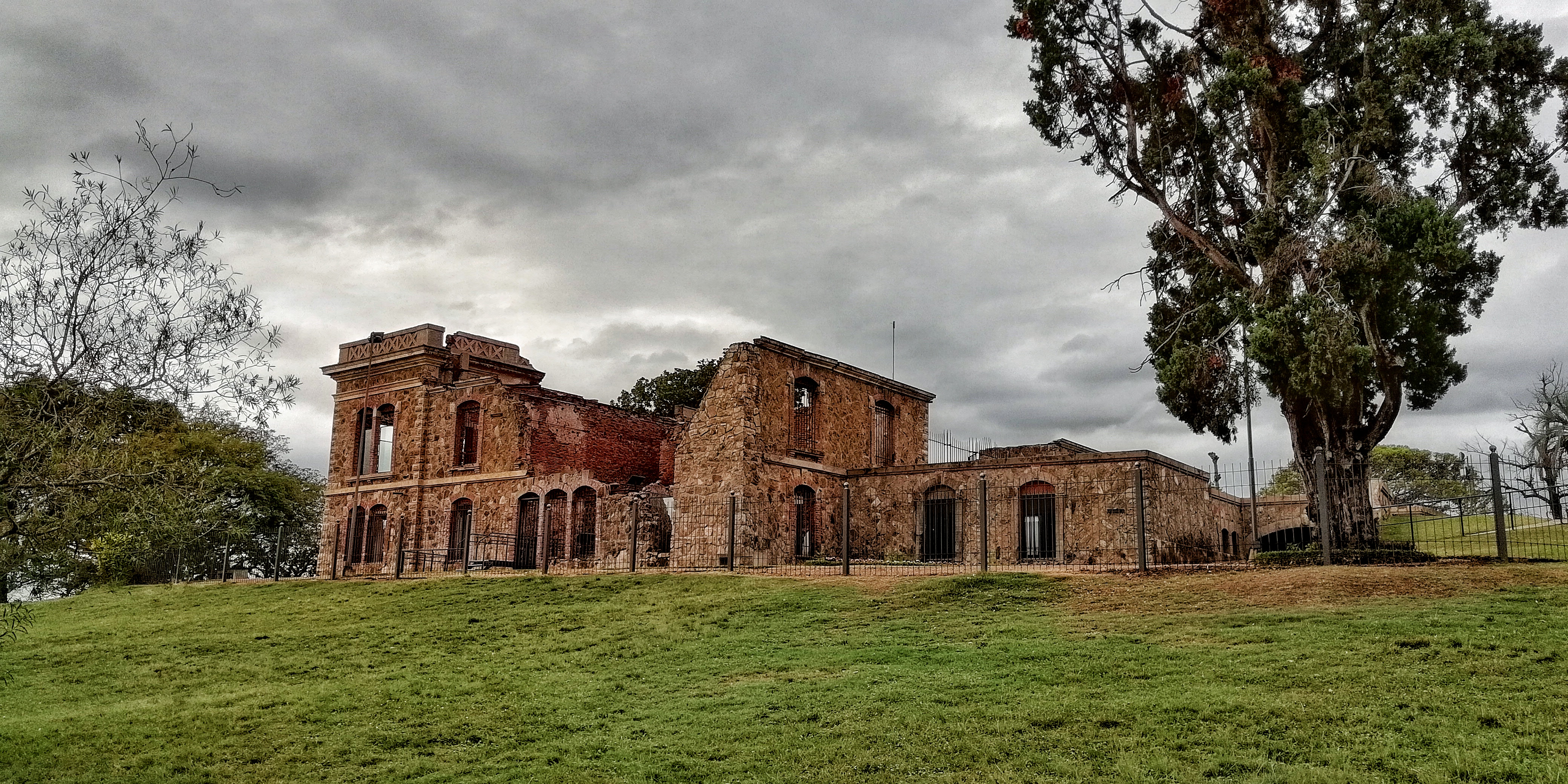
- Interactive map of the San Carlos Castle area

General information
- Location: Concordia, Argentina
- Coordinates: 31.367836°S 57.998193°W
- Construction started: 1886
- Completed: 1888

The San Carlos Castle (Spanish: Castillo de San Carlos) is a castle located in Concordia, Argentina.

== History ==
The castle was built by Éduard Demanchy, a French magnate. In 1888, the castle was built with materials brought from Europe. From 1888 to 1891, the Demanchy family settled in this building. After the Demanchy family left the building, it was inhabited by the French Fuchs Valon family. In 1929, Antoine de Saint Exupéry made an emergency landing in the castle gardens. In September 1938, the building suffered a fire, which partially destroyed it. The building served as a place for the creation of candles, a fruit stand and a salting establishment. In the 1990s, the idea of renovating the building was considered, in agreement with the architect Magadán. In 2008, the first works of renovation of the building were started by the government of the municipality of Concordia, the Architects Council of the province of Entre Ríos and the Advisory Commission of the Special Fund of Salto Grande. In 2011, walkways were installed to facilitate access to the building. The people in charge of the restoration of the Castillo San Carlos won the "Prize for the Best Intervention of more than 1000m2" awarded by the International Conservation Center and the Central Society of Architects. In October 2020, activities were held for the anniversary of the Castle in which the importance and history of the building in Concordia was discussed. In 2017, a film about the Castle was released, the film is called "Vuelo Nocturno" (Night Flight). In 2019, a TEDx conference was held in the Castle Park.
