= Gustavo Ruiz Díaz =

Argentine footballer

Personal information
- Full name: Gustavo Daniel Ruiz Díaz
- Date of birth: September 26, 1981 (age 45)
- Place of birth: Concordia, Argentina
- Height: 1.73 m (5 ft 8 in)
- Position: Central midfielder

Team information
- Current team: Brown de Adrogué

Senior career*
Years	Team	Apps	(Gls)
2001–2007	Los Andes	168	(11)
2008	Emelec	15	(0)
2009	Club Comunicaciones		
2009–	Brown de Adrogué		
- * Club domestic league appearances and goals

Gustavo Ruiz Díaz (born September 29, 1981, in Concordia) is an Argentine footballer who currently plays for Brown de Adrogué.

== Career ==
He started most of his games playing for Club Atlético Los Andes in the lower divisions of Argentine football. He became one of the most important members of his team, so much that he was named captain of the squad for his last two seasons. In April 2008 Ruiz Díaz was signed by Ecuadorian giants Emelec on a one-year contract. In 2009, Diaz was signed by Club Comunicaciones.
