= Comodoro Pierrestegui Airport =

Airport in Argentina

Comodoro Pierrestegui Airport Aeropuerto de Concordia "Comodoro Pierrestegui"
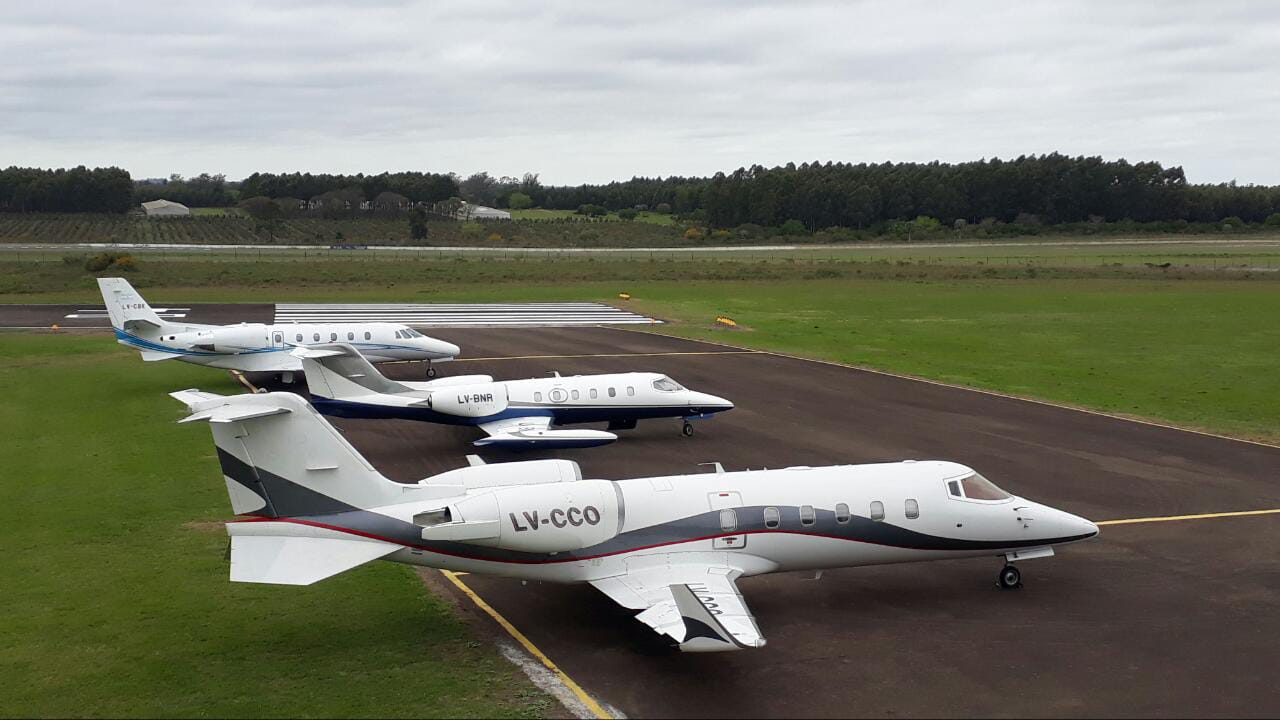
- IATA: COC; ICAO: SAAC

Summary
- Operator: Municipality of Concordia
- Serves: Concordia; Federación
- Location: Monseñor Rosch and Suboficial Principal Tesce (C.P. 3200), Concordia
- Elevation AMSL: 34 m (112 ft)
- Coordinates: 31°17′49″S 57°59′48″W

Map
- Location of the airport in Argentina

Runways
Direction	Length		Surface
Direction	m	ft	Surface
04/22	2,000	6,562	Asphalt concrete
- Sources: ORSNA, World Aero Data, GCM, STV

Concordia "Comodoro Pierrestegui" Airport (Spanish: Aeropuerto de Concordia "Comodoro Pierrestegui") (IATA: COC, ICAO: SAAC), also known as Concordia Airport, is a domestic airport serving Concordia, Entre Ríos, Argentina. It is located 13 kilometres (8.1 mi) north of the city. On March 31st 2025, a new terminal and a new 2000m runway were inaugurated. The airport covers an area of 94 hectares (0.36 sq mi; 230 acres) and has a 257-square-metre (2,770 sq ft) terminal.

== Airlines and destinations ==
Airlines	Destinations
Humming Airways	Buenos Aires–Aeroparque

== Accidents and incidents ==
- 15 November 1975: On approach to the airport inbound from Buenos Aires, an Aerolíneas Argentinas Fokker F28-1000, tail number LV-LOB, struck tree tops 4 kilometres (2.5 mi) short of the runway, causing the nosegear to contact the ground first, shearing off both the nose and the nosegear. There were no reported fatalities, but the aircraft was damaged beyond repair and was written off.

== See also ==
- Aerolíneas Argentinas accidents and incidents
- List of airports in Argentina
