= Aerolíneas Argentinas Flight 644 =

1961 aviation accident in Argentina

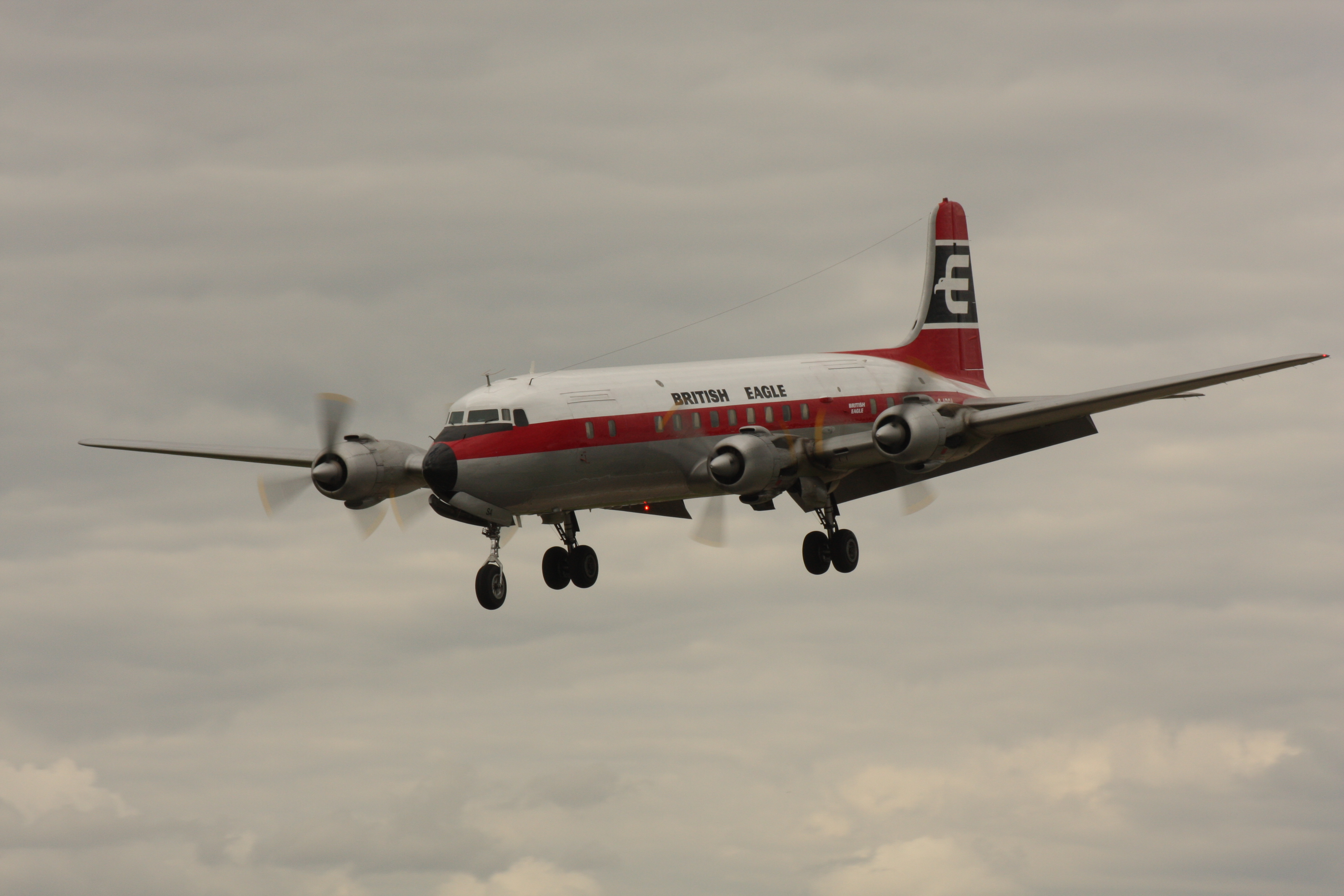
- A similar Douglas DC-6

Accident
- Date: 19 July 1961
- Summary: Severe turbulence
- Site: 12 kilometres (7.5 mi) west of Pardo, Buenos Aires, Argentina; 36°13′58″S 59°30′56″W

Aircraft
- Aircraft type: Douglas DC-6
- Aircraft name: General San Martin
- Operator: Aerolíneas Argentinas
- Call sign: ARGENTINA 644
- Registration: LV-ADW
- Flight origin: Ministro Pistarini International Airport, Buenos Aires, Argentina
- Destination: General Enrique Mosconi International Airport, Comodoro Rivadavia, Argentina
- Occupants: 67
- Passengers: 60
- Crew: 7
- Fatalities: 67
- Survivors: 0

Aerolíneas Argentinas Flight 644 was a scheduled flight operated by the Douglas DC-6, registration LV-ADW, on 19 July 1961 which was due to operate a domestic scheduled passenger service between Ministro Pistarini International Airport in Buenos Aires City and General Enrique Mosconi International Airport in Comodoro Rivadavia, but crashed 12 km (7.5 mi; 6.5 nmi) west of Pardo, Buenos Aires Province, Argentina, half an hour after takeoff, owing to severe turbulence during climb out. Some reports stated the aircraft was struck by lightning.

== Aircraft ==
The aircraft involved was a Douglas DC-6 built in 1948 with registration LV-ADW and had the with serial number and manufacturer serial number 43136/137 respectively. This aircraft had been originally named 'Presidente Peron' but by 1956-57 had been renamed 'General San Martin'.

== Accident ==
Flight 644 departed from Buenos Aires at 7:31 am local time. Weather reports indicated cumulonimbus clouds were present airway 45. The aircraft was to fly under instrument flight rules (IFR) and was required to report its position at the radio beacons of Lobos, Azul, Bahía Blanca, Santa Antonio, Trelew, and Comodoro Rivadavia. After takeoff, the DC-6 flew south at an altitude of 15,700 feet (4,800 m) and reached the Lobos waypoint, at 7:42 AM. The crew requested a diversion around the cumulonimus clouds from Air Traffic Control. At 8:19 AM, while flying over the Gorchs region, the crew was reported bad weather and a delay on reaching the Azul waypoint. This was the last transmission from Flight 644. While flying over Pardo, Flight 644 entered adverse weather, forcing the pilots to perform evasive maneuvers to maintain control. The wind reached an estimated speed of 76 knots (141 km/h; 87 mph) which caused the right wing to separate from the aircraft. The aircraft went into a steep dive and crashed into the ground at 220 knots (410 km/h; 250 mph). All 67 occupants of the aircraft – 7 crew and 60 passengers – were killed in the accident, which remains the deadliest one the company experienced all through its history. As of 2026, Flight 644 remains the deadliest aviation disaster in Argentine history.

== Investigation ==
According to the investigation, the plane disintegrated en route after the rupture of one its wings following excessive loads in a zone of turbulence. Both the pilot and the company's flight dispatcher contributed to the disaster by misevaluating the weather forecast and choosing an inappropriate flight altitude.

At the time of the accident, local airports in Argentina and Argentinian aircraft were not equipped with weather radar, increasing the probability of the crew encountering a cumulonimbus cloud was 31%.

Following the accident, Argentine authorities recommended installing weather radars on all commercial aircraft in the country and improvements to ATC. However, two more aviation accidents in Argentina occurred due to poor weather: Aerolíneas Argentinas Flight 707 and Austral Líneas Aéreas Flight 901.

== See also ==
- Aerolíneas Argentinas accidents and incidents
- List of accidents and incidents involving commercial aircraft
