= Isidoro Blaisten =

Argentine writer

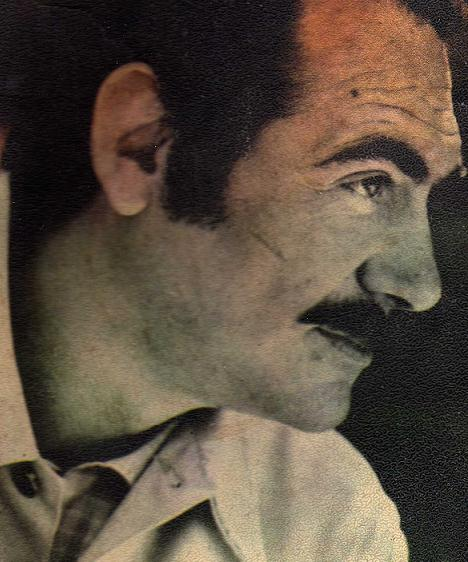
Isidoro Blaisten in 1982

Isidoro Blaisten (January 12, 1933 – August 28, 2004) was an Argentine writer.

Son of David Blaisten and Dora Gliclij, Blaisten was born in Concordia, Argentina. His family was among the many Argentine Jews who populated rural areas in Entre Ríos Province during the early 20th century. Although born with the surname Blaistein, he would later spell it Blaisten, even though his signature occasionally read Blaistein.

He was a member of the Academia Argentina de Letras from 2001 until his death as well as a correspondent for the Real Academia Española, combined literature with his profession as a neighborhood bookseller after having been a publicist and child photographer. He collaborated with the magazine El escarabajo de oro and other journalistic outlets in Argentina.

== Works ==
=== Stories ===
- La felicidad (1969)
- La salvación (1972)
- El mago (1974)
- Dublín al Sur (1980)
- Cerrado por melancolía (1982)
- Cuentos anteriores (1982) (recompilation)
- A mí nunca me dejaban hablar (1985)
- Carroza y reina (1986)
- Al acecho (1995)
- Antología personal (1997)

=== Essays ===
- Anticonferencias (1983)
- Cuando éramos felices (1992)

=== Novels ===
- Voces en la noche (2004)

=== Poetry ===
- Sucedió en la lluvia (1965)
