= United Air Lines Flight 859 =

1961 aviation accident

Coordinates: 39°45′38.6″N 104°53′31.1″W

United Airlines Flight 859
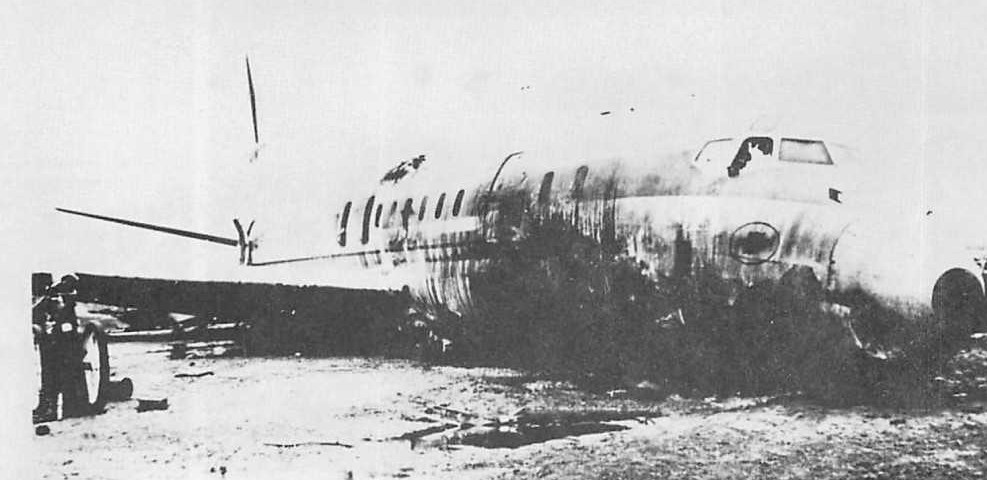
- Wreckage of the aircraft after the accident

Accident
- Date: July 11, 1961
- Summary: Mechanical failure combined with pilot error
- Site: Denver, Colorado
- Total fatalities: 18
- Total injuries: 84

Aircraft
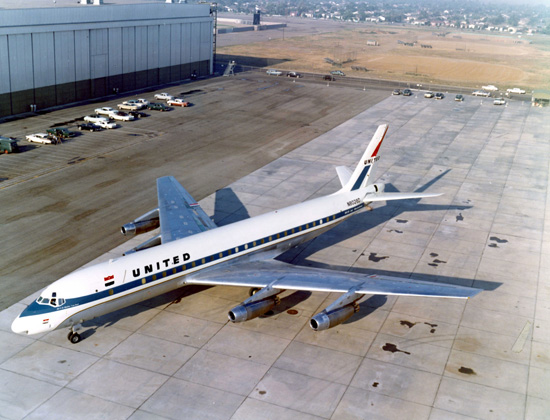
- A similar United DC-8 to the one involved
- Aircraft type: Douglas DC-8-12
- Operator: United Airlines
- IATA flight No.: UA859
- ICAO flight No.: UAL859
- Call sign: UNITED 859
- Registration: N8040U
- Flight origin: Eppley Airfield, Nebraska
- Destination: Stapleton International Airport, Colorado
- Occupants: 122
- Passengers: 115
- Crew: 7
- Fatalities: 17
- Injuries: 84
- Survivors: 105

Ground casualties
- Ground fatalities: 1

United Airlines Flight 859 was a Douglas DC-8, registration N8040U, on a scheduled passenger flight that crashed on landing at Stapleton International Airport in Denver, Colorado after departing from Omaha, Nebraska's Eppley Airfield on July 11, 1961. Eighteen people were killed, and 84 were injured.

The crash was caused by the failure of the two port engines to generate reverse thrust, which sent the aircraft off the runway. One of the plane's fuel tanks subsequently ruptured and ignited.

== Background ==
=== Aircraft ===
The aircraft involved was a Douglas DC-8-12, registration N8040U. It was manufactured on June 10, 1961, and had accumulated a total of 124:39 flight hours at the time of the accident. It was powered by four Pratt & Whitney JT3C-6 engines.

=== Crew ===
The crew consisted of Captain John Grosso, First Officer Arthur F. Putz, Flight Engineer James M. Beatie and four stewardesses. Captain Grosso was a highly experienced pilot, having accumulated 17,631 flight hours, of which 168 were in the DC-8. First Officer Putz had accumulated 9,839 flight hours, of which 120 were in the DC-8. Flight Engineer Beatie had accumulated 8,416 flight hours, of which 215 were in the DC-8.

== Accident ==
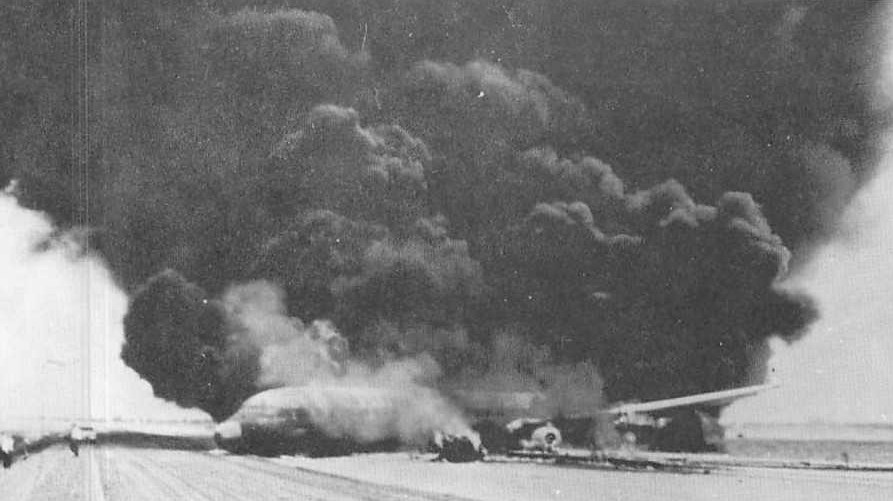
The aircraft on fire during the emergency response

The aircraft had suffered a hydraulic failure while en route from Omaha. The failure was not thought serious, however; the crew followed the checklists for hydraulic failure, and preparation was made for an expected routine landing. The plane touched down normally, but when the engines' thrust levers were moved to the reverse position, the reverser buckets for the engines on the port side failed to deploy correctly. That failure caused the left-side engines to continue generating forward thrust, while the right-side engines generated reverse thrust.

The plane immediately began to veer to the right as a result of the asymmetrical thrust. All tires blew out on the right main landing gear, after which the plane left the runway and hit a taxiway still under construction. The nose gear collapsed, and the airplane then slammed into several airport vehicles, including construction equipment. This ruptured a fuel tank on the right wing and caught fire, killing 18 (including one on the ground) and injuring 84 out of a total of 122 people aboard.

== Investigation ==
Carbon monoxide poisoning was the cause of death for 16 of the passengers, who were unable to evacuate. One elderly woman broke both ankles during the evacuation, and later died from shock.

The Civil Aeronautics Board (CAB) report stated that a contributing factor to the accident was the failure of the first officer to monitor the reverse thrust indicator lights when he applied reverse thrust.

The airport fire department was found to be deficient in its emergency equipment, but the fire crews were praised for their efforts.

== See also ==
- 1961 in aviation
- 1961 in the United States
- Aviation accidents and incidents
- List of accidents and incidents involving commercial aircraft
