= Aerolíneas Argentinas Flight 707 =

1970 aviation accident in Argentina

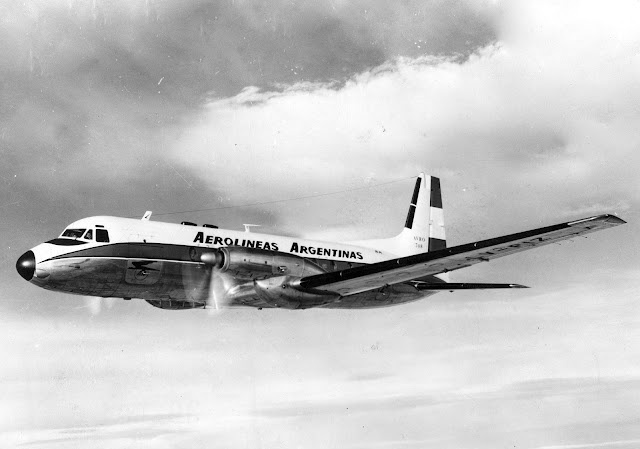
- LV-HGW, the aircraft involved in the accident

Accident
- Date: 4 February 1970
- Summary: Severe turbulence
- Site: Loma Alta, Argentina; 26.765°S 58.800°W

Aircraft
- Aircraft type: Hawker Siddeley HS 748
- Aircraft name: Ciudad de Bahía Blanca
- Operator: Aerolíneas Argentinas
- Registration: LV-HGW
- Flight origin: Silvio Pettirossi International Airport, Asunción, Paraguay
- 1st stopover: El Pucú Airport, Formosa, Argentina
- 2nd stopover: Camba Puntá Airport, Corrientes, Argentina
- Last stopover: Islas Malvinas International Airport, Rosario, Argentina
- Destination: Ministro Pistarini International Airport, Buenos Aires, Argentina
- Passengers: 33
- Crew: 4
- Fatalities: 37
- Survivors: 0

Aerolíneas Argentinas Flight 707 was an international passenger flight on the route of: Asunción–Formosa–Corrientes–Rosario–Buenos Aires, which on 4 February 1970, the Avro 748-105 Srs. 1 that was operating the flight at the time, crashed near the city of Loma Alta, Chaco, Argentina due to severe turbulence. All 37 occupants onboard the flight were killed.

== Aircraft ==
The aircraft that was operating the flight at the time was a Avro 748-105 Srs. 1, MSN 1539 and was registered LV-HYW. The aircraft was manufactured in 1961, 9 years prior and had logged 19049 hours and 15739 flights.

== Description ==
While en route on its third leg between Camba Puntá Airport (now Doctor Fernando Piragine Niveyro International Airport) in Corrientes and Fisherton Airport (now Islas Malvinas International Airport) in Rosario, the aircraft flew into a cumulonimbus cloud; the pilots lost control of the aircraft after it encountered severe turbulence, the plane entered a left bank of 90 degrees and entered a 45-degree dive, it then crashed into the ground. All 37 occupants of the aircraft (33 passengers and 4 crew members) perished in the accident.

== Cause ==
The cause of the accident was found to be loss of control of the airplane and collision with terrain when encountering a zone with adverse meteorological conditions and severe turbulence.

== See also ==
- Aerolíneas Argentinas accidents and incidents
