= Legrand-Simon LS.60 =

LS.60
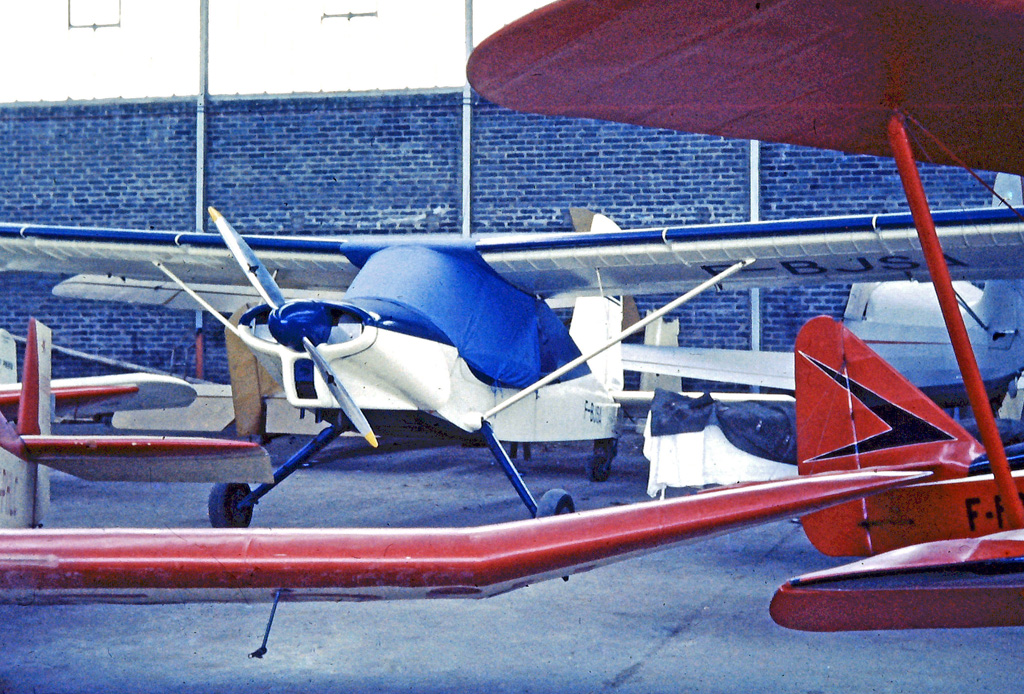
- The sole LS.60 at Guyancourt airfield near Paris in June 1963

General information
- Type: Two seat light aircraft
- National origin: France
- Designer: Paul Legrand and Michel Simon
- Number built: 1

History
- First flight: 27 April 1961
- Developed from: LS.50 Dauphine

The Legrand-Simon LS.60 is a single-engine, high-wing monoplane seating two side-by-side. It was built in France in the early 1960s in response to a government competition for a club trainer. It won the competition but nevertheless failed to go into production; only the prototype, which still flies, was completed.

== Design and development ==
In the late 1950s a collaboration between Paul Legrand, an aviation engineer employed by SNECMA and Michel Simon of Breguet Aviation led to the LS.50 two seat light aircraft, built as a one-off prototype. They developed this into the LS.60 which was intended for production and was entered into a government competition for a club trainer.

The LS.60 has a high, braced wing of constant chord, mounted with 5° of dihedral. It has two plywood spars with a plywood-Klégécell (a structural foam) torsion box between them and light alloy leading edges. There are full span, fixed slots on the leading edges and wooden, slotted ailerons and flaps. The wings are braced with a single strut on each side to the lower fuselage. The central fuselage is steel framed, with a cabane which forms the upper cabin and joins the wings. Below there is a steel U-shape cross member which links the two sides of the cabane and carries attachment points for the seats, controls, undercarriage and wing struts. The fuselage is rectangular in section, the forward part covered with a ply-Klégécell sandwich and the rear sides and bottom with plywood alone. The upper side is fabric covered. The cowling over the 67 kW (90 hp) Continental C90 flat four engine, which drives a two blade propeller, is glass fibre. The fin is an integral part of the fuselage structure and, like the cantilever horizontal tail is ply covered over a wooden structure; only the rudder is fabric covered. The tail surfaces are straight edged and the tailplane is placed at mid fuselage and well to the rear, with the rudder moving above it and its leading edge under the rudder hinge. Both rudder and elevators carry trim tabs.

The SL.60's underwing cabin provides dual control from the side-by-side configuration seats, accessed by doors on each side which have full width, narrow longitudinal bulges to provide extra elbow room. Baggage storage is under the seats. The undercarriage is fixed and conventional, with mainwheels on hinged cantilever tube steel legs which have horizontal extensions under the fuselage that are rubber sprung to the centre structure. The mainwheels have brakes and the tailwheel is steerable.

The prototype LS.60 was built at the Breguet factory and first flew on 27 April 1961. It was declared competition winner and production of 200 aircraft was anticipated, but this did not happen and only the prototype was ever built.

== Operational history ==
The sole LS.60, F-PJSA (previously F-BJSA and F-WJSA) was flying in France as recently as 2006 and remained on the French register in 2010.

== Specifications ==
Data from Jane's All the World's Aircraft 1962-63

General characteristics

- Capacity: 2
- Length: 6.01 m (19 ft 9 in)
- Wingspan: 9.70 m (31 ft 10 in)
- Wing area: 13.65 m^{2} (146.9 sq ft)
- Aspect ratio: 7
- Airfoil: NACA 23012
- Empty weight: 461 kg (1,016 lb)
- Max takeoff weight: 707 kg (1,559 lb)
- Powerplant: 1 × Continental C90-14F Air cooled flat four, 67 kW (90 hp)
- Propellers: 2-bladed Ratier, pitch ground adjustable

Performance

- Maximum speed: 185 km/h (115 mph, 100 kn) at sea level
- Cruise speed: 170 km/h (110 mph, 92 kn) at 1,000 m (3,280ft)
- Range: 700 km (430 mi, 380 nmi)
- Service ceiling: 5,600 m (18,400 ft) service
- Rate of climb: 4.0 m/s (790 ft/min) at sea level
- Take-off distance to 15 m (50 ft): 240 m (785 ft)
- Landing distance from 15 m (50 ft): 220 m (720 ft)
