= Isaac Ganón =

Uruguayan university teacher and sociologist

Isaac Ganón (30 August 1916 – 10 September 1975) was a Uruguayan sociologist.

== Biography ==
He is considered a founder of sociological lecturing and investigation in Uruguay. He chaired the Uruguayan Association of Social Sciences and also the Latin American Sociological Association. From 1958 till 1968 he led the Institute of Sociology at the University of the Republic.
