= Aerolíneas Argentinas Flight 322 =

1961 aviation accident

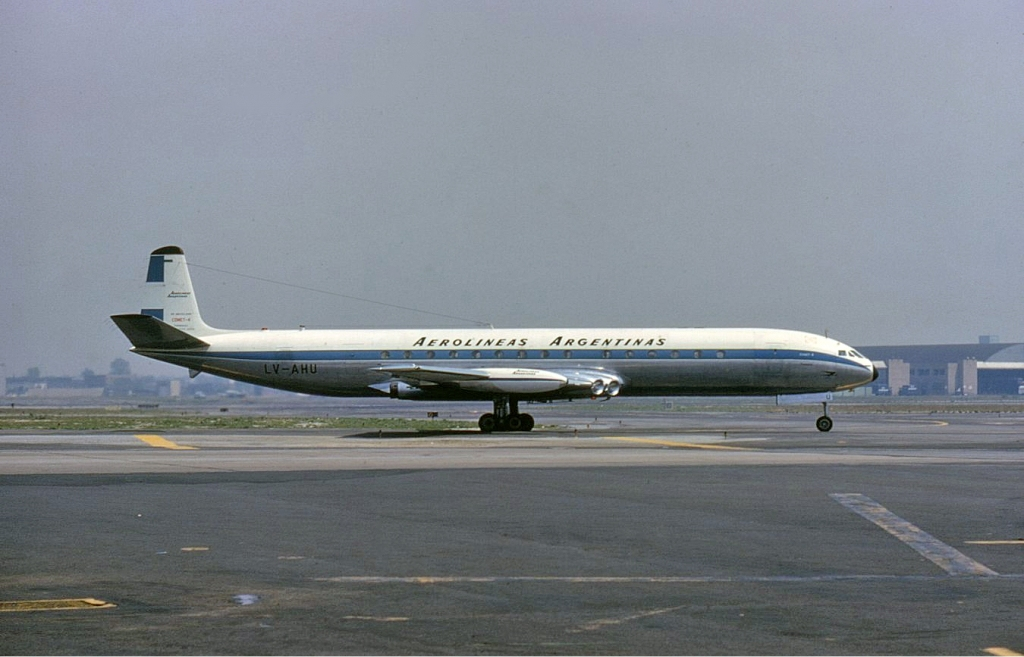
- An Aerolíneas Argentinas Comet 4, similar to the one involved in the accident

Accident
- Date: 23 November 1961
- Summary: Pilot error
- Site: 2 kilometres (1.2 mi) off Viracopos-Campinas International Airport, Campinas, São Paulo, Brazil; 22°59′27″S 47°10′30″W

Aircraft
- Aircraft type: de Havilland DH-106 Comet 4
- Operator: Aerolíneas Argentinas
- Registration: LV-AHR
- Flight origin: Ministro Pistarini International Airport, Buenos Aires, Argentina
- 1st stopover: Viracopos-Campinas International Airport, Campinas, São Paulo, Brazil
- 2nd stopover: Piarco International Airport, Port of Spain, Trinidad
- Destination: Idlewild Airport, New York City, United States
- Passengers: 40
- Crew: 12
- Fatalities: 52
- Survivors: 0

Aerolíneas Argentinas Flight 322 was a scheduled Buenos Aires–São Paulo–Port of Spain–New York City international passenger service, operated with a Comet 4, registration LV-AHR, that crashed during climbout on the early stages of its second leg, when it collided with tree tops shortly after takeoff from Viracopos-Campinas International Airport on 23 November 1961. All 52 on board, including 40 passengers, were killed in the crash.

== Flight history ==
The jetliner arrived from Buenos Aires, Argentina and landed at Viracopos-Campinas International Airport, 62 miles (100 km) north of São Paulo, as an intermediate stop. It took off at 05:38, bound for Piarco International Airport, Trinidad, with New York City as its final destination. After reaching an altitude of about 100 metres (330 ft), the aircraft lost altitude, collided with eucalyptus trees and crashed into the ground; its fuel tanks exploded on impact. All 52 people on board were killed in the disaster.

== Investigation ==
The accident was investigated by the Brazilian government with participation from the government of Argentina, the state of registry of the accident aircraft.

The weather conditions at the time of the accident were "dark night due to 7/8 (broken) stratocumulus at 400 metres (1,300 ft) and to 8/8 coverage (overcast) by altostratus at 2,100 metres (6,900 ft)." According to the Brazilian Air Ministry, the weather conditions did not contribute to the accident.

The investigation revealed that the first officer was seated in the left seat of the flight deck, which the investigators saw as an indication that he was receiving flight instruction from the captain during the accident flight. (Note: The Brazilian Air Ministry report mentions the first officer's lack of logged pilot in command time in type, although it's unclear whether Argentinian flight rules would have allowed a first officer to log such time before he is promoted to captain. The Argentinian government makes no mention of this point in its official "cause" statement.)

The Brazilian Air Ministry determined the following Probable Cause:

It was presumed that the co-pilot was under flight instruction. If such was the case, the instructor, who was pilot-in-command, may have failed to brief or supervise the co-pilot properly.

The Argentinian government issued the following statement:

Argentina has determined, in the light of information it has gathered, that the cause of the accident was: "Failure to operate under IFR during a takeoff by night in weather conditions requiring IFR operation and failure to follow the climb procedure for this type of aircraft; a contributory cause was the lack of vigilance by the pilot-in-command during the operations."

== See also ==
- Aerolíneas Argentinas accidents and incidents
- List of accidents and incidents involving commercial aircraft
