= Mud Lake (Nevada) =

There are several lakes named Mud Lake within the U.S. state of Nevada.

- Mud Lake, Churchill County, Nevada. 39°30′59″N 118°54′12″W
- Mud Lake, Douglas County, Nevada. 38°50′33″N 119°44′08″W
- Mud Lake, Elko County, Nevada. 41°17′42″N 116°55′06″W
- Mud Lake, Humboldt County, Nevada. 41°47′24″N 119°18′08″W
- Mud Lake, Nye County, Nevada. 37°52′10″N 117°04′17″W
- Mud Lake, Nye County, Nevada. 37°36′28″N 117°00′29″W
- Mud Lake, Washoe County, Nevada. 39°17′37″N 119°57′11″W
- Winnemucca Lake, also known as Mud Lake, Washoe County, Nevada. 40°07′19″N 119°20′23″W
- Mud Lake, Washoe County, Nevada. 41°42′09″N 119°54′27″W
- Calcutta Lake, also known as Mud Lake, Washoe County, Nevada. 41°50′49″N 119°41′25″W
