= Aerolíneas Argentinas Flight 670 =

1957 aviation accident

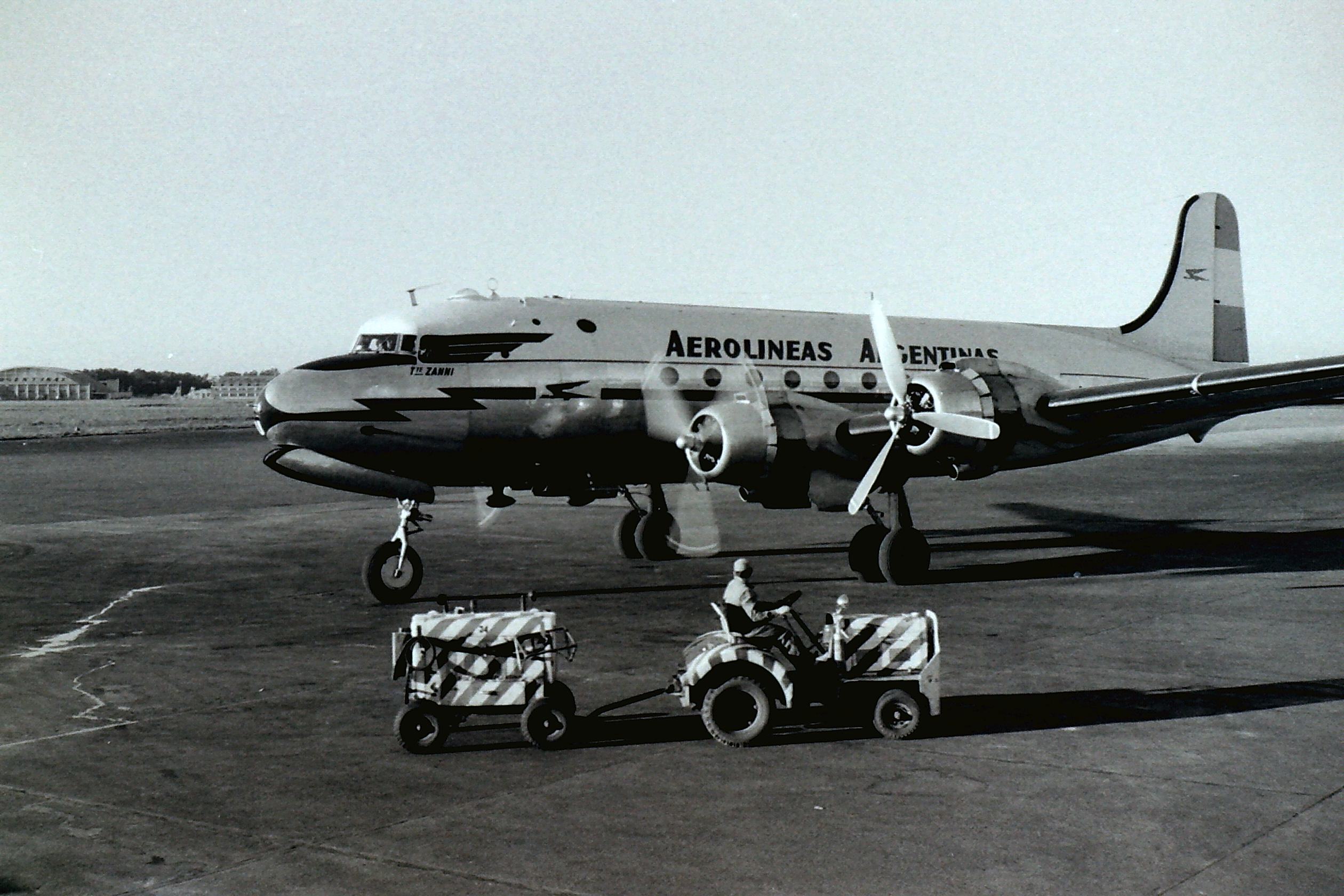
- An Aerolíneas Argentinas DC-4 in 1958, similar to the aircraft involved.

Accident
- Date: 8 December 1957
- Summary: Structural failure due to turbulence in extreme weather conditions
- Site: 25 km (16 mi) Southeast of San Carlos de Bolívar, Argentina

Aircraft
- Aircraft type: Douglas DC-4
- Operator: Aerolíneas Argentinas
- Registration: LV-AHZ
- Flight origin: Ministro Pistarini International Airport, BA (EZE/SAEZ), Argentina
- Destination: San Carlos de Bariloche International Airport, RN (BRC/SAZS), Argentina
- Occupants: 61
- Passengers: 55
- Crew: 6
- Fatalities: 61
- Injuries: 0
- Survivors: 0

The crash of Aerolíneas Argentinas Flight 670 was an accident involving a Douglas DC-4 of the Argentinian airline Aerolíneas Argentinas in San Carlos de Bolívar, Argentina on 8 December 1957, killing all 61 people on board.

== Accident ==
Aerolíneas Argentinas Flight 670 took off from Ministro Pistarini International Airport in Buenos Aires, Argentina at 3.54 pm on 8 December 1957 on a scheduled flight to San Carlos de Bariloche International Airport in Bariloche, Argentina, carrying 6 crew and 55 passengers. ATC cleared Flight 670 for an IFR flight outside airways, at an altitude of 3,937 ft (1,200 m) towards Neuquen, with the remainder of the flight being cleared for 7,874 ft (2,400 m).

However the aircraft only flew at a height of 328 ft (100 m) to 492 ft (150 m) for a distance of 35 to 40 km (22 to 25 mi) and thereby deviated 21 km (13 mi) from its intended course. The captain of Flight 670 executed this tactic in an effort to avoid an intense cold front by flying under it.

The captain ultimately flew the aircraft into the worsening storm at its most active part, and proceeded to climb sharply. At a height of 8,202 ft (2,500 m), the aircraft's left wing failed, followed quickly by the tail section as it dove uncontrollably towards the ground.

At 4.45 pm, Flight 670 crashed 25 kilometres (16 miles) Southeast of San Carlos de Bolívar at a descent angle of 35 degrees and a 25-degree left bank while going over 400 km/h (250 mph). The aircraft was destroyed by the impact and post-crash fire. None of the plane's 61 occupants survived the crash.

== Aircraft ==
The Douglas DC-4 involved, registered LV-AHZ (msn 27227) was built in 1944 for the US Air Force. It remained in their service until March 1946, when it was sold to United Airlines. The aircraft was taken out of service in January 1957 and subsequently sold to Aerolíneas Argentinas in May 1957, where the aircraft remained until its last flight on 8 December 1957.

== Aftermath & investigation ==
The aircraft was destroyed in the accident, while all 61 occupants of the flight were killed.

An investigation of the accident revealed that the aircraft disintegrated in flight due to the breaking off of the left wing and tail section following the stresses the aircraft received from severe turbulence in the harsh weather conditions. The pilot's decision to fly recklessly into the storm is seen as a contributing factor to the accident.
