= CSRP3 =

Protein-coding gene in humans

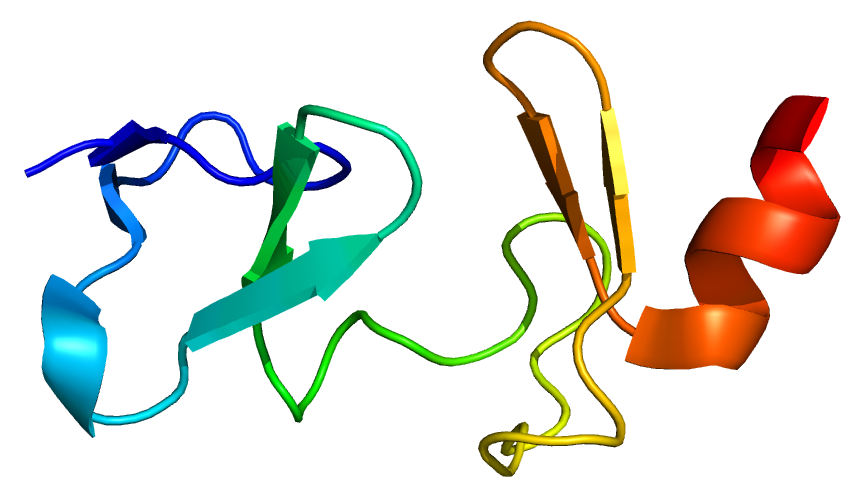

Identifiers
- Aliases: CSRP3, CLP, CMD1M, CMH12, CRP3, LMO4, MLP, cysteine and glycine rich protein 3
- External IDs: OMIM: 600824; MGI: 1330824; GeneCards: CSRP3
Available structures
PDB	Ortholog search: PDBe RCSB
PDB	List of PDB id codes 2O10, 2O13

Gene location (Human)
Chr.	Chromosome 11 (human)
Band	11p15.1	Start	19,182,030 bp
Band	11p15.1	End	19,210,571 bp

Gene location (Mouse)
Chr.	Chromosome 7 (mouse)
Band	7|7 B4	Start	48,480,146 bp
Band	7|7 B4	End	48,497,781 bp
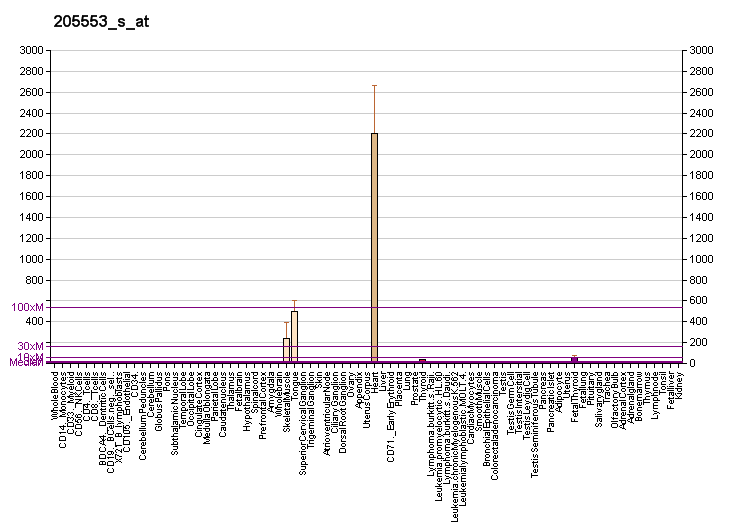
RNA expression pattern
Bgee	Human / Mouse (ortholog); Top expressed in: Skeletal muscle tissue of rectus abdominis; right ventricle; myocardium of left ventricle; apex of heart; biceps brachii; Skeletal muscle tissue of biceps brachii; thoracic diaphragm; glutes; cardiac muscle tissue of right atrium; right auricle of heart / Top expressed in: atrioventricular valve; endocardial cushion; interventricular septum; right ventricle; cardiac muscles; myocardium of ventricle; ankle; atrium; esophagus; soleus muscle; More reference expression data
BioGPS	More reference expression data
Gene ontology
Molecular function	actinin binding; metal ion binding; telethonin binding; protein binding; structural constituent of muscle; actin binding; identical protein binding
Cellular component	cytoplasm; Z discdkac; cytoskeleton; nucleus; sarcomere
Biological process	protein localization to organelle; cell differentiation; negative regulation of myoblast differentiation; cardiac muscle contraction; cardiac muscle tissue development; regulation of the force of heart contraction; cardiac muscle hypertrophy; muscle organ development; cellular calcium ion homeostasis; positive regulation of actin filament severing; detection of muscle stretch; cardiac myofibril assembly; multicellular organism development; positive regulation of myoblast differentiation; negative regulation of actin filament severing; skeletal muscle tissue development; positive regulation of transcription by RNA polymerase II; transcription, DNA-templated; regulation of transcription, DNA-templated; inflammatory response; development of the heart; insulin receptor signaling pathway; T-tubule organization; glucose homeostasis; protein kinase C signaling; regulation of protein localization to plasma membrane; actin cytoskeleton organization; sarcomere organization; muscle tissue development
Sources:Amigo / QuickGO
Orthologs
Databases	NCBI: entry; OMA: entry
Species	Human	Mouse
Entrez	8048	13009
Ensembl	ENSG00000129170	ENSMUSG00000030470
UniProt	P50461	P50462
RefSeq (mRNA)	NM_003476; NM_001369404	NM_001198841; NM_013808
RefSeq (protein)	NP_003467	NP_001185770; NP_038836
Location (UCSC)	Chr 11: 19.18 – 19.21 Mb	Chr 7: 48.48 – 48.5 Mb
PubMed search
- Wikidata
View/Edit Human	View/Edit Mouse

Cysteine and glycine-rich protein 3 also known as cardiac LIM protein (CLP) or muscle LIM protein (MLP) is a protein that in humans is encoded by the CSRP3 gene.

CSRP3 IS a small 194 amino acid protein, which is specifically expressed in skeletal and cardiac muscle. In rodents, CSRP3 has also been found to be expressed in neurons.

== Gene ==
The CSRP3 gene was discovered in rat in 1994. In humans it was mapped to chromosome 11p15.1, where it spans a 20kb genomic region, organized in 6 exons. The full length transcript is 0.8kb, while a splice variant, originating from the alternative splicing of exons 3 and 4, was recently identified and designated MLP-b.

== Structure ==
MLP contains two LIM domains (LIM1 and LIM2), each being surrounded by glycine-rich regions, and the two separated by more than 50 residues. LIM domains offer a remarkable ability for protein-protein interactions. Furthermore, MLP carries a nuclear localization signal at amino acid positions 64-69 MLP can be acetylated/deacetylated at the position 69 lysine residue (K69), by acetyltransferase (PCAF) and histone deacetylase 4 (HDAC4), respectively. In myocytes, MLP has the ability to oligomerize, forming dimers, trimers and tetramers, an attribute that impacts its interactions, localization and function.

== Protein interactions and localization ==
MLP has been identified to bind to an increasing list of proteins, exhibiting variable subcellular localization and diverse functional properties. In particular, MLP interacts with proteins at the:

1. Z-line, including telethonin (T-cap), alpha-actinin (ACTN), cofilin-2 (CFL2), calcineurin, HDAC4, MLP-b as well as to MLP itself;
2. costameres, where it binds to zyxin, integrin linked kinase (ILK) and beta1-spectrin;
3. intercalated discs, where it associates with the nebulin-related anchoring protein (NRAP);
4. nucleus, where it binds to the transcription factors MyoD, myogenin and MRF4.

M-line as well as plasma membrane localization of MLP has also been observed, however, the protein associations mediating this subcellular distribution are currently unknown. These diverse localization patterns and binding partners of MLP suggest a multitude of roles relating both to the striated myocyte cytoskeleton and the nucleus. The role of MLP in each of these two cellular compartments appears to be dynamic, with studies demonstrating nucleocytoplasmic shuttling, driven by its nuclear localization signal, over time and under different conditions.

== Function ==
In the nucleus, MLP acts as a positive regulator of myogenesis and promotes myogenic differentiation. Overexpression of MLP enhances myotube differentiation, an effect attributed to the direct association of MLP with muscle specific transcription factors such as MyoD, myogenin and MRF4 and consequently the transcriptional control of fundamental muscle-specific genes. In the cytoplasm, MLP is an important scaffold protein, implicated in various cytoskeletal macromolecular complexes, at the sarcomeric Z-line, the costameres, and the microfilaments. At the Z-line, MLP interacts with different Z-line components and acts as a scaffold protein promoting the assembly of macromolecular complexes along sarcomeres and actin-based cytoskeleton Moreover, since the Z-line acts as a stretch sensor, MLP is believed to be involved in mechano-signaling processes. Indeed, cardiomyocytes from MLP transgenic or knock-out mouse exhibit defective intrinsic stretch responses, due to selective loss of passive stretch sensing. At the costameres, another region implicated in force transmission, MLP is thought to be contributing in mechanosensing through its interactions with β1 spectrin and zyxin. However, the precise role of MLP at the costameres has not been extensively investigated yet.

At the microfilaments, MLP is implicated in actin remodeling (or actin dynamics) through its interaction with cofilin-2 (CFL2). Binding of MLP to CFL2 enhances the CFL2-dependent F-actin depolymerization, with a recent study demonstrating that MLP can act directly on actin cytoskeleton dynamics through direct binding that stabilizes and crosslinks actin filaments into bundles.

Additionally, MLP is indirectly related to calcium homeostasis and energy metabolism. Specifically, acetylation of MLP increases the calcium sensitivity of myofilaments and regulates contractility, while the absence of MLP causes alterations in calcium signaling (intracellular calcium handling) with defects in excitation-contraction coupling. Furthermore, lack of MLP leads to local loss of mitochondria and energy deficiency.

== Animal studies ==
In rodents, MLP is transiently expressed in amacrine cells of the retina during postnatal development. In the adult nervous system it is expressed upon axonal injury, where it plays an important role during regenerative processes, functioning as an actin cross-linker, thereby facilitating filopodia formation and increasing growth cone motility.

== Clinical significance ==
MLP is directly associated with striated muscle diseases. Mutations in the CSRP3 gene have been detected in patients with dilated cardiomyopathy (DCM) [e.g. G72R and K69R], and hypertrophic cardiomyopathy (HCM) [e.g. L44P, S46R, S54R/E55G, C58G, R64C, Y66C, Q91L, K42/fs165], while the most frequent MLP mutation, W4R, has been found in both of these patient populations. Biochemical and functional studies have been performed for some of these mutant proteins, and reveal aberrant localization and interaction patterns, leading to impaired molecular and cellular functions. For example, the W4R mutation abolishes the MLP/T-cap interaction, leading to mislocalization of T-cap, Z-line instability and severe sarcomeric structural defects. The C58G mutation causes reduced protein stability due to enhanced ubiquitin-dependent proteasome degradation while the K69L mutation, which is within the predicted nuclear localization signal of MLP, abolishes the MLP/α-actinin interaction and causes altered subcellular distribution of the mutant protein, showing predominant perinuclear localization. Alterations in the protein expression levels of MLP, its oligomerization or splicing have also been described in human cardiac and skeletal muscle diseases: both MLP protein levels and oligomerization are down-regulated in human heart failure, while MLP levels are significantly changed in different skeletal myopathies, including facioscapulohumeral muscular dystrophy, nemaline myopathy and limb girdle muscular dystrophy type 2B. Moreover, significant changes in MLP-b protein expression levels, as well as deregulation of the MLP:MLP-b ratio have been detected in limb girdle muscular dystrophy type 2A, Duchenne muscular dystrophy and dermatomyositis patients.

== Animal models ==
Animal models are providing insight into MLP's function in striated muscle. Ablation of Mlp (MLP-/-) in mice affects all striated muscles, although the cardiac phenotype is more severe, leading to alterations in cardiac pressure and volume, aberrant contractility, development of dilated cardiomyopathy with hypertrophy and progressive heart failure. At the histological level there is dramatic disruption of the cardiomyocyte cytoarchitecture at multiple levels, and pronounced fibrosis. Other cellular changes included alterations in intracellular calcium handling, local loss of mitochondria and energy deficiency. Crossing MLP-/- mice with phospholamban (PLN) -/-, or β2-adrenergic receptor (β2-AR) -/-, or angiotensin II type 1a receptor (AT1a) -/-, or β-adrenergic receptor kinase 1 inhibitor (bARK1) -/- mice, as well as overexpressing calcineurin rescued their cardiac function, through a series of only partly understood molecular mechanisms. Conversely crossing MLP-/- mice with β1-adrenergic receptor (β1-AR) -/- mice was lethal, while crossing MLP-/- mice with calcineurin -/- mice, enhanced fibrosis and cardiomyopathy. A gene knockin mouse model harboring the human MLP-W4R mutation developed HCM and heart failure, while ultrastructural analysis of its cardiac tissue revealed myocardial disarray and significant fibrosis, increased nuclear localization of MLP concomitantly with reduced sarcomeric Z-line distribution. Alterations in MLP nucleocytoplasmic shuttling, which are possibly modulated by changes in its oligomerization status, have also been implicated in hypertrophy and heart failure, independently of mutations. Studies in Drosophila revealed that genetic ablation of Mlp84B, the Drosophila homolog of MLP, was associated with pupal lethality and impaired muscle function. Mechanical studies of Mlp84B-null flight muscles indicate that loss of Mlp84B results in decreased muscle stiffness and power generation. Cardiac-specific ablation of Mlp84B caused decreased lifespan, impaired diastolic function and disturbances in cardiac rhythm. Overall, these animal models have provided critical evidence on the functional significance of MLP in striated muscle physiology and pathophysiology.
