= CSRP2 =

Protein-coding gene in humans

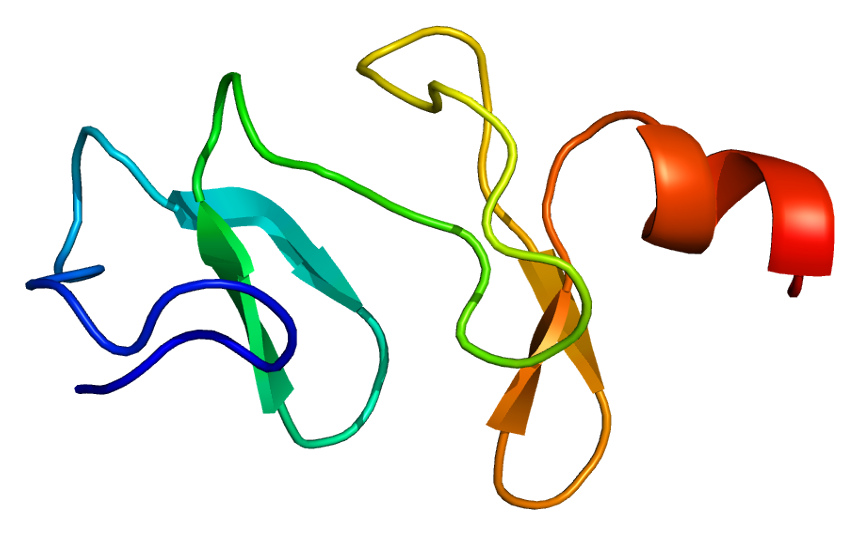

Identifiers
- Aliases: CSRP2, CRP2, LMO5, SmLIM, cysteine and glycine rich protein 2
- External IDs: OMIM: 601871; MGI: 1202907; GeneCards: CSRP2
Available structures
PDB	Ortholog search: PDBe RCSB
PDB	List of PDB id codes 2CU8

Gene location (Human)
Chr.	Chromosome 12 (human)
Band	12q21.2	Start	76,858,709 bp
Band	12q21.2	End	76,879,023 bp

Gene location (Mouse)
Chr.	Chromosome 10 (mouse)
Band	10|10 D1	Start	110,755,650 bp
Band	10|10 D1	End	110,775,483 bp
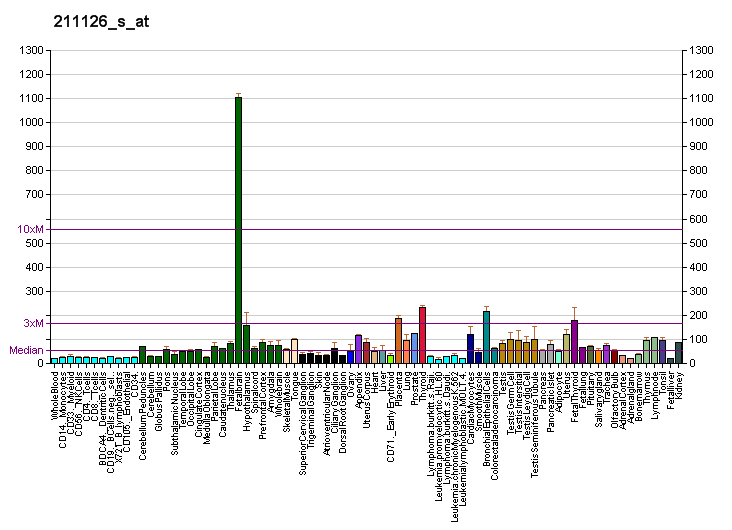

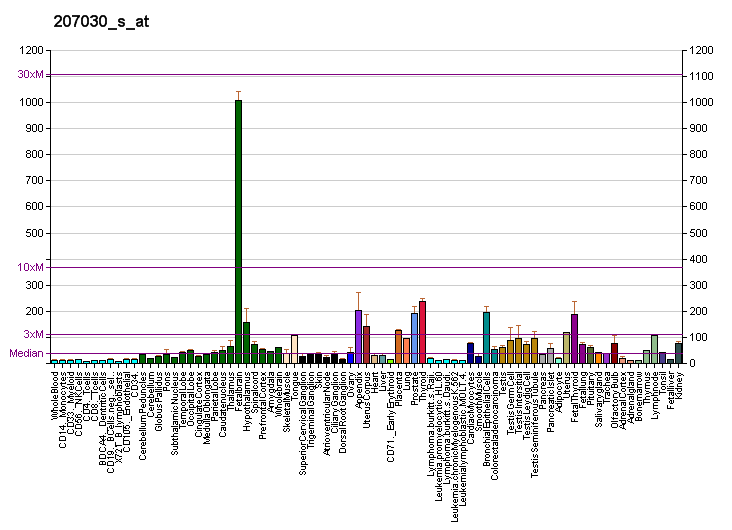
RNA expression pattern
Bgee	Human / Mouse (ortholog); Top expressed in: oocyte; secondary oocyte; ganglionic eminence; tibial arteries; right coronary artery; mucosa of paranasal sinus; parietal pleura; gingival epithelium; gastric mucosa; optic nerve / Top expressed in: ascending aorta; aortic valve; tunica media of zone of aorta; umbilical cord; endocardial cushion; atrium; mandibular prominence; external carotid artery; atrioventricular valve; internal carotid artery; More reference expression data
BioGPS	More reference expression data
Gene ontology
Molecular function	protein binding; metal ion binding; molecular function; structural constituent of muscle; actinin binding
Cellular component	nucleus; focal adhesion; cytoplasm; Z discdkac
Biological process	multicellular organism development; cell differentiation; actin cytoskeleton organization; sarcomere organization; muscle tissue development
Sources:Amigo / QuickGO
Orthologs
Databases	NCBI: entry; OMA: entry
Species	Human	Mouse
Entrez	1466	13008
Ensembl	ENSG00000175183	ENSMUSG00000020186
UniProt	Q16527	P97314
RefSeq (mRNA)	NM_001300965; NM_001321	NM_007792
RefSeq (protein)	NP_001287894; NP_001312	NP_031818
Location (UCSC)	Chr 12: 76.86 – 76.88 Mb	Chr 10: 110.76 – 110.78 Mb
PubMed search
- Wikidata
View/Edit Human	View/Edit Mouse

Cysteine and glycine-rich protein 2 is a protein that in humans is encoded by the CSRP2 gene.

CSRP2 is a member of the CSRP family of genes, encoding a group of LIM domain proteins, which may be involved in regulatory processes important for development and cellular differentiation. CRP2 contains two copies of the cysteine-rich amino acid sequence motif (LIM) with putative zinc-binding activity, and may be involved in regulating ordered cell growth. Other genes in the family include CSRP1 and CSRP3.
