= Sylvain Charlebois =

Canadian academic

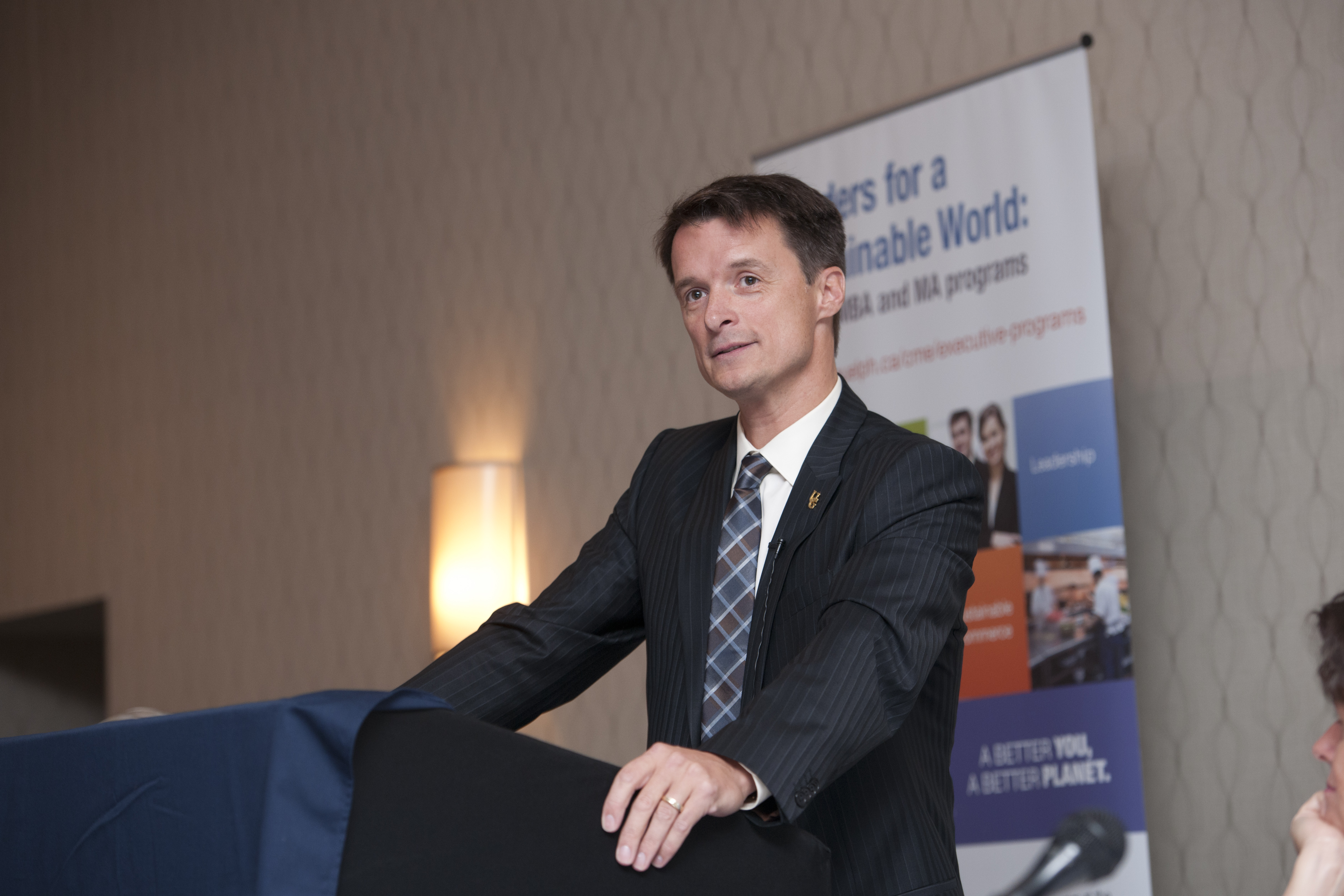
- Born: Farnham, Quebec, Canada
- Other name: The Food Professor
- Education: University of Sherbrooke, DBA; Université du Québec à Montréal, MBA; Royal Military College of Canada, BComm.
- Occupation: Professor of Management
- Employer(s): Dalhousie University, Canada
- Spouse: Janèle Vézeau

Sylvain Charlebois is a Canadian professor and researcher of food distribution and policy at Dalhousie University in Halifax, Nova Scotia. He is a former dean of the university's Faculty of Management. Charlebois, who goes by the moniker "The Food Professor," is the director of the Agri-food Analytics Lab at Dalhousie. Since December 2010, he has been the lead author of Canada's Food Price Report.

== Early life and education ==
Charlebois was raised on a rural farm in Quebec. He has a degree in commerce from the Royal Military College of Canada. He obtained a Master of Business Administration from the Université du Québec à Montréal and a Doctor of Business Administration at the University of Sherbrooke, writing his thesis on mad cow disease's impact on the Canadian beef industry and food distribution.

== Career ==
After getting his doctoral degree, Charlebois moved to Saskatchewan for a teaching position at the University of Regina in 2004. He became associate dean of the Faculty of Business Administration in 2008 and joined the Johnson Shoyama Graduate School of Public Policy, a joint operation between the University of Regina and the University of Saskatchewan, as an associate director the following year. In the 2000s, his research focused on food systems and he began making media appearances as a food expert.

From 2010 to 2016, Charlebois was a professor at the University of Guelph's College of Business and Economics, where he co-founded the Arrell Food Institute. At his college, he served as associate dean of research and graduate studies, executive programs, and academics, as well as a stint as acting dean.

In 2016, he was named dean of the Faculty of Management at Dalhousie University. In 2018, Charlebois became the director of the Agri-food Analytics Lab at Dalhousie, after resigning as dean following an investigation into complaints involving harassment and bullying. Following Charlebois's resignation, a university spokesperson stated that the conclusions of the investigation would remain confidential but that "no further action" would be taken in relation to the investigation.

Charlebois writes a blog for Canadian Grocer magazine called "The Food Professor," and is a co-host of the podcast titled "The Food Professor."

Charlebois and his wife Janèle Vézeau are also co-directors of the Canadian Agri-Food Foresight Institute, a private consulting company in the agri-food industry.

== Studies and publications ==
=== Canada's Food Price Report ===
In 2024, Charlebois was the Project Lead for Canada's Food Price Report, a study on food pricing trends prepared by researchers at Dalhousie University, the University of Guelph, the University of British Columbia and the University of Saskatchewan. An August 2024 paper in Canadian Food Studies found that the Report were "scientifically incomplete" since it did not adequately account for climate change and the impact of corporate decisions on price.

=== Grocery store theft ===
In January 2023 Charlebois penned a commentary on the increase in thefts from supermarkets, and how it raises costs for grocers and leads to higher grocery prices. The piece, and a Twitter post, was met with criticism, and debate about the morality of food theft. Twitter users drew attention to Charlebois' salary from Dalhousie University, and his receipt of a $60,000 grant in 2018 from the Weston Foundation, which is funded by Weston Family companies that include Loblaws, one of Canada's largest grocery retailers. In response, Charlebois said the grant went to Dalhousie University and was used to pay a graduate student; and that people are upset with grocers since, with food inflation over 10 percent, "they're looking for a scapegoat."

=== Carbon pricing and environmental policies ===
Charlebois says he is "pro-carbon tax." However, he recommended pausing the tax until a comprehensive impact assessment was completed. He said the effect on retail prices of carbon pricing in Canada is very difficult to assess, but the program could compromise the competitiveness of Canada's food industry, thereby affecting Canada's food security over time.

In Fall 2023, Charlebois questioned a Bank of Canada analysis of how carbon pricing affected food prices. Also, he said a University of Calgary study that found the British Columbia carbon tax raised average food prices by a third of a percentage point had "severe limitations" since the Statistics Canada data employed may not fully incorporate how the carbon tax affects the entire supply chain. Canadians for Tax Fairness said Charlebois's analysis insufficiently acknowledged the rebate that Canadians received for the carbon tax. Charlebois' criticisms of the carbon tax were cited by the media and the Conservative Party of Canada.

Charlebois has said the federal government's plastic pollution reduction campaign and a fertilizer emissions reduction plan would be likely to raise costs and lead to more international food scarcity.

=== Milk dumping ===
A study co-authored by Charlebois found that between 2012 and 2021, the Canadian dairy industry discarded on farms an estimated 7% of all milk produced (over 6.8 billion liters of raw milk, valued at $6.7 billion). The Canadian Dairy Commission and the chief executive officer of Dairy Farmers of Canada contested the study's data and assumptions, saying the practice takes place only on rare occasions. Charlebois stated to The Globe and Mail that the dairy farming community "is doing nothing" to limit the amount of surplus milk, and that since dairy is under supply management, no waste should be tolerated.

=== Other reports ===
Charlebois has also co-authored reports related to the Canadian Wheat Board’s Daily Price Contract program, Canada's Food Guide, edible cannabis legislation, and public perception towards GMOs.

== Publications ==
- Charlebois, Sylvain (2017). Food Safety, Risk Intelligence and Benchmarking. Wiley. ISBN 978-1-1190-7112-9.
- — (2021). Poutine Nation. Fides. ISBN 978-2-7621-4411-6.
- — (2022). La Révolution Des Protéines (in French). Montreal: Les Éditions de l'Homme. ISBN 978-2-7619-6012-0.
- — (2023). La Part du Gâteau (in French). Fides. ISBN 978-2-7621-4602-8.
