= CSRP1 =

Protein-coding gene in humans

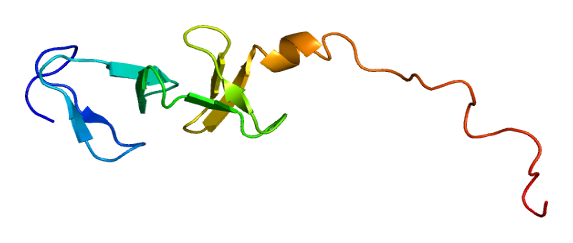

Identifiers
- Aliases: CSRP1, CRP, CRP1, CSRP, CYRP, D1S181E, HEL-141, HEL-S-286, cysteine and glycine rich protein 1
- External IDs: OMIM: 123876; MGI: 88549; GeneCards: CSRP1

Gene location (Human)
Chr.	Chromosome 1 (human)
Band	1q32.1	Start	201,483,530 bp
Band	1q32.1	End	201,509,456 bp

Gene location (Mouse)
Chr.	Chromosome 1 (mouse)
Band	1|1 E4	Start	135,647,799 bp
Band	1|1 E4	End	135,679,970 bp
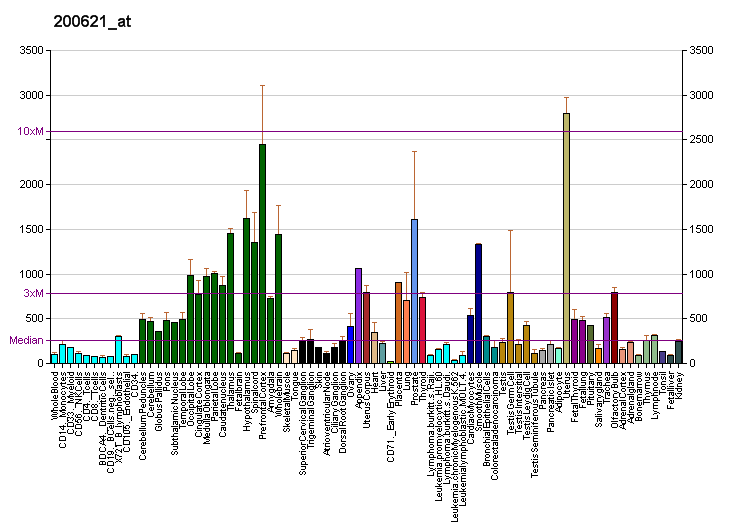
RNA expression pattern
Bgee	Human / Mouse (ortholog); Top expressed in: popliteal artery; tibial arteries; right coronary artery; muscle layer of sigmoid colon; saphenous vein; body of uterus; left uterine tube; gastric mucosa; tail of epididymis; smooth muscle tissue / Top expressed in: ascending aorta; aortic valve; tunica media of zone of aorta; seminal vesicula; uterus; deep cerebellar nuclei; globus pallidus; umbilical cord; pyloric antrum; lateral geniculate nucleus; More reference expression data
BioGPS	More reference expression data
Gene ontology
Molecular function	metal ion binding; RNA binding; zinc ion binding
Cellular component	extracellular exosome; focal adhesion; nucleus
Biological process	platelet aggregation
Sources:Amigo / QuickGO
Orthologs
Databases	NCBI: entry; OMA: entry
Species	Human	Mouse
Entrez	1465	13007
Ensembl	ENSG00000159176	ENSMUSG00000026421
UniProt	P21291	P97315
RefSeq (mRNA)	NM_004078; NM_001144773; NM_001193570; NM_001193571; NM_001193572	NM_007791; NM_001360782
RefSeq (protein)	NP_001180499; NP_001180500; NP_001180501; NP_004069	NP_031817; NP_001347711
Location (UCSC)	Chr 1: 201.48 – 201.51 Mb	Chr 1: 135.65 – 135.68 Mb
PubMed search
- Wikidata
View/Edit Human	View/Edit Mouse

Cysteine and glycine-rich protein 1 is a protein that in humans is encoded by the CSRP1 gene.

CSRP1 is a member of the CSRP family of genes encoding a group of LIM domain proteins, which may be involved in regulatory processes important for development and cellular differentiation. The LIM/double zinc-finger motif found in CRP1 is found in a group of proteins with critical functions in gene regulation, cell growth, and somatic differentiation Other genes in the family include CSRP2 and CSRP3.
