= NRAP =

Protein-coding gene in the species Homo sapiens

Identifiers
- Aliases: NRAP, N-RAP, nebulin related anchoring protein
- External IDs: OMIM: 602873; MGI: 1098765; GeneCards: NRAP

Gene location (Human)
Chr.	Chromosome 10 (human)
Band	10q25.3	Start	113,588,714 bp
Band	10q25.3	End	113,664,070 bp

Gene location (Mouse)
Chr.	Chromosome 19 (mouse)
Band	19 D2|19 51.8 cM	Start	56,308,467 bp
Band	19 D2|19 51.8 cM	End	56,378,469 bp
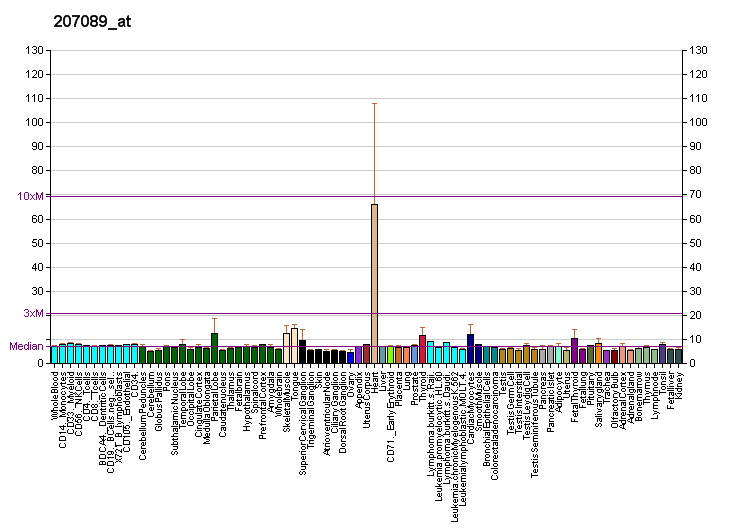
RNA expression pattern
Bgee	Human / Mouse (ortholog); Top expressed in: Skeletal muscle tissue of rectus abdominis; muscle of thigh; glutes; gastrocnemius muscle; apex of heart; body of tongue; Skeletal muscle tissue of biceps brachii; triceps brachii muscle; thoracic diaphragm; ventricle of the heart / Top expressed in: ankle; muscle of thigh; soleus muscle; temporal muscle; triceps brachii muscle; plantaris muscle; extensor digitorum longus muscle; tibialis anterior muscle; medial head of gastrocnemius muscle; digastric muscle; More reference expression data
BioGPS	More reference expression data
Gene ontology
Molecular function	actin binding; metal ion binding; muscle alpha-actinin binding; protein binding; actin filament binding
Cellular component	fascia adherens; muscle tendon junction; Z discdkac
Biological process	biological process; cardiac muscle thin filament assembly
Sources:Amigo / QuickGO
Orthologs
Databases	NCBI: entry; OMA: entry
Species	Human	Mouse
Entrez	4892	18175
Ensembl	ENSG00000197893	ENSMUSG00000049134
UniProt	Q86VF7	Q80XB4
RefSeq (mRNA)	NM_001261463; NM_006175; NM_198060; NM_001322945	NM_001286552; NM_008733; NM_198059
RefSeq (protein)	NP_001248392; NP_001309874; NP_006166; NP_932326	NP_001273481; NP_032759; NP_932307; NP_001390105; NP_001390107 NP_001390109; NP_001390113; NP_001390114; NP_001390115; NP_001390116; NP_001390117; NP_001390119; NP_001390120; NP_001390121; NP_001390122; NP_001390123; NP_001390124; NP_001390125
Location (UCSC)	Chr 10: 113.59 – 113.66 Mb	Chr 19: 56.31 – 56.38 Mb
PubMed search
- Wikidata
View/Edit Human	View/Edit Mouse

Nebulin-related-anchoring protein (N-RAP) is a protein that in humans is encoded by the NRAP gene. N-RAP is a muscle-specific isoform belonging to the nebulin family of proteins. This family is composed of 5 members: N-RAP, nebulin, nebulette, LASP-1 and LASP-2. N-RAP is involved in both myofibrillar myogenesis during development and cell-cell connections in mature muscle.

== Structure ==
N-RAP is a 197 kDa protein composed of 1730 amino acids. As a member of the nebulin family of proteins, N-RAP is characterized by 35 amino acid stretches of ‘‘nebulin repeats’’, which are actin binding domains containing a conserved SDxxYK motif. Like nebulin, groups of seven single repeats within N-RAP form “super repeats”, which incorporate a single conserved motif WLKGIGW at the end of the third repeat. A unique feature of NRAP relative to nebulin is its N-terminal cysteine-rich LIM domain, a feature shared with LASP-1 and LASP-2.

== Function ==
An important role has been implicated for N-RAP in myofibrilar organization during cardiomyocyte development. It is clear that NRAP is critical for normal α-actinin-dependent organization of myofibrils in cardiomyocytes, as knock-down of N-RAP protein levels causes myofbrillar disassembly in embryonic cardiomyocytes. Specifically, studies suggest that NRAP super repeats may be an essential scaffold for organizing alpha-actinin and actin into sarcomereic I-Z-I complexes in premyofibrils, and dynamic imaging studies have shown that N-RAP departs from the I-Z-I complexes upon completion of actin thin filament assembly. In adult cardiac muscle, N-RAP colocalizes to intercalated discs, where it functions to anchor terminal actin filaments to the sarcolemma. It has been suggested that its role in adult muscle is force transduction from the sarcomere to the extracellular matrix.

== Clinical significance ==
Though no known direct link exists between N-RAP mutations and human cardiomyopathies, N-RAP has been shown to be significantly upregulated in murine models of dilated cardiomyopathy. This has been hypothesized to be an adaptive response to correct for disorganized actin thin filament architecture at intercalated disc junctions in cardiomyocytes during dilated cardiomyopathy.
