= Canadian health claims for food =

A health claim found on a food labels and in food marketing is a claim by a food manufacturer that their product will reduce the risk of developing a disease or condition.

Health claims for food in Canada are overseen by Health Canada, the Government of Canada department responsible for national health. Health Canada has allowed 5 scientifically verified disease risk reduction claims to be used on food labels and on food advertising. Other countries, including the United States and Great Britain, have approved similar health claims on food labels.

== Regulations ==
The Food Directorate of Health Canada is responsible for the development of policies, regulations and standards that relate to the use of health claims on foods. They assess whether health claims are truthful and not misleading by reviewing mandatory and voluntary pre-market submissions. Health Claims are regulated under the Food and Drugs Act and the Food and Drug Regulations. The Section 5(1) of the Food and Drugs Act requires that all health claims be truthful and not misleading or deceptive. The regulatory requirements permitting the use of claims vary significantly depending on the nature and type of the claim. Some claims may be made without pre-market approval provided they are truthful and not misleading or deceptive, whereas other claims, such as disease risk reduction or therapeutic claims are only allowed once a regulatory amendment specifying the conditions for their use has been completed

Manufacturers are responsible for the accuracy of all information on the labels and advertisements for food and for compliance with all relevant food legislation and policies, including those pertaining to health claims. The Canadian Food Inspection Agency is responsible for ensuring that industry complies with these requirements

== Types of approved claims ==
Food claims express the composition, quality, quantity or origin of a food product. Examples of food claims are "Made in Canada", "Home-style Chilli", and "Fresh Pasta".

Nutrition (nutrient content) claims characterize the energy value of the food or the amount of a nutrient contained in a food. It provides a quick and easy way to identify foods with specific nutritional features of interest. Examples of nutrition claims are "low in sodium", "sodium free", and "100 Calories per serving".

Health claims are any representation in labeling or advertising that states, suggests, or implies that a relationship exists between consumption of a food or an ingredient in the food and a person's health.

There are two categories of health claims: General Health Claims and Specific Health Claims.

General health claims are broad, general claims that promote health through healthy eating or that provide dietary guidance. These claims do not refer to a specific or general health effect, disease, or health condition. For example, the claim "Include low fat product "x" as part of healthy eating" "healthy for you" or "healthy choice"

=== Specific health claims ===
==== Disease risk reduction and therapeutic claims ====
Since 2003, Health Canada has allowed certain disease risk reduction claims to be used on food labels or in advertisements. These claims are used to describe the link between the characteristics of a diet, a food or food constituent and the risk reduction of a disease or the therapeutic effect of a food or food constituent or diet, (including restoring, correcting, or modifying body functions). Example: The claim "(naming the diet characteristics, food or food constituent) reduces the risk of heart disease" or "lowers blood cholesterol" can be used when the food carrying the claim meets conditions for use set out in the food regulations.

==== Function claims ====
These claims are used to describe the specific physiological effects of foods and food constituents associated with health or performance. Example: The claim "(naming the food or food constituent) promotes regularity or laxation" can be used for coarse wheat bran providing a minimum of 7 grams of dietary fibre in a reasonable daily intake of the food.

Nutrient function claims (formerly known as biological role claims), are a type of function claim that describe the well-established functions of nutrients or energy necessary for the maintenance of good health, normal growth and development Example: The claim "Calcium aids in the formation and maintenance of bones and teeth" may be used for foods providing a minimum of 5% of the Recommended Daily Intake of the nutrient per serving of stated size and reference amount of the food.

== Approved claims ==
=== "A healthy diet low in sodium and high in potassium can reduce the risk of high blood pressure" ===
==== Measurements of dietary sodium ====
Dietary sodium can be measured in two ways. Total dietary sodium measures the amount (in grams or milligrams) of sodium in the food. Sodium ratio refers to the amount of sodium per amount of food eaten, usually in grams per kilocalorie, or milligrams per kilocalorie.

Dietary potassium can be measured as the total amount of potassium in the diet (usually in milligrams). It can also be measured in relation to sodium intake as the potassium-sodium ratio, in mg K/mg Na, or mg K/g Na. Only this last measurement shows the effect of dietary potassium as part of the equation; the rest measure only sodium intake, which is less important overall than the combined effects of potassium and sodium.

==== DASH diet ====
Dietary Approaches to Stop Hypertension (DASH) is a dietary intervention designed to reduce blood pressure in patients with hypertension. It emphasizes fruits and vegetables, low-fat dairy products, whole grains, poultry, nuts and fish, and limits red meats, sweets and sweetened drinks. It has been found to reduce hypertension in patients even without weight loss or reduction of sodium intake. However, it is usually used in combination with a sodium-controlled diet.

==== Supporting research ====
Most research has shown that reducing sodium intake reduces the risk of cardiovascular disease(CVD) and all-cause mortality rate.

A study by Langford in 1983 observed that populations that consume less sodium also tend to have relatively high potassium intake, and a lower rate of CVD. Within the USA, he also noticed racial and class differences in CVD, which he suggests may be due to sodium being cheaper to acquire in the diet than potassium, since many products contain added salt. Reddy and Katan recommend a salt intake below 5 g/day (5000 mg/day), and to increase potassium intake by 2 - 3 g/day. The study emphasizes that this should be done through dietary changes, rather than by taking a dietary supplement containing potassium.

He et al. observed in 1999 that increased salt consumption had a direct relationship to increased risk of CVD and all-cause mortality in overweight people.

Cook et al. observed patients 10–15 years after they had received treatments for prehypertension. They found that reducing sodium intake by 1.2 g/day reduced the number of people needing anti-hypertension treatment by 50%. Subjects who had no hypertension when they began the study 10 – 15 years earlier were also 50% less likely to require treatment for hypertension.

Their results suggest that increased sodium intake can cause CVD independently of hypertension - that is, even if the patient continues to have normal blood pressure. High sodium intake is associated with increased vascular reactivity and growth, and myocardial fibrosis, which is associated with myocardial disarray. They also noticed a direct relationship between sodium intake and ventricular hypertrophy, an increase in the mass of the left ventricle of the heart. In lay terms, this means an enlargement of the heart chamber that pumps blood to body tissues, including the cardiac muscle itself. In order to reduce blood pressure, and prevent hypertension and CVD, Cook et al. recommend reducing sodium intake by 25 - 30% from current levels.

Increasing dietary potassium intake has been shown to have a significant effect on blood pressure in populations with high sodium intake. It is not apparent from the study performed by Khaw et al. whether there is a difference for populations consuming low amounts of sodium; however, this is not particularly relevant in Canada, where people are more likely to consume excess sodium.

==== Dietary sources of sodium ====
In 2007, Joffres et al. reported that in the typical Canadian diet, 11% of sodium occurs naturally, 12% is added during cooking and at the table, and 77% is added by industry during processing. Their study was to determine whether regulations to limit the amount of salt added by food manufacturers could reduce the prevalence of hypertension by 30%, which would substantially reduce Canadian health care costs.

==== Opposing research ====
Some Studies do not recommend that the general healthy population should reduce their sodium intake because they feel that there is no conclusive evidence that this will guarantee a lower incidence of hypertension. A major study with this recommendation is the National Health and Nutrition Examination Survey (NHANES I). They did observe that people with a lower-sodium diet had a lower all-cause mortality and cardiovascular disease (CVD) -related mortality rate. However, because they could not be certain that reducing sodium intake could reduce hypertension and CVD, and it was not just one factor in the lifestyles of people who naturally ate a lower-sodium diet, they did not feel a need to recommend that the general population should reduce sodium intake.

The Developers of the DASH diet do not recommend reducing dietary sodium, because they found that the overall DASH diet is effective even without reducing sodium intake. That is, an overall healthy diet is more important than only reducing sodium intake, even in regulating hypertension. A 1996 study by Midgley et al. recommends a reduction in sodium intake for older patients with hypertension, but does not support recommendations for the general population to reduce their sodium intake.

As mentioned above, sodium intake can have cardiovascular effects without hypertension. It is therefore prudent to reduce sodium intake even if blood pressure is normal. It is important to consume an overall healthy diet that essentially follows the Canada Food Guide. Reducing sodium intake to recommended levels can reduce the risk of future hypertension and cardiovascular problems, and reduction of sodium intake carries no inherent risk. Because most of the sodium we consume is added during processing, preparing healthy meals at home and adding salt during cooking, rather than purchasing ready meals and snacks, is an easy way to reduce sodium intake without compromising the flavour and texture that salt provides in food.

==== Summary ====
Most studies to date have shown that reducing sodium intake and increasing potassium intake, to levels recommended in Canadian nutritional guidelines such as RDA, can reduce the risk of hypertension, cardiovascular disease, and all-cause mortality. Most dietary sodium in Canada is added by food manufacturers during processing, and regulations controlling the amount of salt that can be added by food manufacturers may help reduce the prevalence of these illnesses in Canada.

=== "A healthy diet with adequate calcium and vitamin D may reduce the risk of osteoporosis" ===
In order to make the health claim "A healthy diet adequate in calcium and vitamin D, and regular physical activity, help to achieve strong bones and may reduce the risk of osteoporosis, the food must be:

- high or very high in calcium,
- may also be very high in Vitamin D,
- cannot have more Phosphorus than Calcium,
- must be limited in Alcohol, and
- must have more than 40 kcal (unless it is a fruit or vegetable.

==== Nutrition and bone health ====
The two main calcium centers in the body are found in bones and blood. Homeostatic controls of the body ensure that the blood maintains a constant proportion of Ca^{++}. If there is a decrease in serum calcium levels, the body responds by secreting Parathormone (PTH) from the parathyroid gland into the blood which;

1)Increases re-absorption of Ca^{++} from the kidneys and gastrointestinal tract(GI)

2)Releases calcium from bones into the blood

Vitamin D also plays a crucial role in maintaining serum calcium levels (Ca^{++} in the blood). Vitamin D stimulates absorption of calcium from the GI tract through its interaction with receptors in the enterocyte. Vitamin D also increases transcription of genes that code for Calbindin. As the name implies, Calbindin functions as a calcium-binding protein thereby enhancing calcium absorption. As a result of the body scavenging for calcium from bones; the bones may become fragile, brittle and weak, which in prolonged states can lead to osteoporosis and or bone fractures.

Conversely, if there is an adequate level of Ca^{++} in the blood, PTH will be inhibited. Similarly, in the case where there is an excess of Ca^{++} in the blood, it will be stored in bones as this is the nutritional reserve for Calcium and Phosphorus

Bone depends upon dietary intake to supply the bulk materials needed for synthesis of the extracellular material, which composes more than 95% of bone. These bulk materials are mainly calcium, phosphorus and protein. Roughly half the volume of the extracellular material of bone consists of protein and the other half of calcium phosphate crystals. It is self-evident that a growing organism cannot amass this structural material if the bulk components of bone are not present in adequate amounts in the diet. It is for this reason that bone growth is stunted during general malnutrition and specific bone abnormalities develop with deficiencies in protein, ascorbic acid, vitamin D, magnesium, zinc, copper and manganese to name only a few

==== Supporting research ====
There is a significant body of evidence which establishes that high calcium intakes augment bone gain during growth, retards age-related bone loss, and reduces osteoporotic fracture risk. A meta-analysis study in 2007 assessed whether calcium supplementation can reduce osteoporotic fractures. The meta-analysis included all the randomized trials in which calcium, or calcium in combination with vitamin D, was used to prevent fracture and osteoporotic bone loss.

In total, 63 897 individuals were analysed, most of whom were women (n=58 785 [92%]) with a mean age of 67.8 years (SD 9.7). In trials that reported fracture as an outcome (17 trials, n=52 625), treatment was associated with a 12% risk reduction in fractures of all types. In trials that reported bone-mineral density as an outcome (23 trials, n=41 419), the treatment was associated with a reduced rate of bone loss of 0.54% (0.35–0.73; p<0.0001) at the hip and 1.19% (0.76–1.61%; p<0.0001) in the spine. The fracture risk reduction was significantly greater (24%) in trials in which the compliance rate was high (p<0.0001). The treatment effect was better with calcium doses of 1200 mg or more than with doses less than 1200 mg (0.80 vs 0.94; p=0.006), and with vitamin D doses of 800 IU or more than with doses less than 800 IU (0·84 vs 0·87; p=0·03).

Evidence supports the use of calcium, or calcium in combination with vitamin D supplementation, in the preventive treatment of osteoporosis in people aged 50 years or older. For best therapeutic effect, minimum doses of 1200 mg of calcium, and 800 IU of vitamin D (for combined calcium plus vitamin D supplementation is recommended.

==== Dietary recommendations ====
Current recommendations for Calcium are:

- 1,000 mg per day for people aged 19–50 years
- 1,200 mg per day for people over the age of 51 years.

The Upper Tolerable intake is 2.5 g/day

=== "A healthy diet low in saturated and trans fat reduces the risk of heart disease" ===
The Canadian health claim "A healthy diet low in saturated and trans fat and reduced risk of heart disease" is commonly accepted and correlated. Saturated fatty acids do not contain any carbon-to-carbon double bonds in the fatty acid chain. Trans fatty acids contain carbon-to-carbon double bonds in the trans confirmation.

During the past several decades, reduction of fat intake has been one of the main focuses from a dietary perspective. During these decades, fats have been progressively gaining a greater correlation with health complications especially heart disease. Subsequently, the food industry had been taking notice of this, more labels like "fat-free" or "low-fat" appeared on food packaging.

==== Supporting research ====
80,082 women who were between 34 and 59 years of age having no known stroke, cancer, coronary heart disease, hypercholesterolemia, or diabetes in 1980 were studied regarding dietary fat intake and its correlation with coronary heart disease. They found that with each 5% increase of energy intake from saturated fat with the same energy intake from carbohydrates was associated with a 17% increase in the risk of coronary heart disease.

A related study found that the types of fat consumed is much more important than the amount of fat which is consumed with regards to coronary heart disease. Controlled clinical trials have proved that replacing saturated fat with polyunsaturated fat was much more effective in lowering serum cholesterol and reducing risk of CHD compared to reducing total fat consumption.

When compared to saturated fatty acids, trans-fatty acids have a much greater ability to turn High-density lipoprotein (HDL) into Low-density lipoprotein (LDL). HDL commonly referred to as a "good cholesterol" due to its ability to remove cholesterol from clogs in arteries. LDL subsequently is known as a "bad cholesterol" since high levels of it is usually an indication of heart disease. The loss of HDL and creation of LDL is highly likely to lead to CHD complications.

==== Beneficial fatty acids ====
Despite the fact that trans-fatty acids are not saturated, does not correlate to all unsaturated fats lead to CHD. Omega-3 fatty acids are polyunsaturated cis-fatty acids which are an essential fatty acid which the body cannot produce. They are found to prevent and manage cardiovascular disease in clinical interventions. They do not change serum lipid concentrations but reduce blood clotting in vessel walls.

==== Canada's Food Guide recommendations ====
Canada's Food Guide recommends 30–45 mL consumption of unsaturated fat each day to get the fat you require for the day. This amount includes oil used for cooking, salad dressings, margarine and mayonnaise.

Examples of unsaturated vegetable oils they included were:

- canola
- corn
- flaxseed
- olive
- peanut
- soybean
- sunflower

Canada's Food Guide also recommends limiting the consumption of food and beverages high in saturated and trans fat.

=== "A healthy diet rich in vegetables and fruits may reduce the risk of some types of cancer" ===
Scientific literature shows that consuming a "variety" of fruits and vegetables is linked with reduction of some cancers. There is insufficient evidence to support any one fruit/vegetable or food constituent with a reduction of cancer occurrence. Fruits and vegetables have a wide range of nutrients and phytochemicals, thus to achieve optimal nutrient levels a variety is recommended. Some types of cancer signifies that not all types of cancers are diet related and thus not all types of cancer can be reduced by a dietary change. The statement "may help" eliminates consumer confusion that diet is the only factors in reducing risk of some types of cancers. The wording of this disease reduction health claim cannot be modified in any way. However, words, numbers or signs can be added before or after the claim, provided that they do not change the nature of the claim.

==== Regulations ====
This claim is only allowed on certain fruits and vegetables listed below:

- Fresh, frozen, canned or dried vegetable
- Fresh, frozen, canned or dried fruit
- Vegetable or fruit juice
- Combination of the foods listed above

This claim is not allowed on some fruits and vegetables:

- Potatoes, yams, cassava, plantain, corn, mushrooms, mature legumes and their juices*
- Vegetable or fruit used as condiments, garnishes or flavourings- including maraschino cherries, glace fruit, candied fruit and onion flakes
- Jams or jam type spreads, marmalades, preserves and jellies
- Olives
- Powdered vegetable or fruit

*Mature seeds of legumes such as kidney beans are excluded from this claim, however young and immature pods of legumes such as edible podded peas. Additionally, the food cannot contain 0.5% alcohol or less. The claim is not extended to those foods because there is insufficient scientific evidence about any beneficial properties.

==== Benefits of fruits and vegetables ====
Fruits and vegetables may reduce the risk of some types of cancer due to:

1)Beneficial properties of the micronutrients in fruits and vegetables such as vitamins, minerals, antioxidants 2)Consumption of fruits and vegetables may decrease the consumption of other less healthy alternatives

==== Canadian intake of fruits and vegetables ====
According to Statistics Canada during 2008 Canadians ate an average of 79.5 kg vegetables per person, about 4 kg lower than in 2005 when Canadians consumed 83.5 kg per person. Potatoes were the most consumed vegetable with 44%, followed by carrots, lettuce onions and tomatoes which marked a cumulative 29% of all vegetables consumed. During 2008 fruit consumption in Canada increased to a record high 47.5 kg per person. Fresh fruit consumption remains the same as in previous years; however, processed fruit consumption increased by 7%. Berries such as strawberries, cranberries, blackberries and blueberries have had a substantial consumption increase to 5 kg by Canadians in 2008. Oranges also remain a major part of fruit consumption at 4.9 kg per person.

==== Canada's Food Guide recommendations ====
The recommended number of daily servings in healthy adults aged 19–50 is 7-8 servings for women and 8-10 servings for men. Consumption of a "variety" of fruits and vegetables is emphasized as well as consumption of whole foods rather than their juices. Also recommended is to have at least one dark green and one orange vegetable per day. Moreover, the Canada Food Guide suggests that Canadians should consume fruits and vegetables with little or no added salt, sugar or fat.

==== Supporting research ====
Scientific studies have found a relationship between some cancers and fruit and vegetable intake and are the basis for making it one of Canada's five Health Claims. Some studies have looked at overall intake of fruits and vegetables and its relationship with certain types of cancer. Other studies have looked at specific nutrients found in certain fruits and vegetables, such as Vitamins, Minerals and antioxidants and their relationship with cancer. A review conducted by the World Cancer Research Fund and the American Institute for Cancer Research has concluded that there is a considerable amount of convincing evidence to support the claim suggesting a protective effect of fruits and vegetables against some cancers.

A diet rich in fruits and vegetables are found to have a protective effect and reduce the occurrence of breast cancer. An analysis of 12-case control studies has been conducted in Oxford and found that fruits and vegetables have a consistent protective effect against breast cancer. In particular scholars found that Vitamin C intake had the most statistically significant inverse association with breast cancer. The study concludes that if this relationship represents causality then it is estimated that breast cancer might be prevented in 24% of postmenopausal women and 16% of pre-menopausal women.

There is an established relationship between cancer of the upper aero-digestive tract (oral cavity, pharynx, larynx and esophagus) and fruit and vegetable consumption. An EPIC (European Prospective Investigation into Cancer and Nutrition) study was conducted during 1992-1998 in which 345,904 people were studied using a dietary questionnaire. During 1998 data was collected and an inverse association was found between fruit and vegetable intake and upper aero-digestive tract cancer occurrence. The large study recommends an increase of fruit and vegetable consumption in order to reduce the risk of cancers of the upper aero-digestive tract.

Some fruits and vegetables contain antioxidants which are also linked with cancer reduction risks. Micronutrient antioxidants (Vitamin E, Vitamin C, Vitamin A, B-carotene, lycopene) neutralize free radicals in the body and thus prevent cell damage and oxidative damage to DNA. The Journal of Internal medicine published a paper in 2007 which reviews 41 studies conducted concerning Vitamin C and Vitamin E and their role in cancer prevention and treatment. Thirty eight studies did show statistically insufficient beneficial effects of Vitamin E and C on cancer patients. Three of the studies show that there are statistically significant beneficial results. Overall, the systemic review of literature does not support the hypothesis that increased intake of Vitamin E and C (in the form of supplements) can help prevent or treat cancer and that more studies need to be done.

A study published in the Journal of the National Cancer Institute was done on 1300 prostate cancer patients. Overall the risk of prostate cancer was unaffected by receiving dietary supplemental antioxidants. However, the results in smokers show that an increase in Vitamin E and B-carotene are statistically significant and are associated with reduced risk of the disease.

Lycopene is a strong antioxidant found in large quantities in tomatoes as well as other red fruits and vegetables. It has recently been a subject of great research concerning many potential beneficial properties in the human body. There has been some research suggesting that it may reduce the risk of some types of cancer including colorectal, lung and cervical cancer. However, a review done by the U.S. Food and Drug Administration (FDA) in 2007 looks at 168 research studies and concludes that there is insufficient evidence to support a relationship of lycopene and a reduction of any cancer.

Overall, no single nutrient has been found to reduce the risk of cancer. However, a definite correlation has been found in fruit and vegetable intake and reduced risk of cancer, therefore, consumption of a variety of fruits and vegetables is recommended. Due to an extensive and conclusive research done in this area, Canada has officially made this a Disease Reduction Health Claim in 1997. However, much more research needs to be done in order to identify which chemicals in fruits and vegetables are responsible for a reduced risk of cancer.

=== "Non-fermentable carbohydrates in gums and hard candies can reduce dental caries" ===
==== Product labelling regulations ====
According to Health Canada, the "chewing gums, confectionery, or breath freshening products" are the only types of products that may contain this health claim. As follows, the following phrases are allowed to be printed on the mentioned product packaging.

Allowed phrases:

- "Won't cause cavities"
- "Does not promote tooth decay"
- "Does not promote dental caries"
- "Non-cariogenic"
- "Tooth friendly" (this phrase is allowed to be printed with one of the previous phrases)

In addition to the product type specificity, the products must contain one or more of these non-cariogenic sweeteners also known as non-fermentable carbohydrates.

Allowed sweeteners:

- "xylitol, sorbitol, sorbitol syrup, mannitol, maltitol, maltitol syrup, isomalt, lactitol, hydrogenated starch hydrolysates, acesulfame K, aspartame, or sucralose"

==== Involvement of bacteria in development of dental caries ====
The main culprits in creation of dental caries are cariogenic microorganisms such as streptococcus mutans and sugar (see dental caries for detailed explanation of tooth cavity formation).

==== Supporting research ====
There are several studies that show the positive effect of non-fermentable carbohydrates such as xylitol and sorbitol, the most commonly used sugar substitutes in gums and candies, on the reduction of dental caries.

In one study in Belize done on 1277 school children of the mean age of 10.2 years, which were given gums with the contents of either xylitol, xylitol-sorbitol, sorbitol, or sucrose to chew under teachers' supervision daily. After a dental exam after 16, 28, and 40 months, the results showed the most significant reduction in dental caries by the consumption of the xylitol gum (Relative Risk = 0.27). For the sorbitol gum the RR = 0.74 while the sucrose gum increased the incidence of dental caries (RR = 1.20).

In another study in Belize done on six-year-old children given xylitol or sorbitol pellets to chew, the results showed the Relative Risk to be 0.35 and 0.44 relative. This study shows that although both xylitol and sorbitol are effective in reduction of incidence of dental caries, xylitol is more effective.

A study done on school children in Estonia, that were either given xylitol gums or hard candies to chew/eat for three and two years respectively, the results showed overall results in reduction caries rates versus the control group to be 53.5% for gums and 33-59% for candies.

Overall, all these studies and more, show that non-fermentable carbohydrates can reduce dental caries, but let's look at one study that didn't get quite the same results.

==== Opposing research ====
This one study in Madagascar done on school children in grades 1 and 4 were given a "school-based oral health education program". In addition to that all children had to undergo supervised toothbrushing daily. The group was then split into control group and test group where the test group received two types of gum to chew 3-5 times a day. One type of gum was polyol while the other contained a mix of sorbitol (55.5%), xylitol (4.3%), and carbamide (2.3%). After 3 years of this program, the results of the dental exams showed no significant difference between the test and control groups. It is thought that due to the daily supervised toothbrushing, the groups were similar in their overall oral hygiene and therefore the significant difference between the results was reduced.

== Claims under consideration ==
1. A healthy diet rich in a variety of vegetables, fruit and whole grain products and reduced risk of heart disease; and
2. A diet rich in folate along with a daily folic acid supplement and reduced risk of having a baby with a birth defect of the brain or spinal cord

For the past decades, lack of folate (vitamin B9) had been linked to risk of having a baby with a birth defect of the brain or spinal cord (specifically neural tube defect). Neural tube defect is the most common brain and spinal cord related defect in Canada today. In a randomized controlled double-blind trial in South Wales, 44 women who had one child with neural tube defect, took 4 mg. of folic acid a day before and during pregnancy. This resulted in no recurrences amongst these who received supplementation. Concluding that folic acid supplementation might be an effective method of neural tube defect prevention.

In another related study, it was stated that folic acid prevents 70 percent of neural tube defects but its mode of action is unclear. Not fully understanding the mechanism of how folate prevents neural tube defects may be a concern that is preventing Canada from allowing it to be a health claim. Also, if this becomes a health claim it will be the first Canadian health claim recommending a natural health product supplement. Thus, more research on this topic is required to insure safety to Canadians.
