= Sporadic =

The qualification sporadic, indicating that occurrences of some phenomenon are rare and not systematic, can be used for:

== Mathematics ==
- Sporadic group, any of a small number of finite groups that do not fit into any infinite family of groups

== Medicine ==
- Sporadic disease, one with no recognisable pattern

== Science ==
- Sporadic E propagation, an unusual form of radio propagation occasionally allowing long-distance communication
- Sporadic meteor, not part of a meteor swarm
- Sporadic permafrost, discontinuous permafrost that covers only a fraction of an area
