= Nebulette =

Protein-coding gene in the species Homo sapiens

NEBL

Identifiers
- Aliases: NEBL, nebulette, LASP2, LNEBL
- External IDs: OMIM: 605491; MGI: 1921353; GeneCards: NEBL
Available structures
PDB	Ortholog search: PDBe RCSB
PDB	List of PDB id codes 4F14

Gene location (Human)
Chr.	Chromosome 10 (human)
Band	10p12.31	Start	20,779,973 bp
Band	10p12.31	End	21,174,187 bp

Gene location (Mouse)
Chr.	Chromosome 2 (mouse)
Band	2|2 A3	Start	17,343,909 bp
Band	2|2 A3	End	17,731,464 bp
RNA expression pattern
Bgee	Human / Mouse (ortholog); Top expressed in: right ventricle; myocardium; myocardium of left ventricle; optic nerve; cardiac muscle tissue of right atrium; apex of heart; glomerulus; metanephric glomerulus; right auricle of heart; Brodmann area 23 / Top expressed in: interventricular septum; atrium; myocardium of ventricle; atrioventricular valve; vestibular sensory epithelium; ciliary body; right lung lobe; left lung lobe; mammillary body; deep cerebellar nuclei; More reference expression data
BioGPS	n/a
Gene ontology
Molecular function	filamin binding; cytoskeletal protein binding; actin filament binding; actin binding; structural constituent of muscle; tropomyosin binding; protein binding
Cellular component	cytoplasm; Z discdkac; extracellular exosome; I band; stress fiber
Biological process	cardiac muscle thin filament assembly
Sources:Amigo / QuickGO
Orthologs
Databases	NCBI: entry; OMA: entry
Species	Human	Mouse
Entrez	10529	74103
Ensembl	ENSG00000078114	ENSMUSG00000053702
UniProt	O76041; Q5JUU7	Q9DC07; Q0II04
RefSeq (mRNA)	NM_001173484; NM_006393; NM_016365; NM_213569	NM_028757; NM_001362722
RefSeq (protein)	NP_001166955; NP_006384; NP_998734; NP_001364251; NP_001364252 NP_001364253; NP_001364254; NP_001364255; NP_001364256; NP_001364257	NP_083033.1; NP_083033; NP_001349651
Location (UCSC)	Chr 10: 20.78 – 21.17 Mb	Chr 2: 17.34 – 17.73 Mb
PubMed search
- Wikidata
View/Edit Human	View/Edit Mouse

Nebulette is a cardiac-specific isoform belonging to the nebulin family of proteins. It is encoded by the NEBL gene. This family is composed of 5 members: nebulette, nebulin, N-RAP, LASP-1 and LASP-2. Nebulette localizes to Z-discs of cardiac muscle and appears to regulate the length of actin thin filaments.

== Structure ==
Nebulette is a 116.4 kDa protein composed of 1014 amino acids. As a member of the nebulin family of proteins, nebulette is characterized by 35 amino acid stretches of ‘‘nebulin repeats’’, which are actin binding domains containing a conserved SDxxYK motif. Like nebulin, nebulette has an acidic region with unknown structure at its N-terminus, and a serine-rich region adjacent to an SH3 domain at its C-terminus. Though nebulette shares structural features with nebulin, nebulin is expressed preferentially in skeletal muscle and has an enormous size (600-900 kDa), while nebulette is expressed in cardiac muscle at Z-disc regions and is significantly smaller (roughly 1/6 of the size). Nebulette interacts with actin, tropomyosin, alpha-actinin. Xin, and XIRP2.

== Function ==
Nebulette was identified in 1995 by Moncman and Wang using primary cultures of chicken embryonic cardiomyocytes by immunoprecipitations with certain anti-nebulin monoclonal antibodies. Normal expression of nebulette is essential for the assembly and contractile function of myofibrils. Specifically, nebulette appears to regulate the stability and length of actin thin filaments, as well as beating frequencies of cardiomyocytes; reduction of full-length nebulette protein in cardiomyocytes resulted in reduced thin filament lengths, depressed beating frequencies and loss of thin filament regulatory proteins troponin I and tropomyosin.

== Clinical significance ==
Mutations in the NEBL gene have been associated with dilated cardiomyopathy. Studies in transgenic mice have supported their causative role in endocardial fibroelastosis and dilated cardiomyopathy.
