= Testin =

Protein-coding gene in humans

TES

Identifiers
- Aliases: TES, TESS, TESS-2, testin LIM domain protein
- External IDs: OMIM: 606085; MGI: 105081; GeneCards: TES
Available structures
| PDB | Ortholog search: PDBe RCSB |
| PDB | List of PDB id codes 2IYB, 2XQN |

Gene location (Human)
| Chr. | Chromosome 7 (human) |
| Band | 7q31.2 | Start | 116,210,506 bp |
| Band | 7q31.2 | End | 116,258,783 bp |

Gene location (Mouse)
| Chr. | Chromosome 6 (mouse) |
| Band | 6 A2|6 7.67 cM | Start | 17,065,148 bp |
| Band | 6 A2|6 7.67 cM | End | 17,105,827 bp |
RNA expression pattern
| Bgee | Human / Mouse (ortholog); Top expressed in: tail of epididymis; seminal vesicula; saphenous vein; gastric mucosa; superficial temporal artery; muscle layer of sigmoid colon; Descending thoracic aorta; nipple; myometrium; smooth muscle tissue / Top expressed in: retinal pigment epithelium; pyloric antrum; left colon; spermatid; seminiferous tubule; genital tubercle; granulocyte; endothelial cell of lymphatic vessel; medullary collecting duct; gastric mucosa; More reference expression data |
| BioGPS | n/a |
Gene ontology
| Molecular function | zinc ion binding; protein binding; metal ion binding; RNA binding; cadherin binding |
| Cellular component | cell junction; plasma membrane; nucleus; focal adhesion; cytoplasm; cytosol; protein-containing complex |
| Biological process | regulation of cell population proliferation; negative regulation of cell population proliferation |
Sources:Amigo / QuickGO
Orthologs
| Databases | NCBI: entry; OMA: entry |
| Species | Human | Mouse |
| Entrez | 26136 | 21753 |
| Ensembl | ENSG00000135269 | ENSMUSG00000029552 |
| UniProt | Q9UGI8 | P47226 |
| RefSeq (mRNA) | NM_015641; NM_152829 | NM_011570; NM_207176 |
| RefSeq (protein) | NP_056456; NP_690042 | n/a |
| Location (UCSC) | Chr 7: 116.21 – 116.26 Mb | Chr 6: 17.07 – 17.11 Mb |
| PubMed search |
- Wikidata
| View/Edit Human | View/Edit Mouse |

Testin (also known as TESS) is a protein that in humans is encoded by the TES gene located on chromosome 7. TES is a 47 kDa protein composed of 421 amino acids found at focal adhesions and is thought to have a role in regulation of cell motility. In addition to this, TES functions as a tumour suppressor. The TES gene is located within a fragile region of chromosome 7, and the promoter elements of the TES gene have been shown to be susceptible to methylation – this prevents the expression of the TES protein. TES came to greater prominence towards the end of 2007 as a potential mechanism for its tumour suppressor function was published.

== Domain organisation ==
Tes is composed of the following domains:

| Domain Name | Boundaries | Domain type |
|---|---|---|
| Cysteine rich domain | 1–90 | No Homology |
| PET domain | 90–200 | PET domain – no structure |
| Linker . | 201–233 | no domain |
| LIM1 | 234–300 | LIM domain |
| LIM2 | 300–365 | LIM domain |
| LIM3 | 366–421 | LIM domain |

The structures of the Cysteine rich domain and the PET domain are not known. LIM domains, however, are known as modulators of protein interactions. LIM domain consist of 2 zinc fingers separated by 2 hydrophobic amino acids (generally a phenylalanine and then a leucine).

== Binding partners ==
TES does not appear to be an enzyme; rather it is a protein that mediates/regulates cellular functions via protein–protein interactions. Pull down experiments reveal that TES has putative interactions mediated by the indicated domain:

| Partner | Domain | ref | Method |
|---|---|---|---|
| mENA/VASP | LIM3 | | Yeast two Hybrid, Pull-down assay, Structure, ITC |
| Arp7a | ??? | | Yeast two Hybrid |
| Zyxin | LIM1 | | Yeast two Hybrid, Pull-down assay |
| Actin | PET? | | Pull-down assay |
| α-Actinin | PET? | | Pull-down assay |
| Paxillin | PET? | | Pull-down assay |

Garvalov et al. showed that the interaction between TES & zyxin were direct, using recombinant proteins expressed in E. coli.

Some of the potential binding partners (Zyxin, mENA) can be found in focal adhesion complexes; the range of binding partners indicates a potential role for TES in-between 'privileged' Actin polymerisation and focal adhesion contacts to the extracellular matrix. This tallies with the observation that GFP-tagged TES can be seen at focal adhesions.

== TES as a tumour suppressor ==
In December 2007, Boeda, Briggs et al. showed that the third LIM domain of TES displaces Mena from its usual subcellular positions (focal adhesions or the cell leading edge). The ENA/VASP protein family (of which Mena is a member) are anchored to specific proteins within the cell by a peptide motif consisting of a phenylalanine residue, followed by four proline residues – known as a FPPPP motif. It is the EVH1 domains of VASP/EVL proteins that directly contact the FPPPP motif. The precise architecture of TES:MENA binding was revealed by X-ray crystallography, and showed that the 3rd LIM domain of TES covered up the FPPPP binding site within Menas EVH1 domain. Isothermal titration calorimetry showed that TES has a greater affinity for Mena than its canonical FPPPP ligand, as presented in the focal adhesion protein zyxin. Using microscopy it was shown that either over-expression of GFP-tagged TES, or just the tagged third LIM domain displaced Mena from focal adhesions and reduced mean cell velocity.

These finding were significant given that Mena is often over-expressed in cancer cells, and is thought to be partly responsible for cancer cell motility, and therefore a factor in cancer metastasis. TES is conversely often not produced in cancer cells. It is possible that a drug designed to mimic TES's interaction with Mena could be used to prevent metastasis and thus development of secondary tumours in cancer patients. The work was widely reported in the British press (the work was carried out by Cancer Research UK), and also in the international press.

== Conformational change ==
Based on the observations that:

- Mammalian cell derived TES binding Zyxin
- E. coli-produced recombinant TES (rTES) does not bind Zyxin
- An rTES construct composed of residues 201–421 (i.e., the linker and all 3 LIM domains) does bind Zyxin
- The above rTES construct binds an N-terminal rTES construct, consisting of the cysteine rich and PET domains – IE, the two-halves of TES interact with each other.

Garvalov et al. propose that TES exists in two conformational states: A 'closed' state where the N & C halves of TES interact, obscuring the Zyxin binding site in LIM1, and an 'open' state where the Zyxin binding site is accessible and the two halves no-longer interact in the same fashion, if at all. The regulatory mechanism switching between the two states is not presently fully understood.

== Phenotype ==
In RNAi experiments, cells that had impaired TES expression showed an inability to correctly organise their focal adhesions and actin stress fibres.

In gene knockout experiments, transgenic mice lacking both copies of the TES gene displayed an increased susceptibility to tumour formation when challenged with a carcinogen. Mice retaining the TES gene were less susceptible: thus, TES is a tumour suppressor gene.
