= Sporadic disease =

Occurrence of a disease with no recognisable pattern

In infectious disease epidemiology, a sporadic disease is an infectious disease which occurs only infrequently, haphazardly, irregularly, or occasionally, from time to time in a few isolated places, with no discernible temporal or spatial pattern, as opposed to a recognizable epidemic outbreak or endemic pattern. The cases are so few (single or in a cluster) and separated so widely in time and place that there exists little or no discernable connection within them. They also do not show a recognizable common source of infection. (Note: According to Fullerton et al. 2012, pp. 281–292: "...sporadic cases do not necessarily share a single specific common contaminated source...")

In the discussion of non-infectious diseases, a sporadic disease is a non-communicable disease (such as cancer) which occurs in people without any family history of that disease or without any inherited genetic predisposition for the disease (change in DNA which increases the risk of having that disease). Sporadic non-infectious diseases arise not due to any identifiable inherited gene, but because of randomly induced genetic mutations under the influence of environmental factors or of some unknown etiology. Sporadic non-infectious diseases typically occur late in life (late-onset), but early-onset sporadic non-infectious diseases also exist.

== Examples ==
=== Sporadic infectious diseases ===
Examples depend on time and place, because an infectious disease that is common in one area may be rare in another.

In the United States, tetanus, rabies, and plague are considered examples of sporadic diseases. Although the tetanus-causing bacteria Clostridium tetani is present in the soil everywhere in the United States, tetanus infections are very rare and occur in scattered locations because most individuals have either received vaccinations or clean wounds appropriately. Similarly the country records a few scattered cases of plague each year, generally contracted from rodent animals in rural areas in the western part of the country.

In another example, World Health Organization defines malaria to be sporadic when autochthonous cases (i.e. between two individuals in the same place) are too few and scattered to have any appreciable effect on the community.

=== Sporadic non-infectious diseases ===
Some examples of sporadic non-infectious diseases are sporadic Alzheimer's disease, sporadic Creutzfeldt–Jakob disease, sporadic cancers (such as sporadic basal cell carcinoma, sporadic breast cancer, sporadic medullary thyroid cancer and sporadic Kaposi's sarcoma), sporadic fatal insomnia, sporadic goitre, sporadic hemiplegic migraine, sporadic late-onset nemaline myopathy, sporadic neurofibroma and sporadic porphyria cutanea tarda.

== Potential source for an epidemic ==
If the conditions are favorable for its spread (pathogenicity, susceptibility of hosts, contact rate of individuals, population density, number of vaccinated or naturally immune individuals, etc.), a sporadic infectious disease may become the starting point of an epidemic.

For example, in developed countries, shigellosis (bacillary dysentery) is normally considered a sporadic disease, but in overcrowded places with poor sanitation and poor personal hygiene, it may become epidemic. Shigellosis was a sporadic disease in South Korea for many years, until 1998. Beginning in 1998 South Korea experienced a sudden epidemic of shigellosis among school children. Contaminated school meals were identified as the major source of infection, and after several years, the infection rate declined significantly.

In another example, the South Asian country of Bangladesh experienced sporadic cases of dengue fever, a mosquito-borne disease, from its first outbreak in 1964 until 1999. However, in 2000, the arrival of a Thai/Myanmar strain of the highly pathogenic dengue type 3 virus into the overpopulated and poorly urbanized country (which increases human-mosquito contact), with highly favorable breeding grounds (such as open water reservoirs used by poor people and accumulation of rainwater) for the vector, and very little public awareness gave rise to a sudden epidemic of dengue, with 5,551 reported cases that year. The type 3 Dengue virus subsided after 2002 and re-emerged in 2017, once again causing an outbreak in 2019.

== Difficulty of measuring ==
Molecular epidemiologist Lee Riley claims that most sporadic infections are actually part of unrecognized outbreaks, and that what appears to be endemic disease (from a traditional population-based epidemiology approach) actually consists of multiple small outbreaks (from a molecular epidemiology approach) in which seemingly unrelated (i.e., sporadic cases) are in reality epidemiologically related, because they belong to the same genotype of an infectious agent. Riley considers the differentiation of a disease occurrence as either endemic or epidemic to be not really meaningful. According to Riley, since most so-called sporadic occurrences of an endemic disease are actually small epidemics, rapid public health interventions against such occurrences can be made in the same way as they are done for recognized acute epidemics (i.e. epidemic in the traditional sense).

== Works cited ==
- Fullerton, Kathleen E.; Scallan, Elaine; Kirk, Martyn D.; Mahon, Barbara E.; Angulo, Frederick J.; de Valk, Henriette; van Pelt, Wilfrid; Gauci, Charmaine; Hauri, Anja M.; Majowicz, Shannon; O'Brien, Sarah J. (2012), "Case-Control Studies of Sporadic Enteric Infections: A Review and Discussion of Studies Conducted Internationally from 1990 to 2009", Foodborne Pathogens and Disease, 9 (4): 281–292, doi:10.1089/fpd.2011.1065, PMC 4568830, PMID 22443481
