= Zyxin =

Protein-coding gene in the species Homo sapiens

ZYX

Identifiers
- Aliases: ZYX, ESP-2, HED-2, zyxin
- External IDs: OMIM: 602002; MGI: 103072; GeneCards: ZYX

Gene location (Human)
Chr.	Chromosome 7 (human)
Band	7q34	Start	143,381,295 bp
Band	7q34	End	143,391,111 bp

Gene location (Mouse)
Chr.	Chromosome 6 (mouse)
Band	6|6 B2.1	Start	42,326,564 bp
Band	6|6 B2.1	End	42,337,147 bp
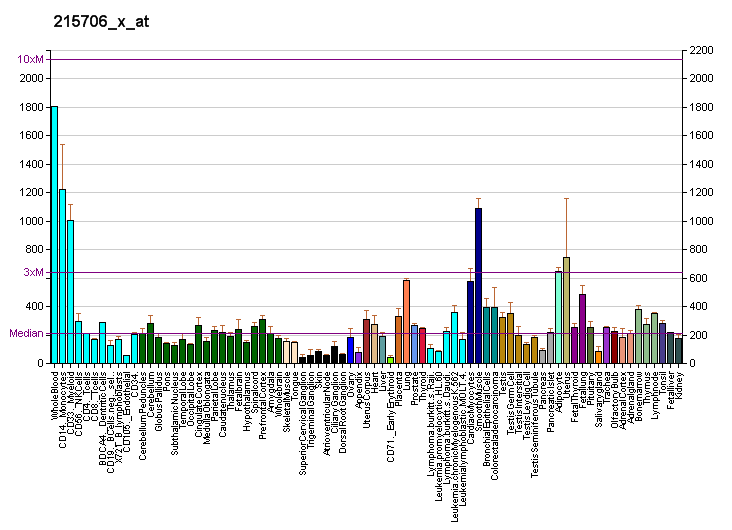

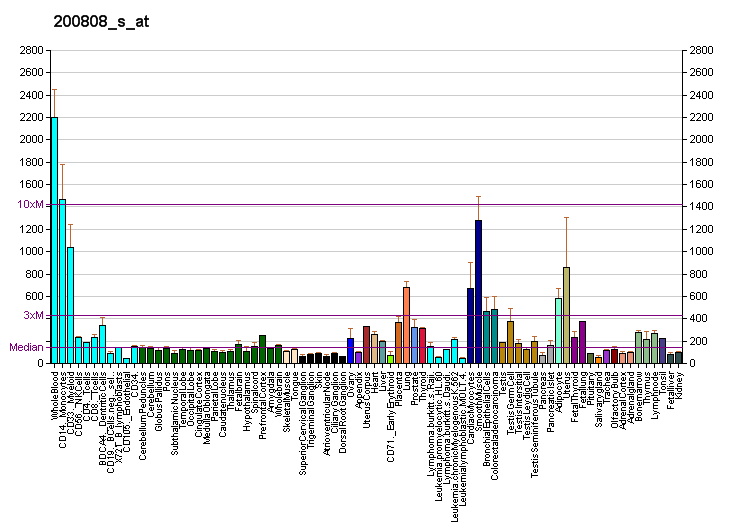
RNA expression pattern
Bgee	Human / Mouse (ortholog); Top expressed in: body of uterus; myometrium; left uterine tube; granulocyte; blood; stromal cell of endometrium; thoracic aorta; right coronary artery; ascending aorta; smooth muscle tissue / Top expressed in: granulocyte; tail of embryo; ascending aorta; tibiofemoral joint; blood; aortic valve; tunica media of zone of aorta; internal carotid artery; external carotid artery; lip; More reference expression data
BioGPS	More reference expression data
Gene ontology
Molecular function	metal ion binding; protein binding; RNA binding
Cellular component	focal adhesion; plasma membrane; integral component of plasma membrane; stress fiber; cell junction; cytoskeleton; nucleus; cytoplasm; cytosol; phagocytic vesicle
Biological process	cell-cell signaling; stress fiber assembly; cell adhesion; regulation of inflammatory response; integrin-mediated signaling pathway; cell-matrix adhesion; viral process; transforming growth factor beta receptor signaling pathway; signal transduction; cellular response to interferon-gamma
Sources:Amigo / QuickGO
Orthologs
Databases	NCBI: entry; OMA: entry
Species	Human	Mouse
Entrez	7791	22793
Ensembl	ENSG00000159840; ENSG00000285443	ENSMUSG00000029860
UniProt	Q15942	Q62523
RefSeq (mRNA)	NM_001010972; NM_003461; NM_001362783	NM_001289617; NM_001289618; NM_001289619; NM_011777
RefSeq (protein)	NP_001010972; NP_003452; NP_001349712	NP_001276546; NP_001276547; NP_001276548; NP_035907
Location (UCSC)	Chr 7: 143.38 – 143.39 Mb	Chr 6: 42.33 – 42.34 Mb
PubMed search
- Wikidata
View/Edit Human	View/Edit Mouse

Zyxin is a protein that in humans is encoded by the ZYX gene.

== Function ==
Focal adhesions are actin-rich structures that enable cells to adhere to the extracellular matrix and at which protein complexes involved in signal transduction assemble. Zyxin is a zinc-binding phosphoprotein that concentrates at focal adhesions and along the actin cytoskeleton. Zyxin has an N-terminal proline-rich domain and three LIM domains in its C-terminal half. The proline-rich domain may interact with SH3 domains of proteins involved in signal transduction pathways while the LIM domains are likely involved in protein-protein binding. Zyxin may function as a messenger in the signal transduction pathway that mediates adhesion-stimulated changes in gene expression and may modulate the cytoskeletal organization of actin bundles. Alternative splicing results in multiple transcript variants that encode the same isoform.

== Interactions ==
Zyxin has been shown to interact with:

- Actinin, alpha 1
- ENAH,
- LASP1,
- LATS1, and
- Vasodilator-stimulated phosphoprotein.
