= LIM domain–binding protein family =

Family of proteins

LIM-domain binding protein

Identifiers
- Symbol: LIM_bind
- Pfam: PF01803
- InterPro: IPR002691
- SCOP2: 1j2o / SCOPe / SUPFAM
Available protein structures:
- Pfam: structures / ECOD
- PDB: RCSB PDB; PDBe; PDBj
- PDBsum: structure summary

In molecular biology, the LIM domain-binding protein family is a family of proteins which binds to the LIM domain of LIM (LIN-11, Isl-1 and MEC-3) homeodomain proteins which are transcriptional regulators of development.

== Examples ==
Nuclear LIM interactor (NLI) / LIM domain-binding protein 1 (LDB1) is located in the nuclei of neuronal cells during development, it is co-expressed with ISL1 in early motor neuron differentiation and has a suggested role in the ISL1 dependent development of motor neurons. It is suggested that these proteins act synergistically to enhance transcriptional efficiency by acting as co-factors for LIM homeodomain and Otx class transcription factors both of which have essential roles in development. The Drosophila melanogaster protein Chip is required for segmentation and activity of a remote wing margin enhancer. Chip is a ubiquitous chromosomal factor required for normal expression of diverse genes at many stages of development. It is suggested that Chip cooperates with different LIM domain proteins and other factors to structurally support remote enhancer-promoter interactions.
