= LMOD3 =

Protein-coding gene in humans

Identifiers
- Aliases: LMOD3, NEM10, leiomodin 3
- External IDs: OMIM: 616112; MGI: 2444169; GeneCards: LMOD3

Gene location (Human)
Chr.	Chromosome 3 (human)
Band	3p14.1	Start	69,106,065 bp
Band	3p14.1	End	69,123,032 bp

Gene location (Mouse)
Chr.	Chromosome 6 (mouse)
Band	6|6 D3	Start	97,215,495 bp
Band	6|6 D3	End	97,229,720 bp
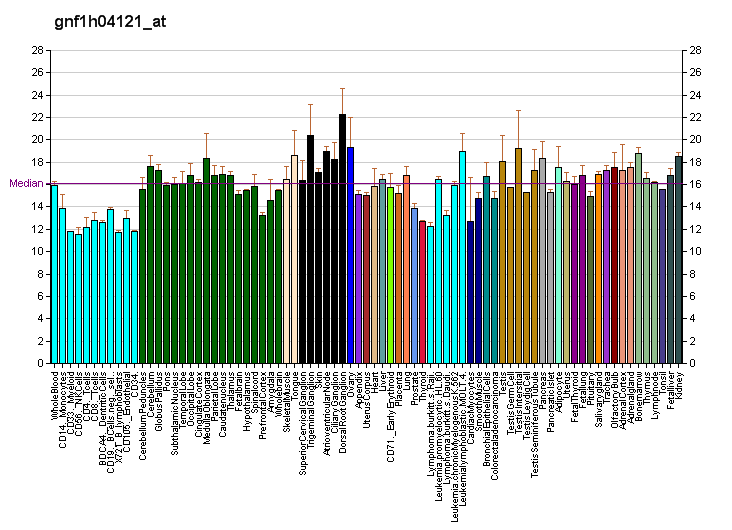

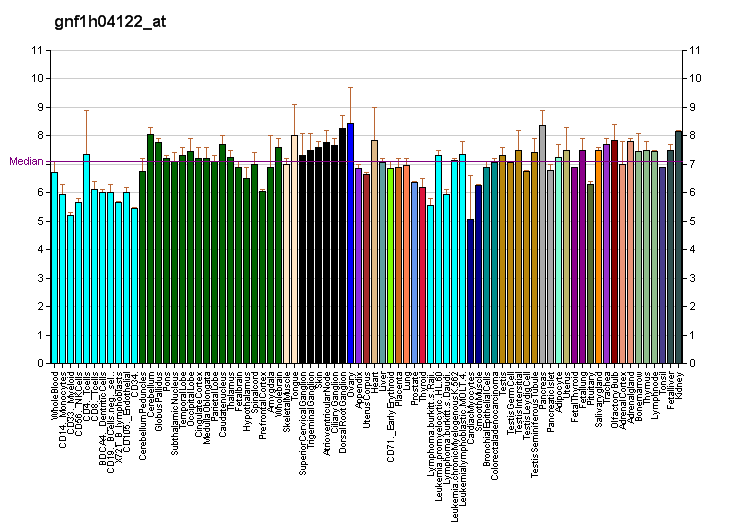
RNA expression pattern
Bgee	Human / Mouse (ortholog); Top expressed in: biceps brachii; vastus lateralis muscle; skeletal muscle tissue; Skeletal muscle tissue of rectus abdominis; Skeletal muscle tissue of biceps brachii; muscle of thigh; deltoid muscle; gastrocnemius muscle; myocardium of left ventricle; tibialis anterior muscle / Top expressed in: soleus muscle; intercostal muscle; tibialis anterior muscle; sternocleidomastoid muscle; medial head of gastrocnemius muscle; temporal muscle; quadriceps femoris muscle; ankle; digastric muscle; vastus lateralis muscle; More reference expression data
BioGPS	More reference expression data
Gene ontology
Molecular function	actin monomer binding; tropomyosin binding
Cellular component	cytoskeleton; A band; cytoplasm; striated muscle thin filament; M band; myofibril
Biological process	pointed-end actin filament capping; skeletal muscle fiber development; muscle contraction; actin filament organization; myofibril assembly; striated muscle contraction; skeletal muscle thin filament assembly; actin nucleation; positive regulation of skeletal muscle fiber development
Sources:Amigo / QuickGO
Orthologs
Databases	NCBI: entry; OMA: entry
Species	Human	Mouse
Entrez	56203	320502
Ensembl	ENSG00000163380	ENSMUSG00000044086
UniProt	Q0VAK6	E9QA62
RefSeq (mRNA)	NM_198271; NM_001304418	NM_001081157
RefSeq (protein)	NP_001291347; NP_938012	NP_001074626
Location (UCSC)	Chr 3: 69.11 – 69.12 Mb	Chr 6: 97.22 – 97.23 Mb
PubMed search
- Wikidata
View/Edit Human	View/Edit Mouse

Leiomodin-3 is a protein that in humans is encoded by the LMOD3 gene. Leiomodin-3 is especially present at the pointed end of muscle thin filaments.

== Clinical significance ==
Dysfunction is associated with thin filament disorganisation and nemaline myopathy. Kleine-Levin syndrome is also associated with LMOD3.
