= Sporadic late-onset nemaline myopathy =

Rare neuromuscular disease

- Other names: SLONM

Sporadic late-onset nemaline myopathy, or SLONM, is a very rare disease, one of the nemaline myopathies, causing loss of muscle bulk and weakness in the legs but sparing the cranial nerves, and beginning its clinical course after age 40. It was first identified in 1966 at the Mayo Clinic, by A.G. Engel, and that same year W.K. Engel and J.S. Resnick noted another case that they elaborated in 1975. The diagnosis of the disease rests on subacutely evolving weakness after age 40, normal to low CK level, a myopathic EMG with fibrillations, and often a monoclonal gammopathy. The diagnosis is confirmed by visualizing rods in cryosections on light and electron microscopy. The associated monoclonal gammopathy has an unfavorable prognosis.

== Presentation ==
Weakness in a limb-girdle distribution, hips and shoulders, after age 40 is generally the first symptom. Sometimes the weakness is predominantly distal. Head drop may also be a presenting symptom. Dysphagia may occur, as can respiratory insufficiency.

== Pathophysiology ==
The etiology is unknown. Some cases of SLONM have been comorbid with HIV infection, and others with immune disorders, and so both a viral trigger and an autoimmune disorder have been considered candidate etiologies. The monoclonal gammopathy of unknown significance (MGUS) associated with a worse prognosis also argues for an immune disorder. On electron microscopy, nemaline bodies within the affected muscle fibers may be found. These bodies are sometimes crisply rod-shaped, but can also be irregular and punctate. The rods may be found alongside atrophic muscle fibers, and may be seen arising from the thickened Z-discs of the sarcolemmae. Affected fibers may be vacuolated or lobulated.

== Diagnosis ==
The myopathic EMG demonstrates fibrillation potentials. The serum CK level will be normal or low normal. The muscle biopsy will demonstrate the nemaline rods, but as they are less than 1 μm in length they are easily overlooked. The sections must be trichromatically stained and sectioned at a thickness of 2 to 4 μm for effective visualization. Immunostains for myotilin and α-actinin all but clinch the diagnosis. However, nemaline rods may still be visible post-mortem in neurosarcoidosis, which may remain on the differential. Generally the outcome is grim, with respiratory insufficiency the cause of death.

== Treatment ==
Rehabilitation for muscle strengthening can be useful in alleviating symptoms. Improvement has been noted in two HIV-negative individuals treated with immunoglobulin (IViG) agents. Improvement has also been noted with autologous stem cell transplantation, and chemotherapy with melphalan.
