= Canada's Food Price Report =

Annual forecast of Canadian food prices

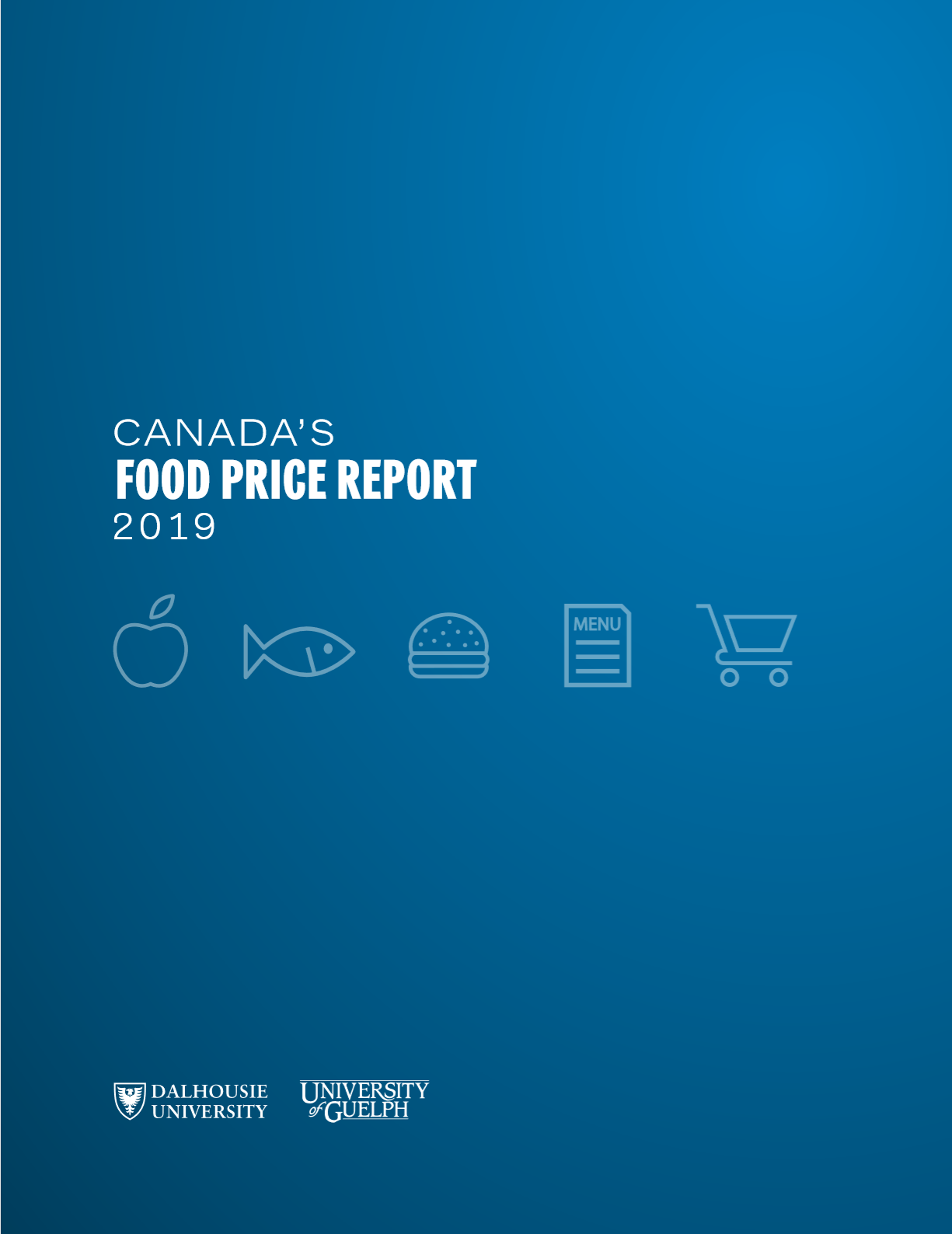
- Front page of 2019 edition
- Categories: Food, Economics
- Frequency: Annual
- First issue: December 2010
- Country: Canada
- Language: English, French

Canada's Food Price Report provides a forecast of Canadian food prices and trends for the coming year. The report is available in English and French, and has been published annually in December since 2010.

Canada's Food Price Report aims to help consumers understand their grocery bills by explaining the factors that affect food prices such as energy costs, geopolitical conflicts, and currency fluctuations. It is a resource to help consumers, businesses, and policymakers make more informed decisions.

The University of Guelph produced the report until 2016, when it was joined by Dalhousie University. Since 2020, the University of Saskatchewan and the University of British Columbia have also contributed to the project team. The researchers use historical data sources, machine learning algorithms, and predictive analytics tools to forecast food prices.

Canada's Food Price Report is regularly cited in the Canadian media, including CBC News, CTV News, Global News, The Globe and Mail, and Radio Canada. In 2015, the report was recognized as one of the University of Guelph's most significant research accomplishments over the past 50 years.

An August 2024 paper in Canadian Food Studies found that the Report were "scientifically incomplete" since it did not adequately account for climate change and the impact of corporate decisions on price.

== 2018 ==
The report published in December 2017 projected an increase in food prices in 2018 between 1% and 3% which was lower than the 2016 forecast for 2017. This would represent an increase of $348 in 2018 compared to 2017. It was the first year that the researchers reported on the "major discounting and disruption" caused by the Walmart, Costco and Amazon in the food landscape in Canada. CBC News reported that the biggest increases in the price of vegetables and restaurant food, which were forecast to increase between 4% and 6%. This was a larger increase than the usual 1% to 3% "normally experienced by restaurants".

== 2019 ==
The Globe and Mail reported the predictions for 2019, with food prices expected to rise between 1.5% to 3.5% in 2019, which would represent an increase in the cost of food of $411 for a family of four compared to 2018. The biggest increase would be in vegetables—between 4% and 6%.

== 2020 ==
ICI Radio Canada cited the report saying that the projected increase in the price of food for 2020 represented a greater increase than the rate of inflation.

== 2021 ==
Articles by CTV News and CBC were published on the day the report for 2021 was released, 8 December 2020. Factors that contributed to increases in the price of food in Canada included the "pandemic, wildfires and changing consumer habits". The predicted overall food price increase of between 3% and 5% in 2021 was the highest "ever predicted by an annual food price report". It meant that an average family in Canada would pay $695 more for food in 2021 than in 2020.

== 2022 ==
The 12th edition of Canada's Food Price Report 2022 included research by four universities, Dalhousie University, the University of Guelph, the University of Saskatchewan and the University of British Columbia. Predictions include an increase in total food prices between 5% and 7% with the highest increases in dairy products and vegetables. This would result in a family of four seeing an increase of almost $1000 in their annual cost of food. This represents the highest increase since 2010. In 2021, there were a number of factors that contributed to an increase in the cost of food including problems with the food supply chain, including reduced capacity in maritime transport, high costs of transportation, COVID-19 pandemic ongoing disruptions and related lockdowns, wildfires and drought, and a high rate of general inflation that rose to levels of the early 2000s.

Researchers noted that the provinces that will experience higher prices in 2022 are Alberta, British Columbia, Newfoundland and Labrador, Ontario, and Saskatchewan. Challenges with the food supply chain include disruptive closures, sanitation, transportation costs and reduced capacity. In previous publications of the Food Price Report, predictions of overall increases have been accurate in ten of the eleven years.
