= Myocardial disarray =

Myocardial disarray, also known as myocyte disarray, is a term to describe the loss of the normal parallel alignment of myocytes (the muscle cells of the heart). Instead, the myocytes usually form circles around foci of connective tissue. Myocardial disarray is associated with myocardial fibrosis (the replacement of the myocytes with non-contractile scar tissue).

Myocardial disarray can be seen in a number of disease states, including:

- Aortic stenosis
- Congenital heart disease
- Hypertensive heart disease
- Hypertrophic cardiomyopathy

The common factor amongst all these diseases is that they all cause varying degrees of remodelling (myocardial fibrosis) of the ventricles.
