= Canada's Food Guide =

Diet planning document produced by Health Canada

Canada's Food Guide, from Health Canada (released January 2019)

Canada's Food Guide (French: Guide alimentaire canadien) is a nutrition guide produced by Health Canada. In 2007, it was reported to be the second most requested Canadian government publication, behind the Income Tax Forms. The Health Canada website states: "Food guides are basic education tools that are designed to help people follow a healthy diet."

== History ==
=== Inception ===
Canada's first food guide was introduced in 1942 to provide guidance to Canadians on proper nutrition during a period of time when wartime rations were common. The 1942 version was called the Official Food Rules. The guide identified six food groups: Milk; Fruit; Vegetables; Cereals and Breads; Meat, Fish, etc.; and Eggs.

=== 1944 ===
In 1944 the guide was revised and renamed Canada's Food Rules. The Meat and Fish group was expanded to include cheese and eggs, and a recommendation was added to use iodized salt.

=== 1949 ===
In 1949, the Guide was amended based on the feedback from teachers, who had been using this as a resource in primary school. The five food groups were kept; the reference to butter, which had been incorporated into the section on Breads and Cereals in 1944, grew to include "or fortified margarine", an engineered spread which was by that date manufactured from vegetable oils due to wartime shortages of tallow and lard. Vitamin D supplements, available from sources such as cod liver oil, were recommended for the first time.

=== 1961 ===
In 1961, the guidelines were revised and renamed to Canada's Food Guide, instead of "Rules". The emphasis on whole grain remained. Milk needs of expectant and nursing mothers were underlined, and citrus fruit made its debut because it was available in stores for the first time as developments in highways and trucks allowed for their transport from Florida to the Canadian market.

=== 1977 ===
The change from five to four food groups was seen in the 1977 Guide when "fruits and vegetables" became a single group. Daily potatoes were no longer recommended. The metric system was employed for the first time. The Canada's Food Guide Handbook made its first appearance.

=== 1982 ===
The 1982 version of the Guide issued a warning to Canadians about the relationship of diet and heart disease, as the Report of the Committee on Diet and Cardiovascular Disease made its impact:

After reviewing the information available on the relationship between diet and cardiovascular disease, [the committee] believes that there is an adequate basis for recommending changes in the Canadian diet.

=== 1992 ===
In 1992, the name evolved to Canada's Food Guide to Healthy Eating. A "rainbow graphic" replaced the circular pie-chart graphic that had been favoured since 1977. The four groups were renamed: Meat and Alternatives, Grain Products, Vegetables and Fruit, and Milk Products. A fifth group of "Other Foods" made its appearance overleaf. A change in philosophy was noted too: whereas previous food guides had been based on a "foundation diet", whereby diet was identified with "minimum requirements" and those persons with "higher needs" were instructed to consume more food, the 1992 guide identified a "total diet" approach, under which the range of "different ages, body sizes, activity levels, genders and conditions such as pregnancy and nursing" theoretically were accommodated, and with the caveat "that energy needs vary". The consumer was subtly prodded to increase their consumption of grain products while they minimised their consumption of meat products, through the suggestive "rainbow" that was in reality an areal subterfuge. The consultative process to develop the 1992 guide was novel to bureaucrats who formerly had used a hierarchical approach: "information was assembled from experts, consumers, literature reviews, food consumption surveys, consumer research, and commissioned scientific reviews". A 16-page booklet was developed in addition to the recto-verso poster that had been issued in former years. A food guide in both official languages was produced and for the first time made available via the internet. A "Food Guide Facts - Background for Educators and Communicators" booklet was intended to help teachers plan their classes.

=== 2007 ===
The year 2007 saw for the first time an ethnoculturally specific Guide: the Food Guide for First Nations, Inuit and Métis people was introduced. The name of the main guide evolved to Eating Well with Canada's Food Guide. The guide expanded to six pages in a fold-out pamphlet, with new content addressing the multicultural population of Canada. Obesity was recognized as a dietary problem. The Milk Products group became known as the Milk and Alternatives group, as "fortified soy beverage" was officially introduced to accommodate "non-milk drinkers". A guidance to reduce consumption of trans fats and replace saturated fats with unsaturated fats was identified. Instead of the cod-liver oil of days gone by, Canadians over 50 years of age were now invited to consume vitamin D dietary supplements. The choice of healthy foods was linked to the food label. Nine age and sex groups were identified for specific recommendations. "Three Advisory Groups provided guidance and advice throughout the revision process – the DRI Expert Advisory Committee, an Interdepartmental Working Group and the Food Guide Advisory Committee". An "extensive consultation with a range of stakeholders regarding the 1992 Food Guide" was duly noted. The Dietary Reference Intake (DRI) tool from the American Institute of Medicine was introduced to the Canadian taxpayer.

=== 2019 ===
Canada's Food Guide was updated and released to the general public in January 2019. Unlike previous food guides' emphasis on food groups and recommended servings, the 2019 revision from Health Canada recommends eating "plenty of vegetables and fruits, whole grain foods and protein foods. Choose protein foods that come from plants more often." The guide was prepared using scientific reports on food and health, excluding industry-commissioned reports given the potential for conflicts of interest, according to Health Canada.

=== Historical gallery ===
Canada's Food Guide: A Pictorial History

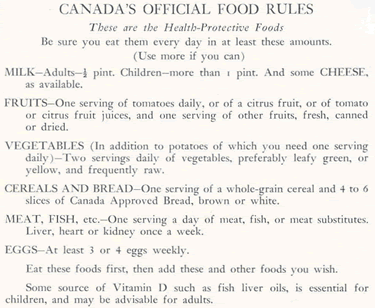
1942

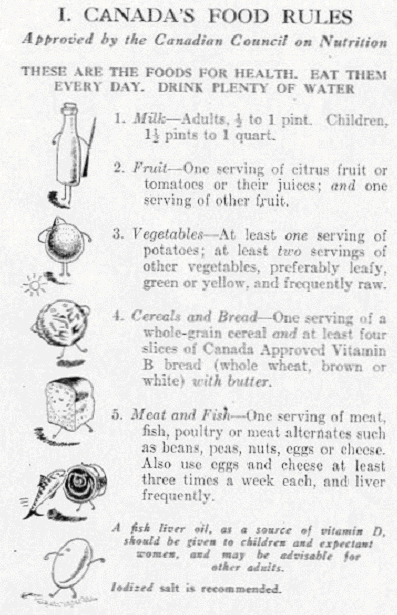
1944

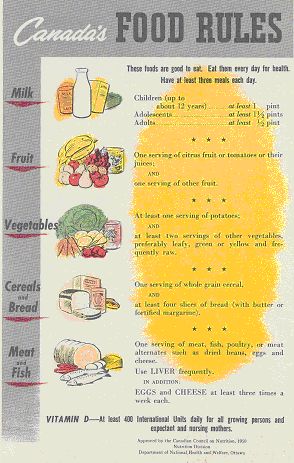
1949

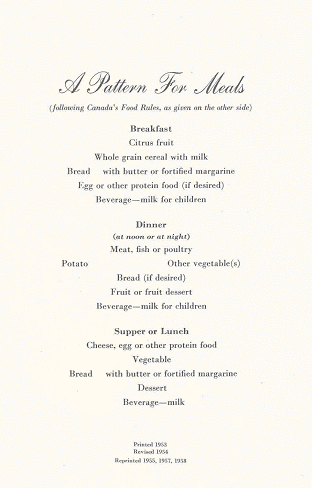
1949

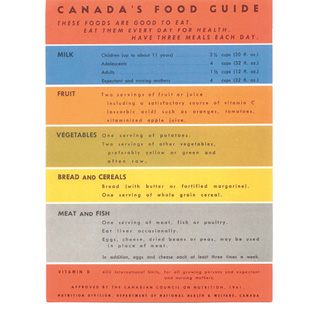
1961

== Food Guide, 2019 edition ==
=== Food ===
The Guide recommends eating a variety of healthy foods each day including plenty of vegetables and fruits, protein foods, and whole grain foods. It recommends choosing protein foods that come from plants more often. It also recommends limiting highly processed foods.

=== Beverages ===
The Guide recommends making water one's drink of choice. It is a calorie-free, fat-free, sugar-free thirst quencher that is essential to the body's metabolic functions. Consumption of water should increase with temperature or an individual's physical activity. The Guide also recommends avoiding beverages with added sugar or fat. Caffeinated beverages, fruit juices, and energy drinks should only be consumed in moderation.

=== Healthy behaviours and habits ===
The Guide also recommends the following behaviours related to food:

- Be mindful of eating habits
- Cook more often
- Enjoy food
- Eat meals with others
- Use food labels
- Be aware of food marketing
- Limit foods high in sodium, sugars or saturated fat
- Involve others in planning and preparing meals
- Notice when you are hungry and when you are full

=== Serving size vs. proportion ===
In the past, Canada's Food Guide outlined how much of each specific food is equal to one serving and recommended eating a specific number of serving sizes across each of the four food groups. In 2019, this approach was updated to show a proportional plate. Instead of specific servings, the plate shows 50% of calories coming from vegetables and fruits, 25% of calories from whole grain foods, and 25% of calories from protein foods.
