= LASP1 =

Protein-coding gene in the species Homo sapiens

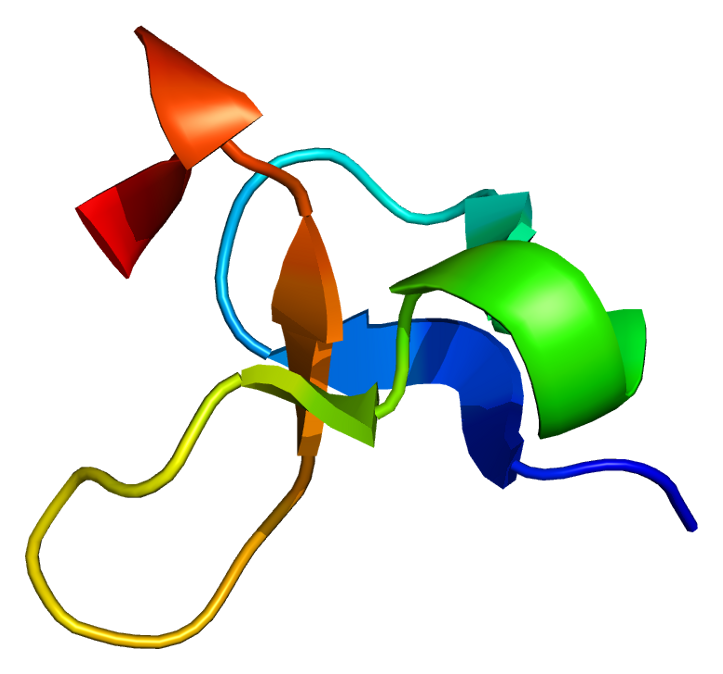

Identifiers
- Aliases: LASP1, MLN50, LIM and SH3 protein 1, LASP-1
- External IDs: OMIM: 602920; MGI: 109656; GeneCards: LASP1
Available structures
PDB	Ortholog search: PDBe RCSB
PDB	List of PDB id codes 3I35

Gene location (Human)
Chr.	Chromosome 17 (human)
Band	17q12	Start	38,869,859 bp
Band	17q12	End	38,921,770 bp

Gene location (Mouse)
Chr.	Chromosome 11 (mouse)
Band	11 D|11 61.1 cM	Start	97,689,826 bp
Band	11 D|11 61.1 cM	End	97,729,590 bp
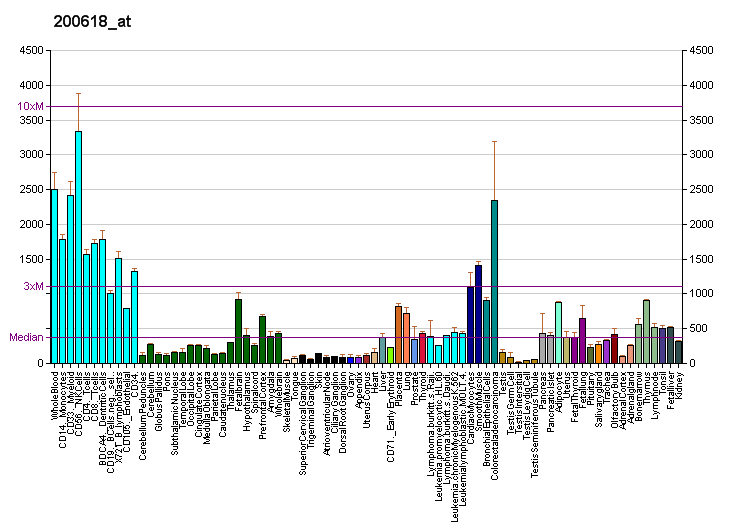
RNA expression pattern
Bgee	Human / Mouse (ortholog); Top expressed in: lower lobe of lung; jejunal mucosa; mucosa of ileum; lactiferous duct; duodenum; stromal cell of endometrium; superficial temporal artery; trabecular bone; mucosa of paranasal sinus; thymus / Top expressed in: retinal pigment epithelium; conjunctival fornix; external carotid artery; ciliary body; internal carotid artery; epithelium of stomach; otic placode; saccule; Rostral migratory stream; migratory enteric neural crest cell; More reference expression data
BioGPS	More reference expression data
Gene ontology
Molecular function	ion transmembrane transporter activity; actin filament binding; actin binding; protein binding; metal ion binding; cadherin binding
Cellular component	cell cortex; extracellular exosome; cytoskeleton; focal adhesion; cortical actin cytoskeleton; cytoplasm
Biological process	ion transmembrane transport; ion transport; positive regulation of signal transduction; transport
Sources:Amigo / QuickGO
Orthologs
Databases	NCBI: entry; OMA: entry
Species	Human	Mouse
Entrez	3927	16796
Ensembl	ENSG00000002834	ENSMUSG00000038366
UniProt	Q14847	Q61792
RefSeq (mRNA)	NM_001271608; NM_006148	NM_010688
RefSeq (protein)	NP_001258537; NP_006139	NP_034818
Location (UCSC)	Chr 17: 38.87 – 38.92 Mb	Chr 11: 97.69 – 97.73 Mb
PubMed search
- Wikidata
View/Edit Human	View/Edit Mouse

LIM and SH3 domain protein 1 is a protein that in humans is encoded by the LASP1 gene.

This gene encodes a member of a LIM protein subfamily which is characterized by a LIM motif and a domain of Src homology region 3. This protein functions as an actin-binding protein and possibly in cytoskeletal organization.

== Interactions ==
LASP1 has been shown to interact with Zyxin.
