= Nebulin =

Protein-coding gene in the species Homo sapiens

NEB
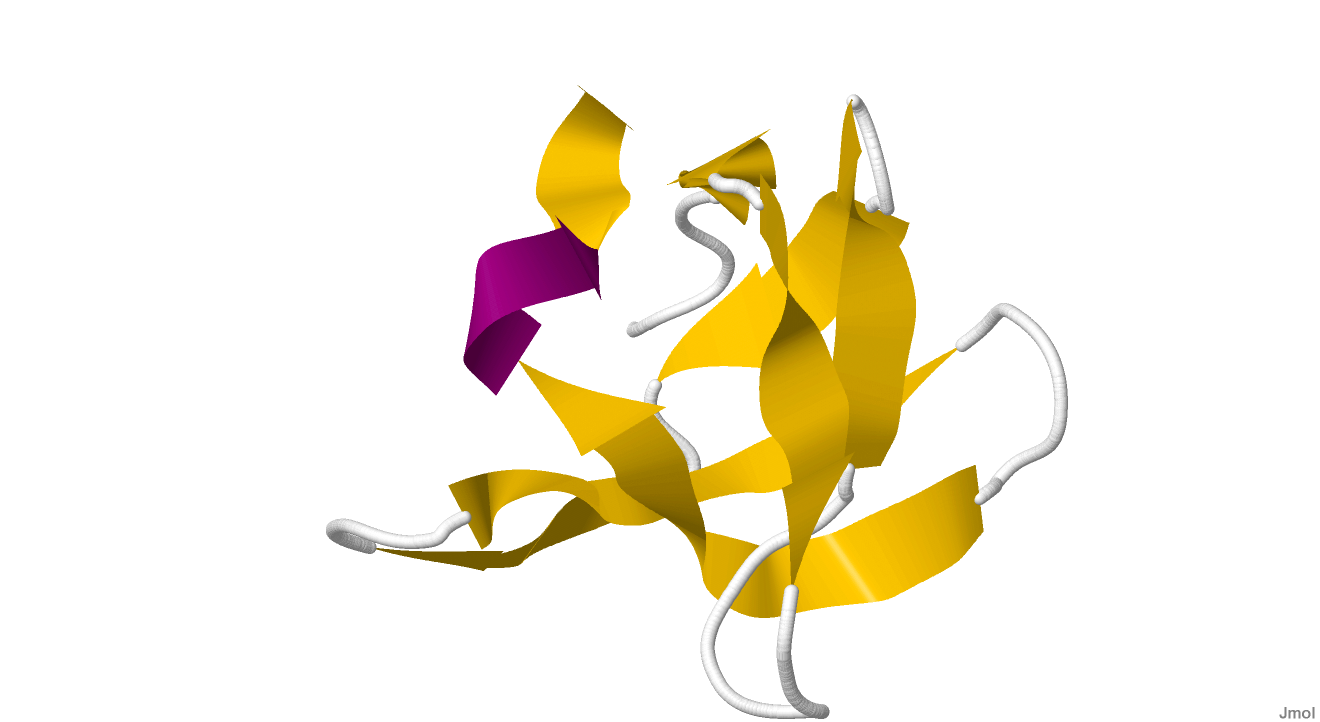

Identifiers
- Aliases: NEB, nebulin, NEB177D, NEM2, AMC6
- External IDs: OMIM: 161650; MGI: 97292; GeneCards: NEB
Available structures
| PDB | Human UniProt search: PDBe RCSB |
| PDB | List of PDB id codes 1NEB, 1ARK |

Gene location (Human)
| Chr. | Chromosome 2 (human) |
| Band | 2q23.3 | Start | 151,485,336 bp |
| Band | 2q23.3 | End | 151,734,487 bp |

Gene location (Mouse)
| Chr. | Chromosome 2 (mouse) |
| Band | 2 C1.1|2 29.98 cM | Start | 52,136,647 bp |
| Band | 2 C1.1|2 29.98 cM | End | 52,378,474 bp |
RNA expression pattern
| Bgee | Human / Mouse (ortholog); Top expressed in: glutes; biceps brachii; Skeletal muscle tissue of biceps brachii; tibialis anterior muscle; Skeletal muscle tissue of rectus abdominis; gastrocnemius muscle; deltoid muscle; triceps brachii muscle; quadriceps femoris muscle; vastus lateralis muscle / Top expressed in: muscle of thigh; knee joint; quadriceps femoris muscle; soleus muscle; triceps brachii muscle; medial head of gastrocnemius muscle; tibialis anterior muscle; vastus lateralis muscle; skeletal muscle tissue; temporal muscle; More reference expression data |
| BioGPS | n/a |
Gene ontology
| Molecular function | actin binding; structural constituent of muscle; protein binding; actin filament binding |
| Cellular component | cytoplasm; cytosol; sarcomere; Z discdkac; extracellular exosome; cytoskeleton; actin cytoskeleton |
| Biological process | muscle filament sliding; muscle organ development; somatic muscle development; regulation of actin filament length; cardiac muscle thin filament assembly |
Sources:Amigo / QuickGO
Orthologs
| Databases | NCBI: entry; OMA: entry |
| Species | Human | Mouse |
| Entrez | 4703 | 17996 |
| Ensembl | ENSG00000183091 | ENSMUSG00000026950 |
| UniProt | P20929; Q05C45 | n/a |
| RefSeq (mRNA) | NM_001164507; NM_001164508; NM_001271208; NM_004543 | NM_010889 |
| RefSeq (protein) | NP_001157979; NP_001157980; NP_001258137; NP_004534; NP_004534.2 | n/a |
| Location (UCSC) | Chr 2: 151.49 – 151.73 Mb | Chr 2: 52.14 – 52.38 Mb |
| PubMed search |
- Wikidata
| View/Edit Human | View/Edit Mouse |

Nebulin is an actin-binding protein which is localized to the thin filament of the sarcomeres in skeletal muscle. Nebulin in humans is coded for by the gene NEB. It is a very large protein (600–900 kDa) and binds as many as 200 actin monomers. Because its length is proportional to thin filament length, it is believed that nebulin acts as a thin filament "ruler" and regulates thin filament length during sarcomere assembly. Other functions of nebulin, such as a role in cell signaling, remain uncertain.

Nebulin has also been shown to regulate actin-myosin interactions by inhibiting ATPase activity in a calcium-calmodulin sensitive manner.

Mutations in nebulin cause some cases of the autosomal recessive disorder nemaline myopathy.

A smaller member of the nebulin protein family, termed nebulette, is expressed in cardiac muscle.

== Structure ==
The structure of the SH3 domain of nebulin was determined by protein nuclear magnetic resonance spectroscopy. The SH3 domain from nebulin is composed of 60 amino acid residues, of which 30 percent is in the beta sheet secondary structure (7 strands; 18 residues).

== Knockout phenotype ==
As of 2007, two knockout mouse models for nebulin have been developed to better understand its in vivo function. Bang and colleagues demonstrated that nebulin-knockout mice die postnatally, have reduced thin filament length, and impaired contractile function. Postnatal sarcomere disorganization and degeneration occurred rapidly in these mice, indicating the nebulin is essential for maintaining the structural integrity of myofibrils. Witt and colleagues had similar results in their mice, which also died postnatally with reduced thin filament length and contractile function. These nebulin-knockout mice are being investigated as animal models of nemaline myopathy.
