= LIM domain =

InterPro Domain

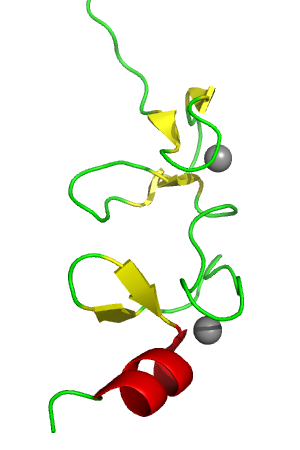
- Structure of the 4th LIM domain of Pinch protein. Zinc atoms are shown in grey

Identifiers
- Symbol: LIM
- Pfam: PF00412
- InterPro: IPR001781
- PROSITE: PDOC50178
- SCOP2: 1ctl / SCOPe / SUPFAM
- CDD: cd08368
Available protein structures:
- PDB: 1ctlA:11–67 IPR001781 PF00412 (ECOD; PDBsum)
- AlphaFold: IPR001781; PF00412

LIM domains are protein structural domains, composed of two contiguous zinc fingers, separated by a two-amino acid residue hydrophobic linker. The domain name is an acronym of the three genes in which it was first identified (LIN-11, Isl-1 and MEC-3). LIM is a protein interaction domain that is involved in binding to many structurally and functionally diverse partners. The LIM domain appeared in eukaryotes sometime prior to the most recent common ancestor of plants, fungi, amoeba and animals. In animal cells, LIM domain-containing proteins often shuttle between the cell nucleus where they can regulate gene expression, and the cytoplasm where they are usually associated with actin cytoskeletal structures involved in connecting cells together and to the surrounding matrix, such as stress fibers, focal adhesions and adherens junctions.

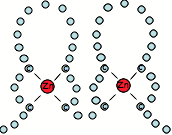
LIM domain organization

== Discovery ==
LIM domains are named after their initial discovery in the three homeobox proteins that have the following functions:

- Lin-11 – asymmetric division of vulvar blast cells
- Isl-1 – motor neuron development of neuroepithelial cells
- Mec-3 – differentiation of touch receptor neurons

== Sequence and Structure ==
Humans contain 73 described genes encoding different LIM domain-containing proteins. These LIM domains have divergent amino acid sequences apart from certain key residues involved in zinc binding, which facilitate the formation of a stable protein core and tertiary fold. The sequence variation between different LIM domains may be due to the evolution of novel binding sites for diverse partners on top of the conserved stable core. Additionally, LIM domain proteins are functionally diverse; especially during the early evolution of animals, the LIM domain recombined with a variety of other domain types to create these diverse proteins with new functionality.

The sequence signature of LIM domains is as follows:

[C]-[X]_{2–4}-[C]-[X]_{13–19}-[W]-[H]-[X]_{2–4}-[C]-[F]-[LVI]-[C]-[X]_{2–4}-[C]-[X]_{13–20}-C-[X]_{2–4}-[C]

LIM domains frequently occur in multiples, as seen in proteins such as TES, LMO4, and can also be attached to other domains in order to confer a binding or targeting function upon them, such as LIM-kinase.

== Roles ==
LIM-domain containing proteins have been shown to play roles in cytoskeletal organization, organ development, regulation of plant cell development, cell lineage specification, and regulation of gene transcription. LIM proteins are also implicated in a variety of heart and muscle conditions, oncogenesis, neurological disorders and other diseases. LIM-domains mediate a variety of protein–protein interactions in many different cellular processes. However a large subset of LIM proteins are recruited to actin cytoskeletal structures that are under a mechanical load. Direct force-activated F-actin binding by LIM recruits LIM domain proteins to stressed cytoskeletal networks and is an example of a mechanosensing mechanism by which cytoskeletal tension governs mechanical homeostasis, nuclear localization, gene expression, and other cellular physiology.

== Classification ==
The LIM superclass of genes have been classified into 14 classes: ABLIM, CRP, ENIGMA, EPLIN, LASP, LHX, LMO, LIMK, LMO7, MICAL, PXN, PINCH, TES, and ZYX. Six of these classes (i.e., ABLIM, MICAL, ENIGMA, ZYX, LHX, LM07) originated in the stem lineage of animals, and this expansion is thought to have made a major contribution to the origin of animal multicellularity.

Asides lineage of animals, there are an entire class of plant LIM genes that were classified into four different classes: WLIM1, WLIM2, PLIM1, PLIM2, and FLIM (XLIM). These are sorted into 4 different subfamilies: αLIM1, βLIM1, γLIM2, and δLIM2. The αLIM1 subclades include PLIM1, WLIM1, and FLIM (XLIM). βLIM1 is a new subfamily, so no current distinguishable subclades. γLIM2 subclades contain WLIM2 and PLIM2. The final subfamily δLIM2 contains WLIM2, and PLIM2.

LIM domains are also found in various bacterial lineages where they are typically fused to a metallopeptidase domain. Some versions show fusions to an inactive P-loop NTPase at their N-terminus and a single transmembrane helix. These domain fusions suggest that the prokaryotic LIM domains are likely to regulate protein processing at the cell membrane. The domain architectural syntax is remarkably parallel to those of the prokaryotic versions of the B-box zinc finger and the AN1 zinc finger domains.

LIM domain containing proteins serve many specific functions in cells such as adherens junction, cytoarchitecture, specification of cell polarity, nuclear-cytoplasmic shuttling, and protein trafficking. These domains can be found in eukaryotes, plants, animal, fungi, and mycetozoa. It was classified as A, B, C, and D. These classifications are further sorted into three groups.

=== Group 1 ===
This group contains LIM domain classes A and B. They are typically fused to other functional domains such as kinases. The subclasses for these domains are LIM-homeodomain transcription factors, LMO proteins, and LIM kinases.

==== LIM-homeodomain transcription factors ====
They have multifunctionality primarily focusing on development of the nervous system, activation of transcription, and cell fate specification during development. The nervous system relies on the LIM domain type for differentiation of neurotransmitter biosynthetic pathways.

==== LMO proteins ====
These proteins focus on overall development of multiple cell types as well as oncogenesis and transcriptional regulation. Oncogenesis was found to occur due to the expression of LMO 1 and LMO 2 in T-cell leukemia patients.

==== LIM kinases ====
The purpose of these proteins is the establishment and regulation of the cytoskeleton. The regulation of the cytoskeleton by these kinases is through phosphorylation of cofilin, which allows for the accumulation of actin filaments. Notably, they have been found to be responsible for regulation of cell motility and morphogenesis.

=== Group 2 ===
This group contains LIM domain class C, which are localized typically in the cytoplasm. These domains are internally duplicated with two copies per a protein. Also, they are more similar to each than classes A and B.

==== Cysteine-rich proteins ====
There are three different cysteine rich proteins. The purpose of these proteins is their role in myogenesis and muscle structure. Although, it was found that structural role is played in multiple types of cells. Each of the CRP proteins are activated throughout myogenesis. CRP 3 plays a role in development of myoblasts, while CRP 1 is active in fibro blast cells. CRP 1 has more roles involved with actin filaments and z lines of myofibers.

=== Group 3 ===
This group contains only class D, which are typically localized in the cytoplasm. These LIM proteins contain 1 to 5 domains. These domains can have additional functional domains or motifs. This group is limited to three different adaptor proteins: zyxin, paxillin, and PINCH. They each respectively have different number of LIM domains with 3, 4, and 5. These are considered adaptor proteins related to adhesion plaques that regulate cell shape and spreading through distinct LIM-mediated protein-protein interactions.

== Protein-protein interactions ==
=== LIM-HD & LMO ===
These proteins are formed through interaction of LIM domain binding families that are bound by LIM1. LIM-Ldb interacts to form different heterodimers of LIM-HD. THis will typically form a LIM-LID region that interacts with LIM proteins. LIM-HD is known to determine distinct identities for motor neurons during development. It has been found to bind LMO1, LMO2, Lhx1, Isl1, and Mec3. LMO2 is found to be localized in the nucleus, which is involved in erythroid development especially in the fetal liver.

=== Zyxin ===
This protein is localized between the cytoplasm and nucleus through shuttling. It focuses on moving between cell adhesion sites and nucleus. The zinc fingers of the LIM domain will act independently. Zyxin has a variety of bind partners such as CRP, α-actinin, proto-oncogene Vav, p130, and members of Ena/VASP family of proteins. The known interactions of zyxin are between Ena/VASP and CRP1. LIM1 is responsible for recognition of CRP1, but cooperate with LIM2 for binding to zyxin. The Ena/VASP will bind profilin that is known to act as a actin-polymerizing protein. The zyxin-VASP complex will initiate actin-polymerization for the cytoskeletal structure.

=== Paxillin ===
This protein is localized in the cytoplasm at focal adhesion sites. It functions as a central protein for fatty acids and development of cystoskeletal structure. In fatty acids, they act as scaffolds for many binding partners. The LIM domain at the c-terminal bind protein tyrosine phosphatase-PEST. PTP-PEST binds at c-termini LIM 3 and 4 to disassemble fatty acids that will lead to the modulation of the fatty acid targeting regions. The extent of binding will depend on LIM 2 and 4. This will occur upon dephosphorylation of p130 and paxillin.

=== ENIGMA ===
This protein is localized in the cytoplasm, which serves in signaling and protein trafficking. The structure of this protein contains three LIM domains at the c-terminal. It will bind insulin receptor internalization motif (InsRF) at LIM domain 3. LIM domain 2 binds Ret receptor tyrosine kinase.

=== PINCH ===
This protein is localized in the cytoplasm and nucleus. It is responsible for effecting specific muscle adherens junctions and mechanosensory functions of touch receptor neurons. The protein sequence in the LIM domains are linked with very short interdomain peptides and c-terminal extension with high amounts of positive charges. The protein has multiple functions even presenting in senescent erythrocyte antigens. It can bind to ankyrin repeat domains of integrin-linked kinase. Also, LIM domain 4 of PINCH can bind to Nck2 protein to act as a adaptor.
