= Myomesin =

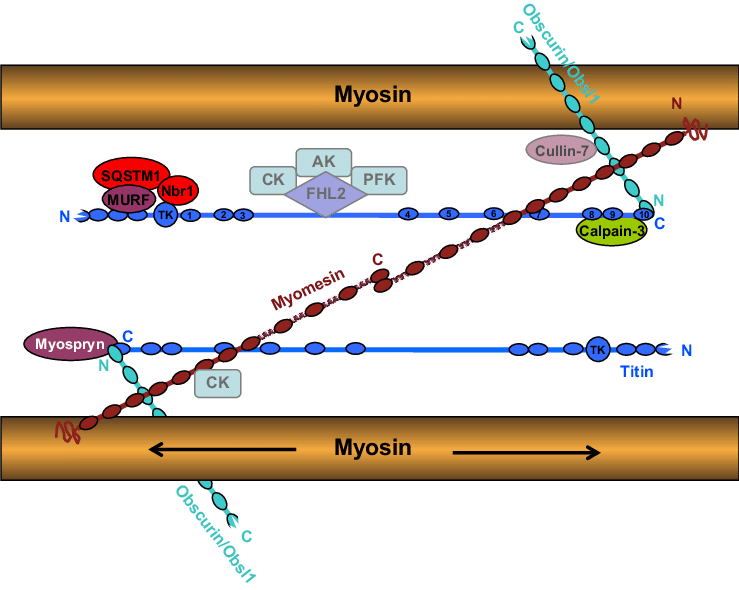
Detailed representation of the M-band region of the sarcomere. Myomesin is bound to myosin at its N-terminal. Obscurin connects the myomesin dimers and binds to the C-terminal of titin. It is thought that the myomesin-titin interaction is vital for the execution of the mechanical functions of the Ser/Thr kinase domain of titin.

Myomesin is a protein family found in the M-line of the sarcomere structure. Myomesin has various forms throughout the body in striated muscles with specialized functions. This includes both slow and fast muscle fibers. Myomesin are made of 13 domains including a unique N-terminal followed by two immunoglobulin-like (Ig) domains, five fibronectin type III (Fn) domains, five more Ig domains. These domains all promote binding which indicates that myomesin is regulated through binding.

== Functions ==
=== Sarcomere structure ===
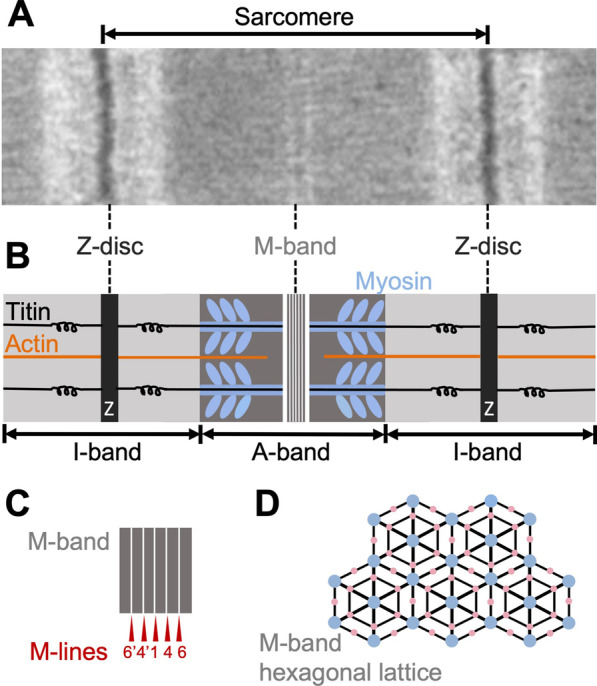
Sarcomere and M-band structure. (a) electron micrograph of mouse heart muscle sarcomere. (b) diagram of sarcomere layout from (a). Myosin thick filaments are blue, thin actin filaments are orange, Z-discs are black, and the M-band is grey/white. (c) schematic of M-band composition of M-lines. (d) M-band hexagonal lattice based on electron microscopy sections. Blue circles represent myosin, pink circles represent linking filaments, and black lines are the positions of the linking material.

Myomesin plays an important role in the structure of sarcomeres. They are found in the M-band region of the sarcomere, between the thick filaments (myosin). Its main purpose in this setting is to provide structural integrity by linking the antiparallel myosin fibers and titin filaments which are connected to the Z-discs. These myosin filaments form a hexagonal lattice with titin and myomesin. This shape allows the M-band to withstand large conformational changes during muscle contraction and return to their original shape upon relaxation. Since the Z-disc region of the sarcomere is very stiff and unable to bend for contraction, the elastic activity of myomesin in the M-band is what makes muscle contraction possible as it acts as a molecular spring.

=== Sarcomere assembly ===
In addition to sarcomere activity, it has been shown that myomesin also plays a role in the assembly of the sarcomere. In order for myomesin to be implemented into the sarcomere, myosin and titin must be present, indicating that myomesin is the last component to be added during assembly of the lattice. It is believed that this postponed addition is due to the role of myomesin to act as an "integrity check" to ensure the sarcomere has been formed correctly and monitor its integrity. This is extremely important as if even one piece of the M-line is missing, the A-band of the sarcomere will collapse and the muscle will be paralyzed.

=== Response to injury ===
Myomesin has also been shown to play a role in injury response and expression. It was previously thought that myosin chaperones were the first alert of sarcomere damage, but recent studies show a flux of expression the gene myomesin1a much earlier than that of the myosin, suggesting that there is a myomesin-dependent injury response pathway in striated muscles. Additionally, it is thought that this gene could be used as an enhanced biomarker for sarcomere damage compared to the current biomarker, muscle creatine kinase (CKM). When tested in vivo in zebrafish, myom1a expression was displayed much earlier than creatine kinase, indicating that the latter is less specific to muscle diseases. This supports the use of myomesin assays for detection of muscular pathologies earlier than the current practices.

== Myomesin variants ==
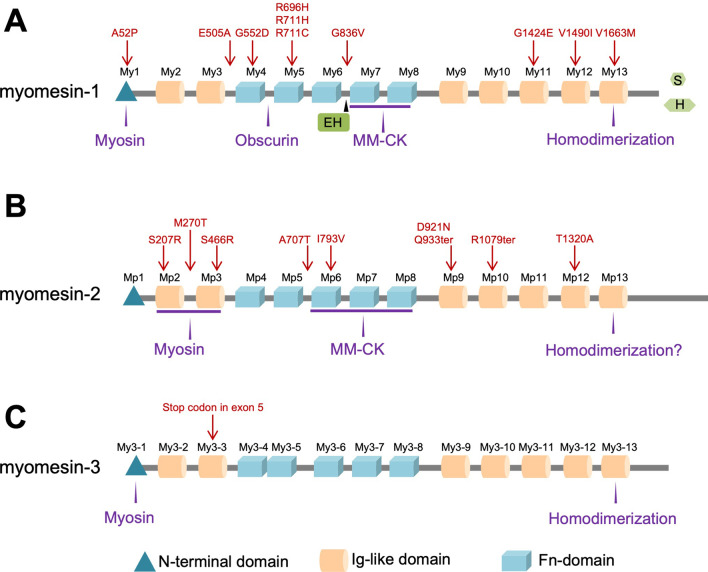
Domains of myomesin family. Binding partners are shown in purple. (a) myomesin 1: EH-sequence, S and H splicing variant are shown in green. (b) myomesin 2: has a noticeably smaller N-terminal than myomesin 1. (c) myomesin 3: shorter than myomesin 2.

There are three types of myomesin that are found in various striated muscles of the body: myomesin 1, myomesin 2, and myomesin 3. It is thought that each myomesin binds to myosin in a different spot, regulating the formation of the M-band.

=== Myomesin 1 ===
Myomesin 1 is the most researched of the forms of myomesin due to its presence in all striated muscles and that it is the largest of the myomesin class. It is sometimes just simply called myomesin because of it widespread expression. Myomesin 1 is found in mainly on the M4/M4' lines of the M-band. It is encoded by the MYOM1 gene. There are two variants of myomesin 1, one located between the My6 and My7 domains, and the other at the end of the C-terminal after the My13 domain. The prior is known as the embryonic heart (EH)-sequence and the latter, which has only been found in birds, is called the H or S splice variant (H is for heart and S is for skeletal). EH-myomesin can be found during embryonic development of the human heart (later replaced by myomesin 2). As the muscle matures, EH-myomesin is downregulated in favor of myomesin 1 with no genetic variations.

=== Myomesin 2 ===
Myomesin 2 (also known as M-protein) is located in the M1 line of the M-band. It is encoded by the MYOM2 gene. There is currently only one known variant of myomesin 2 and it can be found in fast skeletal muscles and adult cardiac muscles. Myomesin 2 has been shown to have an inverse relationship with the expression of EH-myomesin; as cardiac muscles mature, EH-myomesin is downregulated while myomesin 2 is upregulated.

=== Myomesin 3 ===
Myomesin 3 is the least researched in the myomesin class due to it being the most recently discovered. It is encoded by the MYOM3 gene. It is located in the M6/M6' lines of the M-band and is expressed in intermediate skeletal muscles and adult cardiac muscles (specifically in the left ventricle and left atrium). MYOM3 is especially expressed in neonatal skeletal muscles, extraocular muscles, slow muscles, and IIA skeletal fibers. Myomesin 3 is the only member of the myomesin protein family to be completely absent from cardiac expression. Myomesin 3 displays an inverse relationship with myomesin 2.

== Pathologies ==
=== Myocardial atrophy ===
Deficiency in myomesin 1 causes atrophy and dysfunction in its tissue. In cardiomyocytes, sarcomere length and uniformity are decreased when MYOM1 is absent, resulting in smaller cardiomyocytes. This is also linked to issues in contractile function due to the disruption of calcium levels in the tissue.

=== Dilated cardiomyopathy (DCM) ===
Re-emergence of EH-myomesin in adult cardiac muscles has been associated with dilated cardiomyopathy. It is still uncertain if this expression is to help stabilize the sarcomere during strenuous contractions or if it is a result of misaligned sarcomere filaments due to lessened contractile forces. It has been shown that this uncommon expression is the result of altered alternative splicing.
