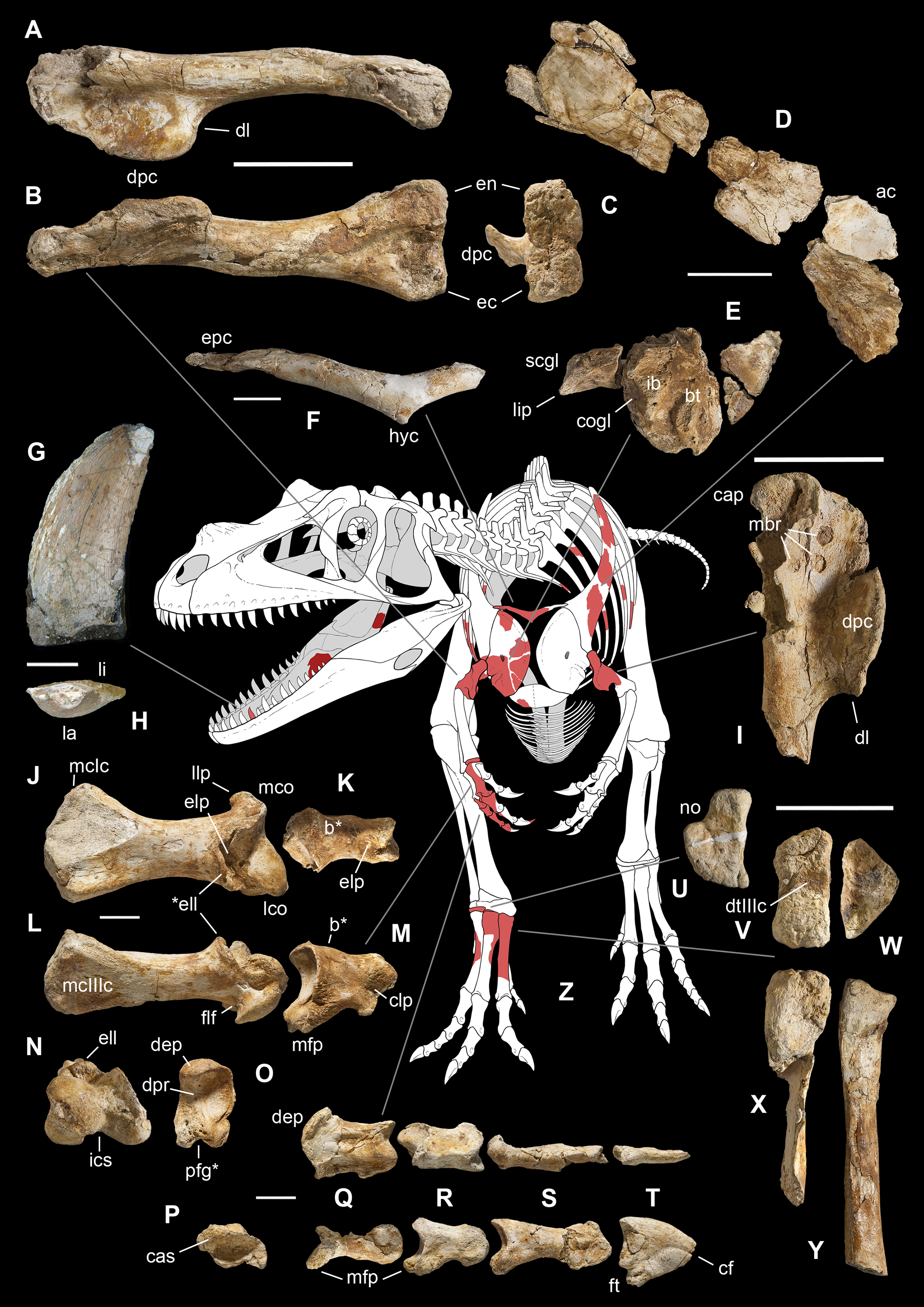
- Selected elements of the holotype

Scientific classification
- Kingdom: Animalia
- Phylum: Chordata
- Class: Reptilia
- Clade: Dinosauria
- Clade: Saurischia
- Clade: Theropoda
- Clade: †Ceratosauria
- Genus: †Saltriovenator; Dal Sasso et al. 2018
- Species: †S. zanellai

Binomial name
- †Saltriovenator zanellai Dal Sasso et al. 2018

= Saltriovenator =

Saltriovenator Temporal range: Early Sinemurian ~199.3–197.5 Ma

Extinct genus of dinosaurs

Saltriovenator (meaning "Saltrio hunter") is a genus of ceratosaurian dinosaur that lived during the Sinemurian stage of the Early Jurassic in what is now Italy. The type and only species is Saltriovenator zanellai; in the past, the species had been known under the informal name "saltriosaur". Although a full skeleton has not yet been discovered, Saltriovenator is thought to have been a large, bipedal carnivore similar to Ceratosaurus.

== Discovery and naming ==
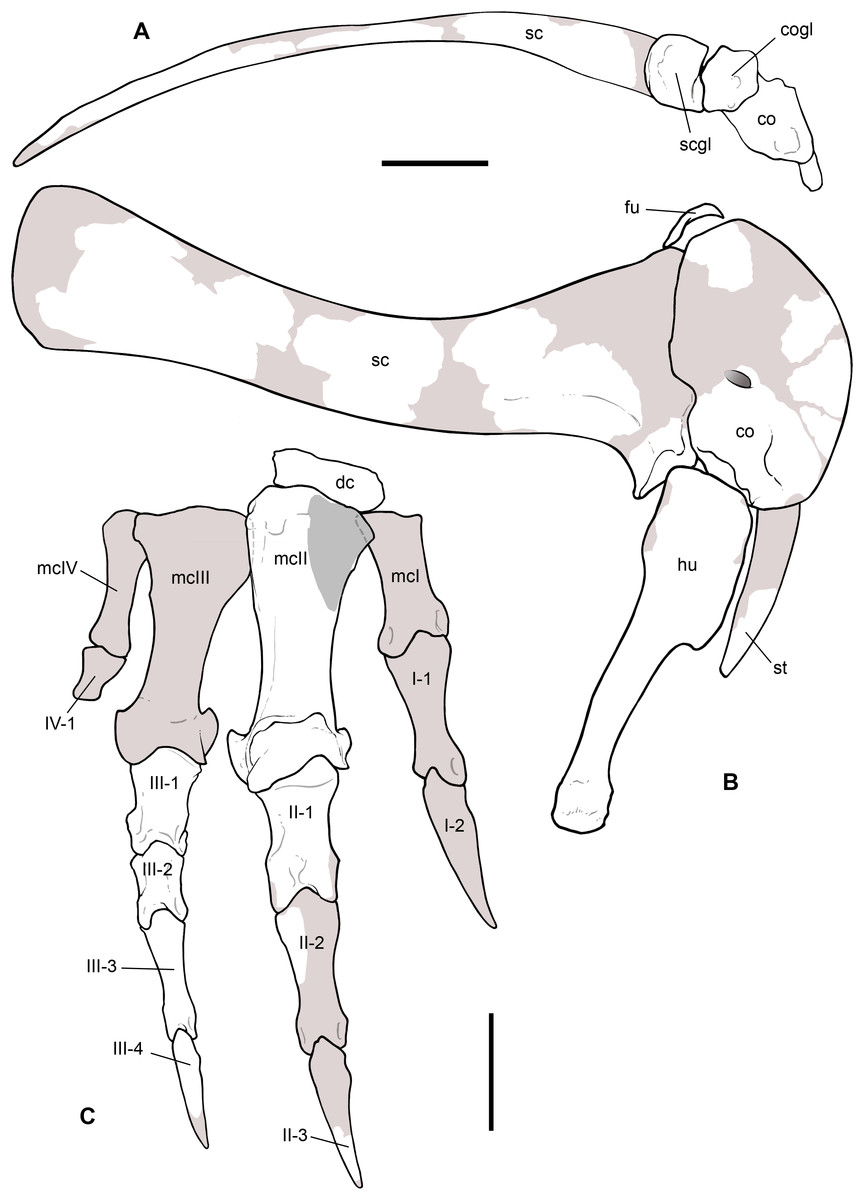
Reconstruction of the pectoral girdle and forelimb of Saltriovenator zanellai

On 4 August 1996, the first remains of Saltriovenator were discovered by amateur paleontologist Angelo Zanella, searching for ammonites in the Salnova marble quarry in Saltrio, northern Italy. Zanella had already been working for the Museo Civico di Storia Naturale di Milano and this institution after being informed sent out a team to investigate the find. Cristiano Dal Sasso and the volunteers of the Paleontological Group of Besano, under the direction of Giorgio Teruzzi managed to salvage a number of chalk blocks visibly containing bones. The skeleton had shortly before its discovery been blown to pieces by explosives used in the quarry to break the marble layers. Blocks that had been secured were inserted into a bath of formic acid for 1,800 hours to free the bones. Initially, 119 bone fragments were reported to have been collected in total; this was later increased to 132. However, most cannot be exactly identified.

In 2000, the museum opened a special exhibition of the bones. On this occasion, Dal Sasso provisionally gave the dinosaur, now thought to be a species new to science, the Italian name Saltriosauro. Although this has been occasionally Latinised to "Saltriosaurus", even in the scientific literature, in both the Italian and Latin form it remained an invalid nomen nudum.

In December 2018, Dal Sasso, Simone Maganuco and Andrea Cau named and described the specimen as the type species Saltriovenator zanellai. The generic name combines a reference to Saltrio with Latin, venator, "hunter", a common suffix in the names of theropods. The authors pointed out that a venator is also a type of Roman gladiator. The specific name honours Zanella. Because the article was published in an electronic publication, Life Science Identifiers were necessary to make the name valid. These are 8C9F3B56-F622-4C39-8E8B-C2E890811E74 for the genus and BDD366A7-6A9D-4A32-9841-F7273D8CA00B for the species. Saltriovenator is the third dinosaur named from Italy, the first from the Alps and the second theropod from Italy, after Scipionyx.

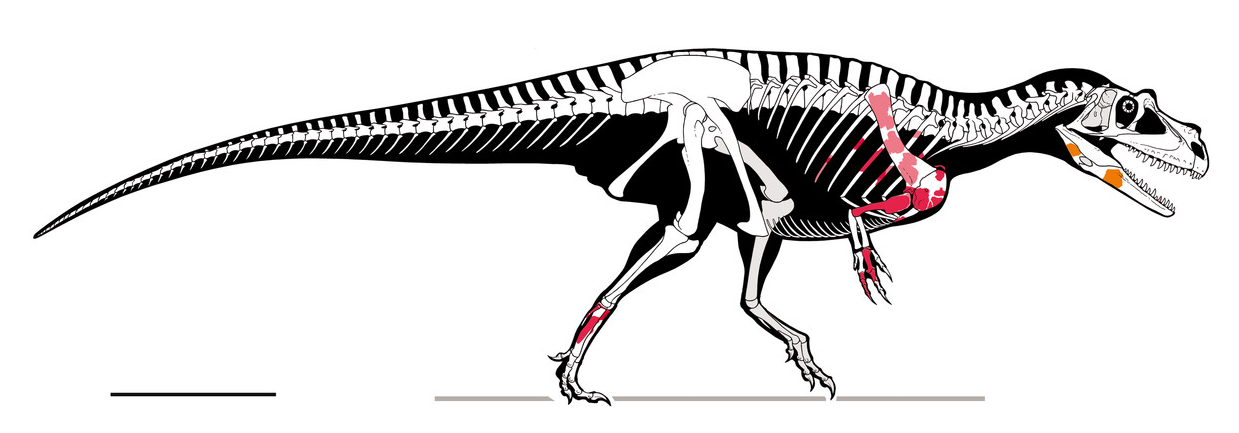
Skeletal diagram

The holotype, MSNM V3664, was found in a layer of the Saltrio Formation dating from the earliest early Sinemurian, 199 million years old. It consists of a fragmentary skeleton with a lower jaw. About 10% of the skeleton has been discovered, including a tooth, a right splenial, a right prearticular, a neck rib, fragments of the dorsal ribs and scapulae, a well preserved but incomplete furcula, humeri, metacarpal II, phalanx II-1, phalanx III-1, phalanx III-2, manual ungual III, a distal tarsal III, a distal tarsal IV and the proximal second to fifth metatarsals. The holotype individual likely died on the shores of an ancient beach before being washed out to sea. After death, the skeletal remains suffered from prolonged transport, during which many bones were lost and the remaining ones highly fragmented.

Although Saltriovenator was not aquatic, the environment in which the carcass was deposited was likely pelagic, judging by the associated ammonites. The locality is also rich in crinoids, gastropods, bivalves, brachiopods and bryozoans. Deposition occurred on a slope between a shallow carbonate platform and a deeper basin. Various scratches, grooves, and striations indicate that the carcass was subject to scavenging by marine invertebrates. The specimen represents a subadult individual, nearing its maximum size, of which the age has been estimated at twenty-four years.

== Description ==
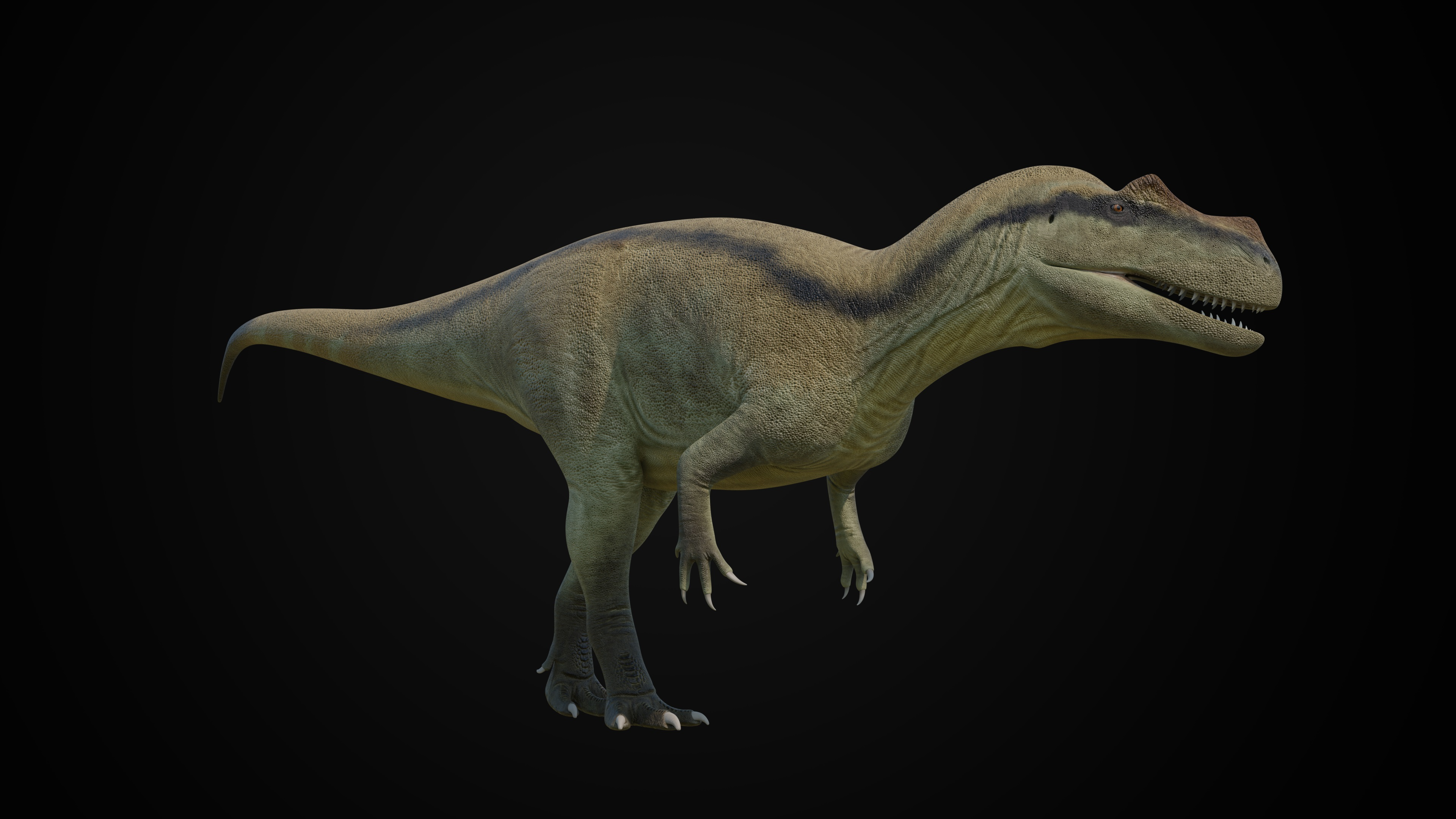
Restoration of Saltriovenator

Because of the fragmentary nature of the remains, it was impossible to directly measure the size of the animal. The describing authors therefore compared the fossils with those of two theropods of a roughly similar volume. Comparing with the skeletal elements of MOR 693, an Allosaurus fragilis specimen, they conservatively concluded that the Saltriovenator holotype individual was at least seven to eight metres long. This would make Saltriovenator the largest known theropod living before the Aalenian stage, 25% longer than Ceratosaurus from the late Jurassic. Comparing with Ceratosaurus itself, resulted in a body length of 730 centimetres, a hip height of 220 centimetres and a skull length of eighty centimetres. The thighbone length would then have been about eighty to eighty-seven centimetres, which indicates a body weight of 1160 to 1524 kilogrammes. Another method consisted in extrapolating from the known length of the forelimb. Applying the usual limb ratio indicated a hindlimb length of 198 centimetres. The thighbone would then have been 822 to 887 millimetres long, indicating a weight of 1269 to 1622 kilogrammes.

== Classification ==
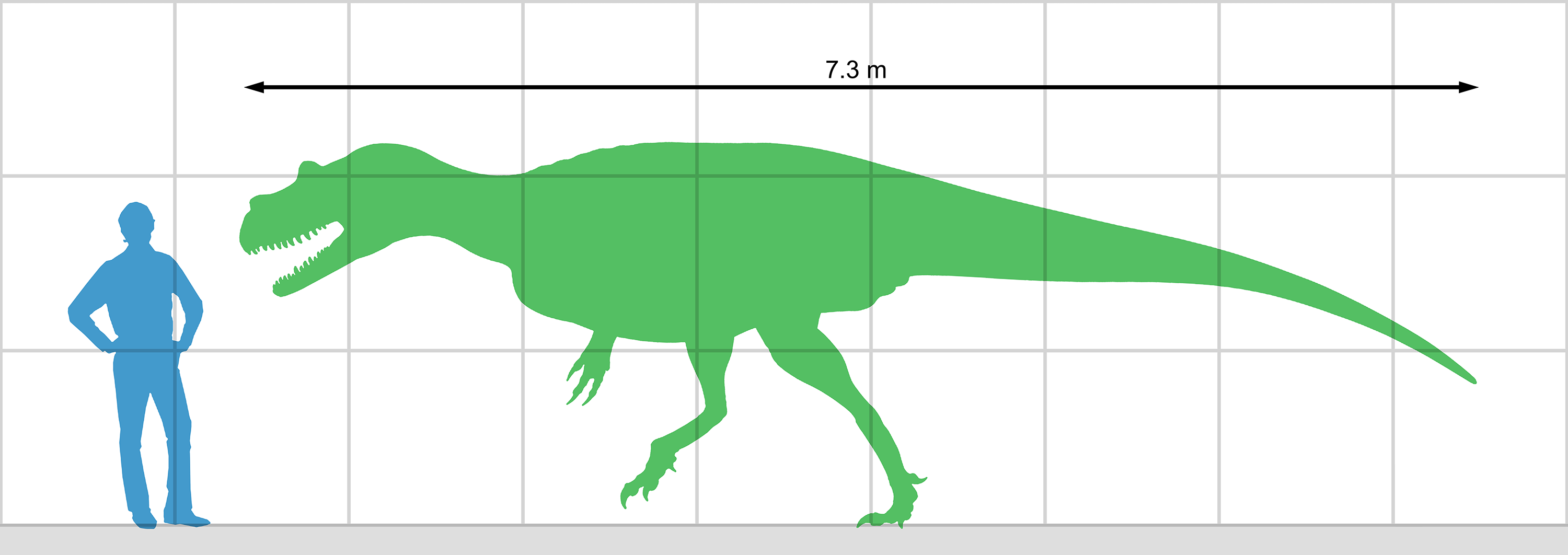
Size of Saltriovenator when scaled by material known from closely related Ceratosaurus

The precise systematic position of Saltriovenator has been traditionally uncertain, but it is known to be a theropod. Dal Sasso originally referred it to the Tetanurae He later considered that it may represent an allosauroid, although in either case it would predate other members of the clades by roughly 20-30 million years. Benson considered it a member of Coelophysoidea in his review of Magnosaurus. The presence of a wishbone may support its placement as a tetanuran, although wishbones have been reported from coelophysoids.

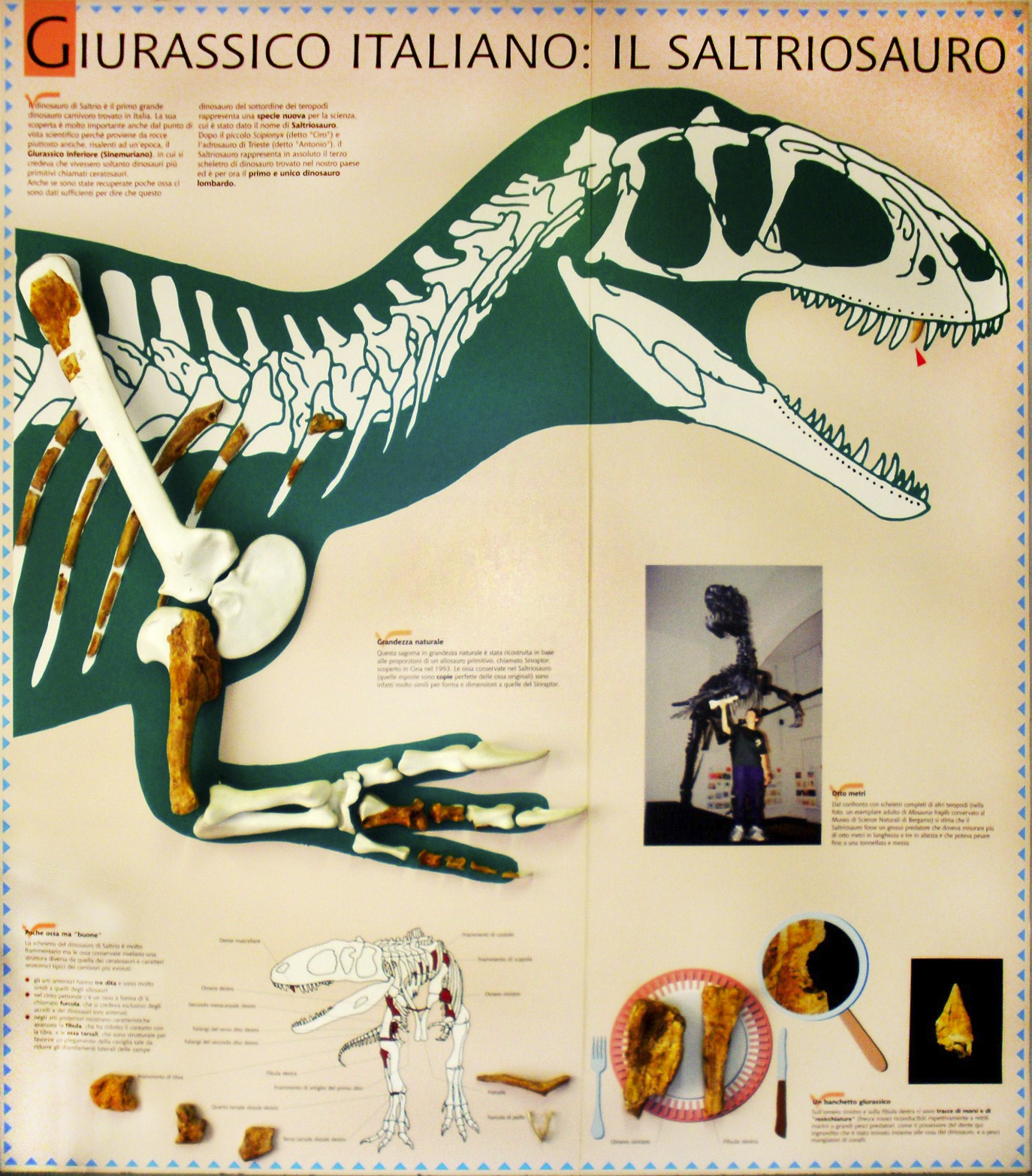
Selected elements of the holotype

The 2018 description paper ran a large phylogenetic analysis, and found it to be a basal ceratosaur, the sister-taxon of Berberosaurus. The phylogenetic analysis is as shown:

- Dinosauria
  - Ornithischia
  - Saurischia
    - Sauropodomorpha
    - Theropoda
      - Herrerasauridae
      - - Eodromaeus
        - - Buriolestes
          - - Dracoraptor
            - Neotheropoda
              - Coelophysoidea (incl. Liliensternus and Zupaysaurus)
              - - Dilophosauridae
                  - Sarcosaurus
                  - Cryolophosaurus
                  - Dilophosaurus
                - - Sinosaurus
                  - Averostra
                    - Ceratosauria
                      - - Berberosaurus
                        - Saltriovenator
                      - - Ceratosauridae
                          - Genyodectes
                          - Ceratosaurus
                        - - Eoabelisaurus
                          - - Elaphrosaurus
                            - - Austrocheirus
                              - - - MNN TIG6
                                  - Limusaurus
                                - - Noasaurinae
                                    - Masiakasaurus
                                    - Noasaurus
                                  - Abelisauroidea
                    - Tetanurae
                      - Szechuanosaurus
                      - - Xuanhanosaurus
                        - Orionides
                          - - Megalosauroidea
                            - Allosauroidea
                          - Coelurosauria

== Paleoenvironment ==
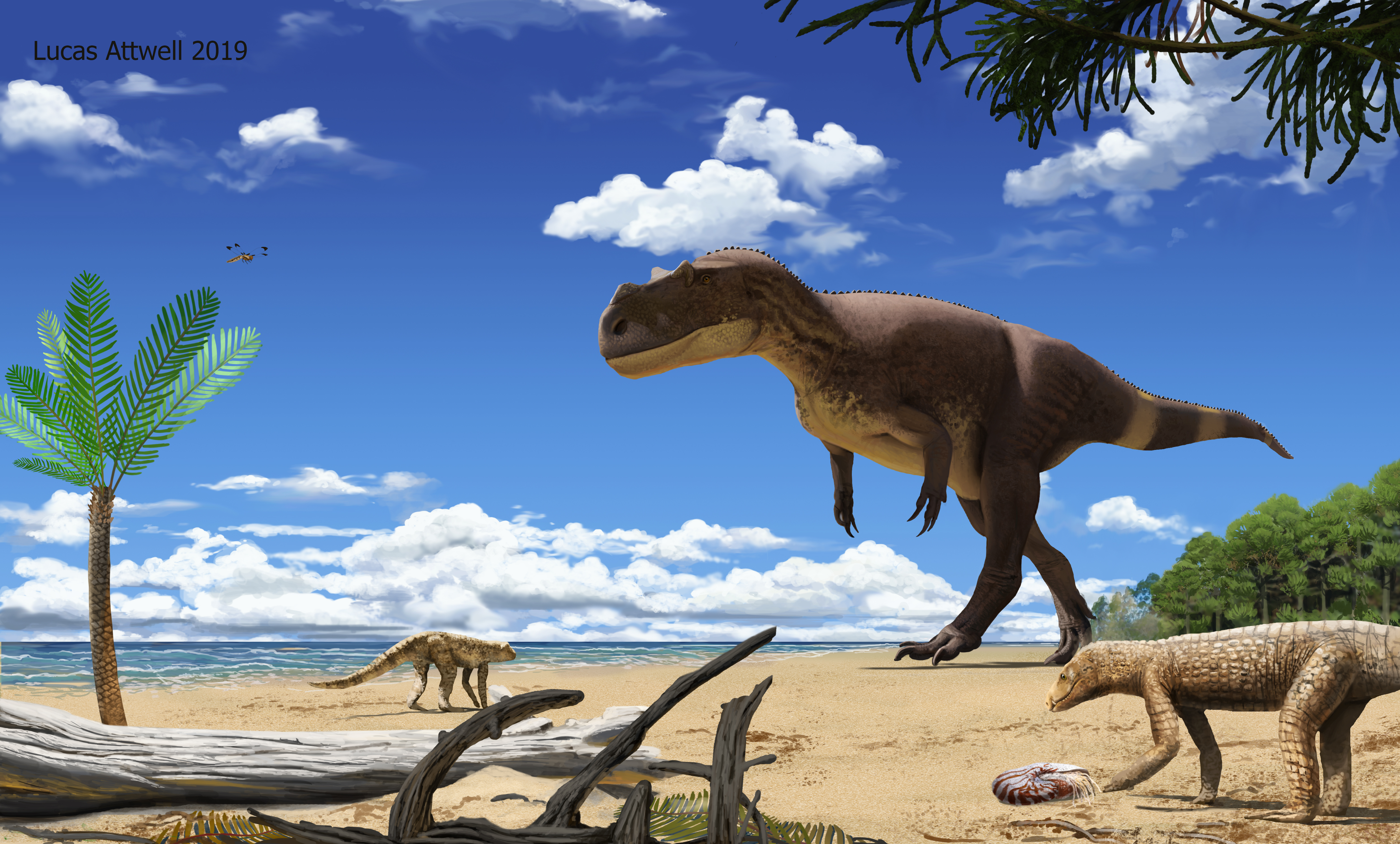
Saltriovenator on a beach. The holotype was washed from a nearby emerged landmass

Saltriovenator was found on an open marine environment, where it was probably washed from the nearest mainland, being scavenged by invertebrates as proven by the presence of Sedilichnus sp. on the bones. This depositional environment, part of the Saltrio Formation is considered as part of a proximal slope or ramp that was probably an open subtidal zone reached by the effects of storm waves and with constant bottom currents. During the late Hettangian to early Sinemurian, the western Lombardy Basin formed part of the Southern Alps area, passive margin of Adria and formed part of an evolving rift system linked to the western Tethys, where horst-and-graben tectonics created alternating shallow platforms and subsiding troughs. Structural highs such as Monte Campo dei Fiori, the Varese-Arbostora swell, and Monte Nudo defined the basin architecture, producing shallow carbonate platforms, emergent land, and subsiding depocenters.

Nearby emerged areas are known at Briançonnais with the bauxite rich “Siderolitico” linked to long emersion phase (Ladinian-Bathonian) and Western Tauern with graphitic schists and quartzites & sandy marble, overall pointing to the Lombardian sector acting as a possible land bridge with Laurasia, connected with the Calcari Grigi Group in the Trento carbonate Platform, based on Theropod tracks of similar size to Saltriovenator. This tracks may imply a similar taxon or the own Saltriovenator, had a greater range into the Hettangian and was able to cross into the Trento area, if so, it would have been coeval with Gongxianosaurus-like, Sinosaurus-like, Coelophysis-like and Lesothosaurus-like dinosaurs, know only by it´s tracks, all living in a Bahamas-like archipelago. The main inner land was the Malossa-Zandobbio palaeohigh system in the Po Plain, tied with the Saltrio area by a regional belt of positive blocks. This Highs, if assumed as a single unit probably got 1,000-3,000 km² of intermittently exposed terrain for the inner lands and 22,500 km² in total of intermittently exposed lombardian terrain. If somehow was connected to the Trento area it could lead to 45,000-80,000 km² of exposed land.

Indicators of subaerial conditions are seen at Castello Cabiaglio-Orino, thick "terra rossa" paleosols developed directly above the Rhaetian Zu Limestone, showing rhizoliths, alveolar structures, and meteoric diagenesis. Palynological assemblages from these horizons indicate Hirmeriellaceae-dominated forests and understory of Lycopsid-Ferns, as well potential Characeae, adapted to marsh or ponded settings in a Tropical subhumid climate. These emerged lands bordered a gulf-shaped embayment, open northward, where shallow-marine carbonate platforms alternated with rapidly subsiding basins. Towards the Early Sinemurian the Arbostora swell submerged into a shallow open sea (ramp-slope), still bordered south and southwest by emerged land supported by terrigenous sands from eroded igneous/metamorphic rocks and terrestrial plants in the limestones. This theropod was probably the largest predator on the region.

== See also ==
- Timeline of ceratosaur research
