= MYOM1 =

Protein-coding gene in humans

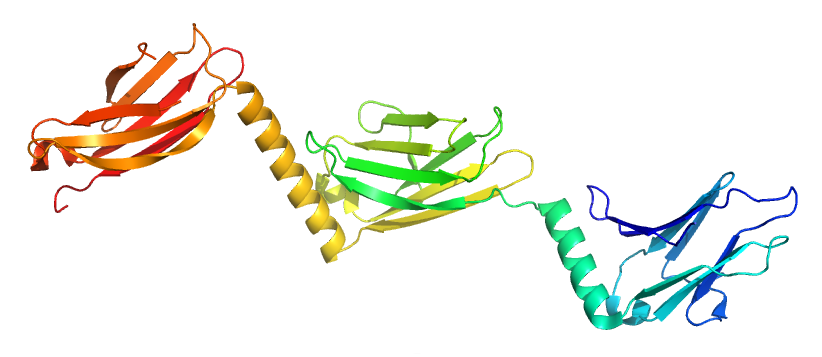

Identifiers
- Aliases: MYOM1, SKELEMIN, myomesin 1
- External IDs: OMIM: 603508; MGI: 1341430; GeneCards: MYOM1
Available structures
PDB	Ortholog search: PDBe RCSB
PDB	List of PDB id codes 2R15, 2Y23, 2Y25, 3RBS

Gene location (Human)
Chr.	Chromosome 18 (human)
Band	18p11.31	Start	3,066,807 bp
Band	18p11.31	End	3,219,968 bp

Gene location (Mouse)
Chr.	Chromosome 17 (mouse)
Band	17|17 E1.3	Start	71,309,628 bp
Band	17|17 E1.3	End	71,433,851 bp
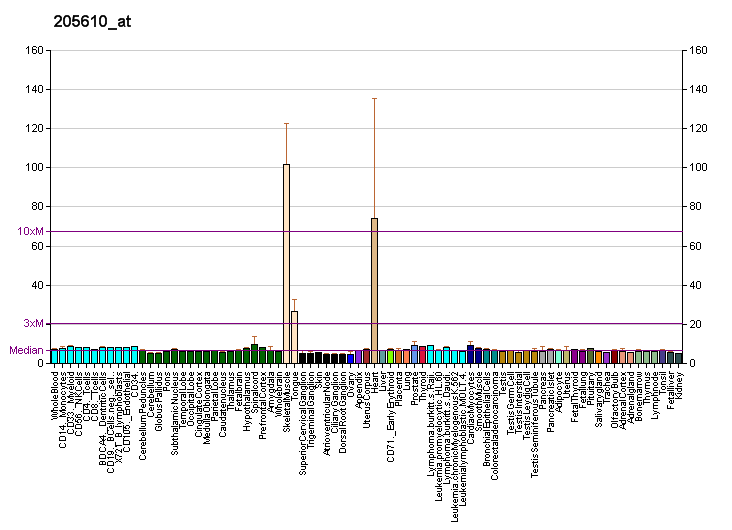
RNA expression pattern
Bgee	Human / Mouse (ortholog); Top expressed in: muscle of thigh; Skeletal muscle tissue of rectus abdominis; Skeletal muscle tissue of biceps brachii; glutes; apex of heart; gastrocnemius muscle; triceps brachii muscle; left ventricle; vastus lateralis muscle; right auricle of heart / Top expressed in: triceps brachii muscle; temporal muscle; muscle of thigh; sternocleidomastoid muscle; digastric muscle; triceps surae; gastrocnemius muscle; medial head of gastrocnemius muscle; vastus lateralis muscle; tibialis anterior muscle; More reference expression data
BioGPS	More reference expression data
Gene ontology
Molecular function	structural constituent of muscle; protein binding; protein homodimerization activity; identical protein binding; actin filament binding; muscle alpha-actinin binding; structural molecule activity conferring elasticity; kinase binding
Cellular component	cytoplasm; myosin filament; sarcomere; striated muscle myosin thick filament; Z discdkac; M band; striated muscle thin filament
Biological process	muscle contraction; extraocular skeletal muscle development; striated muscle contraction; actin filament organization; sarcomere organization; striated muscle myosin thick filament assembly; positive regulation of gene expression; protein kinase A signaling; positive regulation of protein secretion; skeletal muscle thin filament assembly; skeletal muscle myosin thick filament assembly; cardiac myofibril assembly; cardiac muscle tissue morphogenesis
Sources:Amigo / QuickGO
Orthologs
Databases	NCBI: entry; OMA: entry
Species	Human	Mouse
Entrez	8736	17929
Ensembl	ENSG00000101605	ENSMUSG00000024049
UniProt	P52179	Q62234
RefSeq (mRNA)	NM_003803; NM_019856	NM_001083934; NM_010867
RefSeq (protein)	NP_003794; NP_062830	NP_001077403; NP_034997
Location (UCSC)	Chr 18: 3.07 – 3.22 Mb	Chr 17: 71.31 – 71.43 Mb
PubMed search
- Wikidata
View/Edit Human	View/Edit Mouse

Myomesin-1 is a protein that in humans is encoded by the MYOM1 gene. Myomesin-1 is expressed in muscle cells and functions to stabilize the three-dimensional conformation of the thick filament. Embryonic forms of Myomesin-1 have been detected in dilated cardiomyopathy.

== Structure ==
Alternatively spliced variants of MYOM1, including EH-myomesin, Skelemin and Myomesin-1 have been identified; with Skelemin having an additional 96 amino acids rich in serine and proline residues. Myomesin-1, like myomesin 2 and titin, is a member of a family of myosin-associated proteins containing structural modules with strong homology to either fibronectin type III (motif I) or immunoglobulin C2 (motif II) domains. Myomesin-1 bears uniqueness within this family in that it has intermediate filament core-like motifs, one near each terminus. Myomesin-1 and Myomesin-2 each have a unique N-terminal region followed by 12 modules of motif I or motif II, in the arrangement II-II-I-I-I-I-I-II-II-II-II-II. The two proteins share 50% sequence identity in this repeat-containing region. The head structure formed by these 2 proteins on one end of the titin string extends into the center of the M band. Alternatively spliced, tissue-specific transcript variants encoding different isoforms have been identified. Myomesin-1 can dimerize in an anti-parallel fashion via its C-terminal region.

== Function ==
Titin, together with its associated proteins, interconnects the major structure of sarcomeres, the M bands and Z discs. The C-terminal end of the titin string extends into the M line, where it binds tightly to Myomesin-1 and myomesin 2. Skelemin/Myomesin-1 is concentrated at peripheral regions of M-bands, and is postulated to link myofibrils with the intermediate filament cytoskeleton. Skelemin/Myomesin-1 has been detected in the nucleus as well as the cytoskeletal, suggesting that it may play a role in gene expression. Myomesin-1 functions to mediate stretch-induced signaling, and the EH-myomesin splice variant, expressed in embryonic hearts and in dilated cardiomyopathy, can modulate its elasticity.

== Clinical Significance ==
The fetal EH-myomesin alternatively spliced form of MYOM1 has been shown to be reexpressed at an early timepoint in the progression of dilated cardiomyopathy, coincident with isoform switches in titin.

MYOM1 has also been shown to be abnormally spliced in patients with myotonic dystrophy type I; specifically, exon 17a.

== Interactions ==
Skelemin/Myomesin-1 has been shown to interact with:

- ITGB1
- ITGB3
- ITGA2B
- MYH7
- Titin
- PNKD
