= John Ruben =

American paleontologist

John A. Ruben is a researcher in Zoology and Vertebrate paleontology at the Oregon State University in Corvallis, United States. Much of his published research is focused on studying the respiratory system in birds, in order to contradict the theory of theropodan ancestry of birds, as well as their metabolism.

== Research ==
Ruben has questioned for many years the theory that birds descend from small carnivorous dinosaurs of suborder Theropoda. He suggests theropods had a diaphragma-driven respiratory system which could not have evolved into the complex air sacs in birds. (The presence of air sacs in saurischian dinosaurs has been demonstrated by highly pneumatic fossil bones of e.g. Aerosteon and Tataouinea.)

While some have claimed Ruben's research to be flawed, his papers have appeared in peer-reviewed journals such as Science, Nature and the Journal of Morphology. He has done some research on the dinosaurs Scipionyx and Sinosauropteryx, from which he makes his arguments.

Ruben took part in the 2009 discovery of a close correlation between the immobilized thighbone and complex respiratory systems in birds.

Research on the fossil animal Microraptor has also led Ruben to suggest that Dromaeosauridae, for a long time regarded as feathered dinosaurs, actually represent flightless descendants of older birds, as he said: "We think the evidence is showing that these animals which are usually considered dinosaurs were actually descended from birds, not the other way around". Ruben sees it more possible that perhaps a creature like the diapsid reptile Longisquama represents the ancestor to birds.
