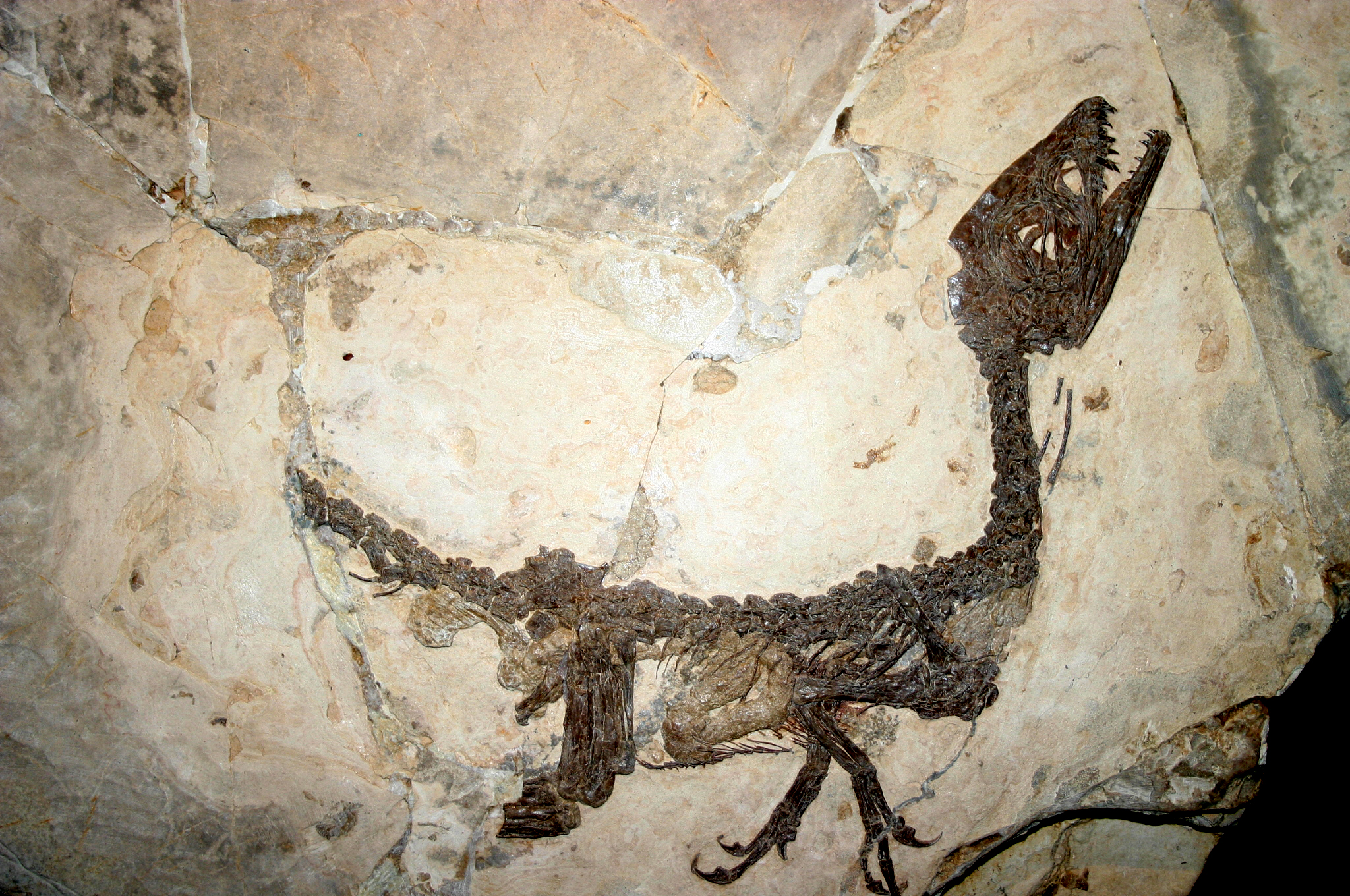
- Holotype specimen, Museo Civico di Storia Naturale di Milano

Scientific classification
- Kingdom: Animalia
- Phylum: Chordata
- Class: Reptilia
- Clade: Dinosauria
- Clade: Saurischia
- Clade: Theropoda
- Genus: †Scipionyx; Dal Sasso & Signore, 1998
- Species: †S. samniticus

Binomial name
- †Scipionyx samniticus Dal Sasso & Signore, 1998

= Scipionyx =

Scipionyx Temporal range: Albian, 113 Ma

Extinct genus of dinosaurs

Scipionyx (/ˈʃɪˌpiːoʊnɪks, ˌʃɪpiːˈoʊ-/ SHIH-pee-oh-nicks-, ship-ee-OH-) was a genus of theropod dinosaur from the Early Cretaceous Pietraroja Formation of Italy, around 113 million years ago.

There is only one fossil known of Scipionyx, discovered in 1981 by an amateur paleontologist and brought to the attention of science in 1993. In 1998 the type species Scipionyx samniticus was named, the generic name meaning "Scipio's claw". The find generated much publicity because of the unique preservation of large areas of petrified soft tissue and internal organs such as muscles and intestines. The fossil shows many details of these, even the internal structure of some muscle and bone cells. It was also the first dinosaur found in Italy. Because of the importance of the specimen, it has been intensely studied.

The fossil is that of a juvenile that was most likely a baby, at only 46.1 centimetres (18.1 in) long, and perhaps just three days old. Its adult form and size is unknown. Scipionyx was a bipedal predator, its horizontal rump balanced by a long tail. Its body was probably covered by primitive feathers but these have not been found in the fossil, that is without any skin remains. In the guts of the fossil some half-digested meals are still present, indicating Scipionyx ate lizards and fish. Several scientists have tried to learn from the position of the internal organs how Scipionyx breathed, but their conclusions often disagree.

The classification of Scipionyx is uncertain, due to the difficulties of classifying a taxon known only from such a young specimen. Most paleontologists have classified it as a member of Compsognathidae, a family of small coelurosaurs, but the paleontologist Andrea Cau has proposed it may belong to Carcharodontosauridae or just outside of Spinosauridae, both different families of large carnosaurs.

== History of discovery and naming ==
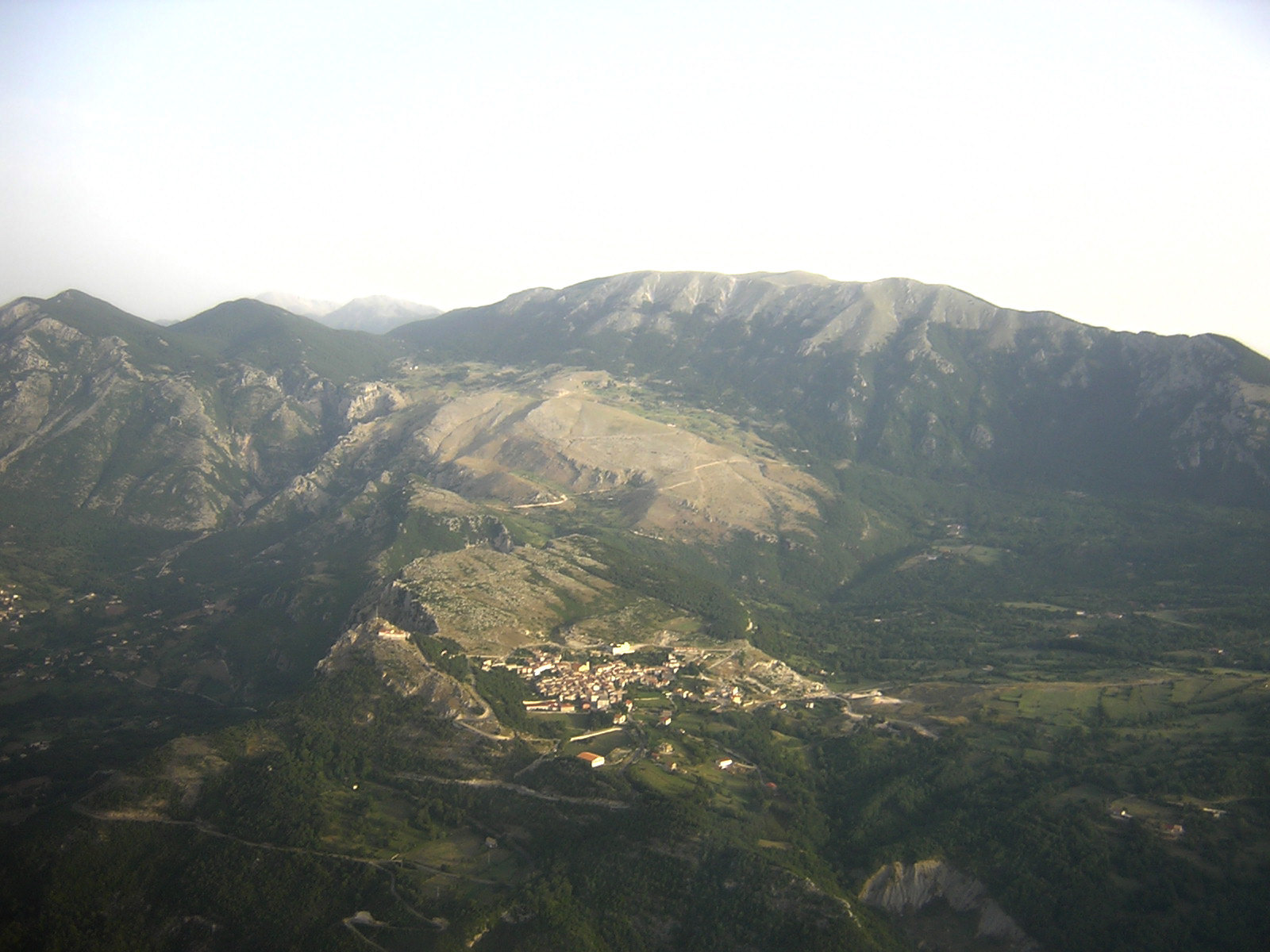
The village of Pietraroja with, immediately above it, the Le Cavere quarry

Scipionyx was discovered in the spring of 1981 by Giovanni Todesco, an amateur paleontologist, in the small Le Cavere quarry at the edge of the village of Pietraroja, approximately seventy kilometers northeast of Naples. The specimen was preserved in the marine Pietraroja Formation, well known for unusually well-conserved fossils. Todesco thought the remains belonged to an extinct bird. He prepared the strange discovery in the basement of his house in San Giovanni Ilarione near Verona, removing, without the use of any optical instrument, part of the chalk matrix from the top of the bones and covering them with vinyl glue. He strengthened the stone plate by adding pieces to its rim and on one of these he added a fake tail made from polyester resin as that of the fossil was largely lacking because he had failed to recover it completely. In early 1993 Todesco, who had nicknamed the animal cagnolino, "little doggie", after its toothy jaws, brought the specimen to the attention of paleontologist Giorgio Teruzzi of the Museo Civico di Storia Naturale di Milano, who identified it as the juvenile of a theropod dinosaur and nicknamed it Ambrogio after the patron saint of Milan, Ambrose. Not being an expert in the field of dinosaur studies himself, he called in the help of colleague Father Giuseppe Leonardi. In Italy such finds are by law State property and Todesco was convinced by science reporter Franco Capone to report the discovery to the authorities: on 15 October 1993 Todesco personally delivered the fossil to the Archaeological Directorship at Naples. The specimen was added to the collection of the regional Soprintendenza per i Beni Archeologici di Salerno, Avellino, Benevento e Caserta in Salerno, to which it officially still belongs; on 19 April 2002 it was given its own display at the Museo Archeologico di Benevento.

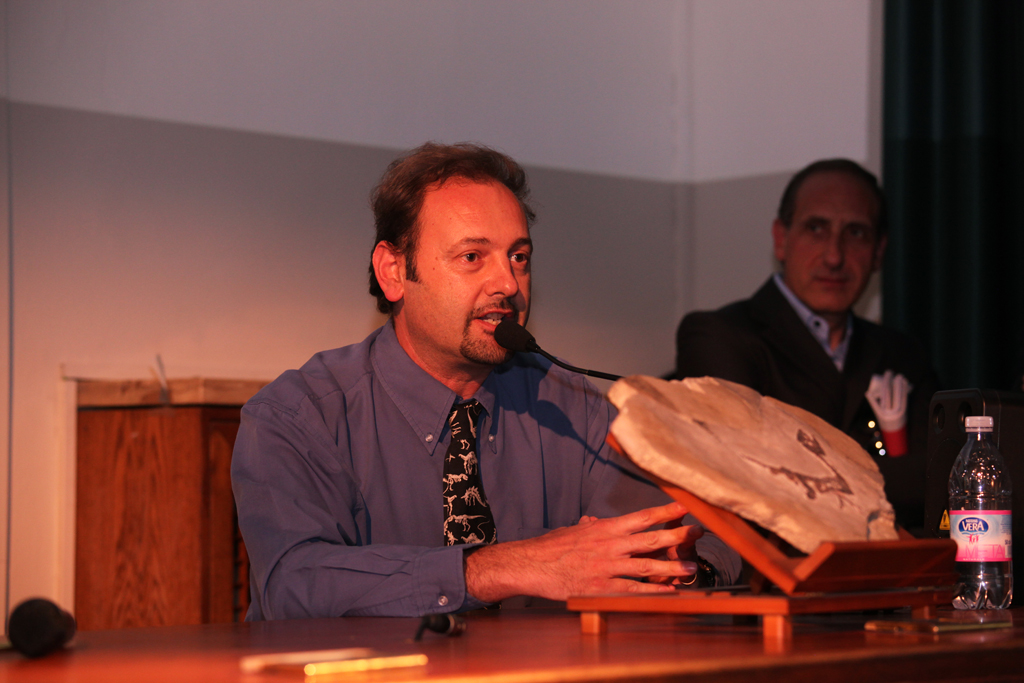
Cristiano Dal Sasso with a cast of the type specimen in 2012

In 1993 Teruzzi and Leonardi scientifically reported the find, which generated some publicity as it was the very first dinosaur found in Italy. The popular magazine Oggi simultaneously nicknamed the animal Ciro, a typical Neapolitan boy's name, an idea by chief-editor Pino Aprile. In 1994 Leonardi published a larger article about the discovery. In 1995 Marco Signore of the University of Naples Federico II submitted a thesis containing a lengthy description of the fossil, in which he named it "Dromaeodaimon irene". Because the thesis was unpublished this remained an invalid nomen ex dissertatione. Meanwhile, in Salerno, Sergio Rampinelli had begun a further preparation of the fossil, during three hundred hours of work removing the fake tail, replacing the vinyl glue with a modern resin preservative and finishing the uncovering of the bones. On this occasion it was discovered that large parts of the soft tissues had been preserved.

In 1998, Ciro because of this made the front cover of Nature, when the type species Scipionyx samniticus was named and described by Marco Signore and Cristiano Dal Sasso. The generic name Scipionyx comes from the Latin name Scipio and the Greek ὄνυξ, onyx, the combination meaning "Scipio's claw". "Scipio" refers to both Scipione Breislak, the 18th century geologist who wrote the first description of the formation in which the fossil was found and Scipio Africanus, the famous Roman consul fighting Hannibal. The specific name samniticus means "From Samnium", the Latin name of the region around Pietraroja. Several other names had been considered but rejected, such as "Italosaurus", "Italoraptor" and "Microraptor". The last name has since been used for a genus of "four-winged" dromaeosaurid discovered in China a few years later.

The holotype, SBA-SA 163760, dates from the early Albian, about 110 million years old, and consists of an almost complete skeleton of a juvenile individual, lacking only the end of the tail, the lower legs and the claw of the right second finger. Extensive soft tissues have been preserved but no parts of the skin or any integument such as scales or feathers.

In view of the exceptional importance of the find, between December 2005 and October 2008 the fossil was intensively studied in Milan resulting in a monograph by dal Sasso and Simone Maganuco published in 2011, containing the most extensive description of a single dinosaur species ever.

In 2021, the Italian paleontologist Andrea Cau proposed that the holotype of Scipionyx is a hatchling carcharodontosaur. Later, in 2024, Cau published a new paper that recovered Scipionyx in a polytomy with Wiehenvenator, Iberospinus, and the rest of Spinosauridae.

== Description ==
=== Size ===
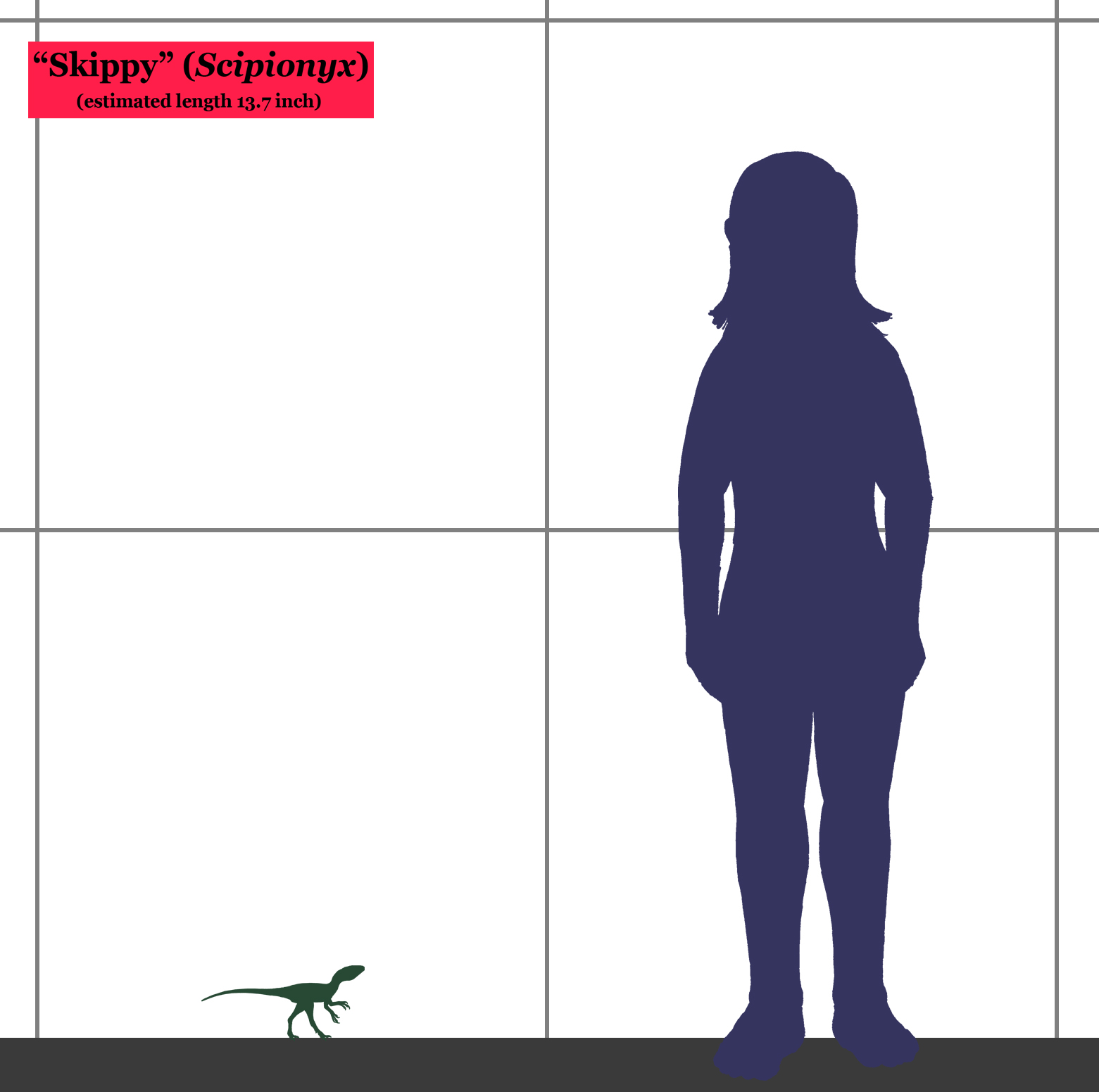
Size of the juvenile specimen compared with a human

The holotype of Scipionyx represents a very small individual, the preserved length of which is estimated at just 23.7 centimetres (9.3 in). In 2011, dal Sasso and Maganuco estimated its total length, including the missing tail section, at 46.1 centimetres (18.1 in). The specimen was not much smaller than known embryos or hatchlings of Lourinhanosaurus and Allosaurus, theropods of considerable magnitude. However, given its affinities with the Compsognathidae, it is likely that the adult size of Scipionyx did not surpass that of the largest known compsognathid, Sinocalliopteryx, which itself measures 2.37 metres (7.8 ft) in length. As the hatchling would have fitted within an egg about 11 centimetres (4.3 in) long and 6 centimetres (2.4 in) wide, this would have implied a rather high egg size compared to the adult body length.

=== General build ===
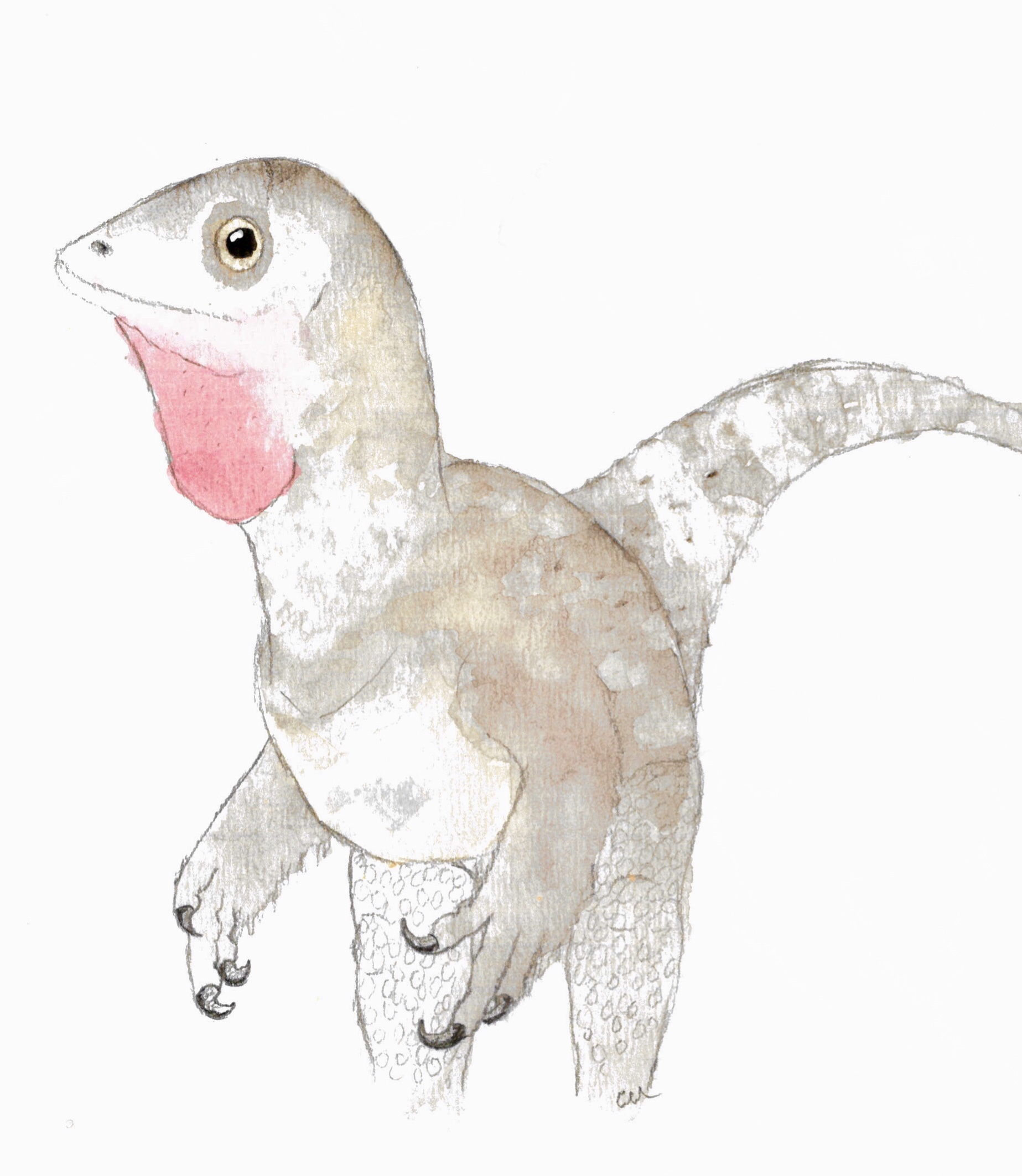
Life restoration

Because the holotype is a hatchling of perhaps only a few days old, it is hard to determine the build of the adult animal but some general conclusions can be reliably made. Scipionyx was a small bipedal predator. Its horizontal rump was balanced by a long tail. The neck was relatively long and slender. The hindlimbs and especially the forelimbs were rather elongated. Dal Sasso & Maganuco considered it likely that a coat of primitive protofeathers was present, as these are also known from some direct relatives.

=== Diagnostic traits ===
The 2011 study established eight unique derived traits or autapomorphies in which Scipionyx differed from its closest relatives. The praemaxilla has five teeth. Where the parietal and the frontal bone make contact, the depression in which the supratemporal fenestra, a skull roof opening, was present, shows a sinuous ridge on the postorbital. The lower branch of the squamosal has a rectangular end. The wrist consists of just two, superimposed, bones: a radial and a lower element formed by a fusion of the first and second carpal. This last element has the shape of a lens, not a crescent; is flattened; and is fused seamlessly. The first finger is conspicuously elongated, 23% longer than the third finger. The notch in the front edge of the ilium is directed to the front and only weakly developed. The front edge of the ischium shaft has a long obturator process with a rectangular end.

=== Skull ===
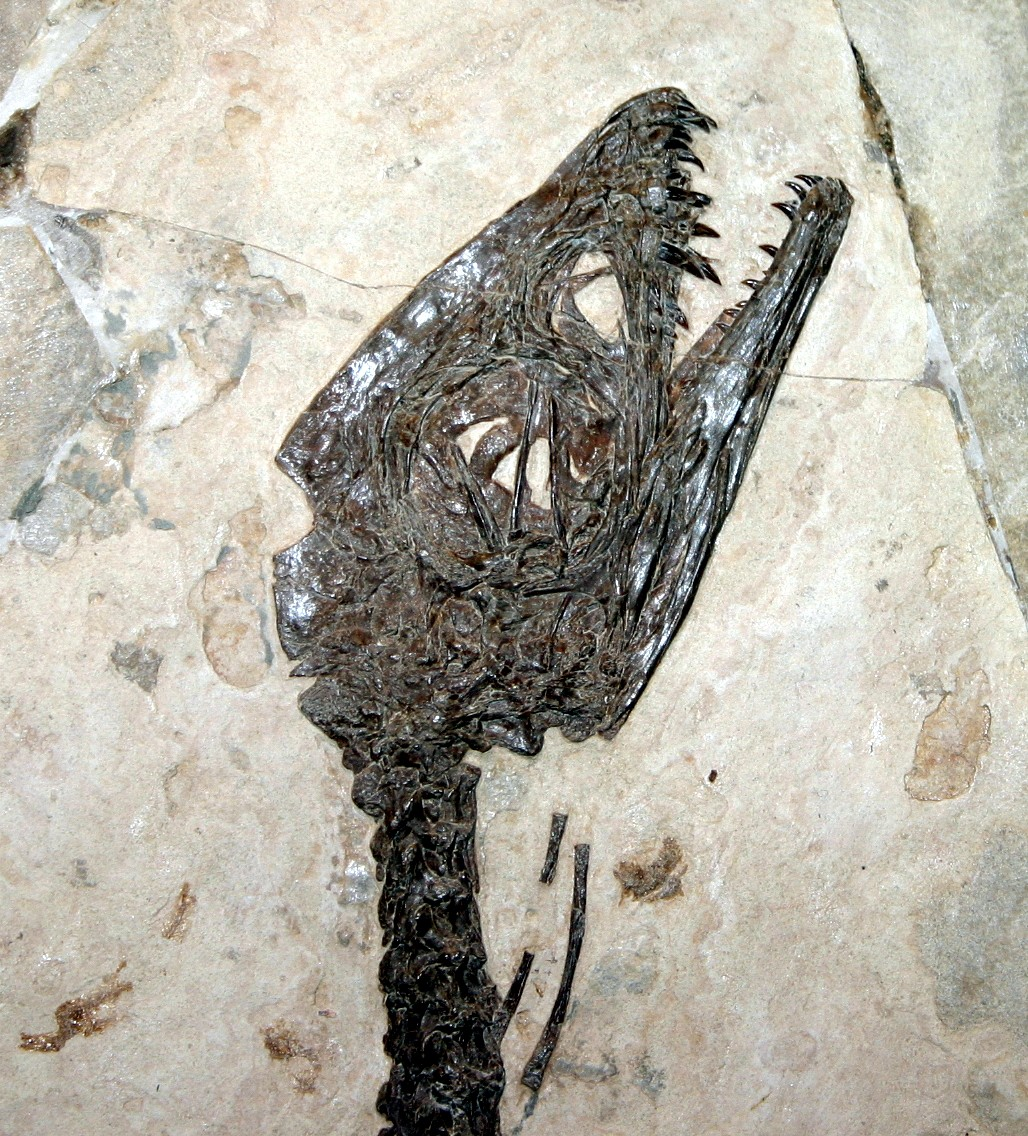
Skull, Museo Civico di Storia Naturale di Milano

The skull of the holotype is large, compared to the size of the body, and short with very large eye-sockets. This is largely due to its young age. Accordingly, the semi-circular antorbital fenestra, the normally largest skull opening, is short too and smaller than the eye-socket. In front of it two smaller openings are present: the maxillary and promaxillary. The snout is pointed with a low rounded tip. The premaxilla, the bone forming the front of the snout, carries five teeth. The maxilla behind it, is deep with a very short front branch. It carries seven teeth. The depression in its surface for the antorbital opening is bounded by a ridge. The lacrimal is robust and lacks a horn; its side is not pierced by a foramen. The prefrontal is exceptionally large, forming a large part of the front upper edge of the eye-socket. The frontal bones have a transverse ridge at their back. Between the frontals and the parietals the skull roof over a limited distance has not closed yet, resulting in a conspicuous diamond-shaped opening, a fontanelle that was first mistaken for damage inflicted on the fossil during the first preparation. On its inner side the supratemporal fenestra has no depression, being bounded by a high edge of the parietal. The jugal has no front vertical branch towards the lacrimal. The quadrate bone has on its front edge a large wing-like expansion, touching the pterygoid. The bones of the braincase are largely inaccessible but a small inner ear opening, the recessus tympanicus dorsalis, is visible. The underside of the braincase lacks an inflated part or bulla.

The lower jaw is straight and elongated. The jaw bone is rather low: the specimen creates the illusion of a strong jaw because the left jaw is visible below the right one. It bears ten teeth. In the 1998 description a part of the splenial was mistaken for a supradentarium and the angular was misidentified as the surangular because in the fossil it had been displaced upwards, creating the false impression an external mandibular fenestra, an opening in the outer side of the jaw, would be present.

Scipionyx has five teeth in the premaxilla, seven in the maxilla and ten in the dentary of the lower jaw for a total of twenty-two per side and a grand total for the head of forty-four. The number of five premaxillary teeth is surprising, as a total of four is normal for compsognathids: otherwise, only some Carnosauria have five. Due to the young age of the specimen, the tooth replacement cycle had not started yet, causing a perfect dental symmetry between the left and the right jaws. The teeth lack the typical compsognathid shape with a suddenly recurving apex of the tooth crown. Instead, in general they curve gradually; only the largest teeth show something of a "kink". Exceptionally, the tooth row of the lower jaw extends further to the back than that of the upper jaw. The premaxillary teeth are pointed and lack denticles. The first four have an oval cross-section; the fifth is more flattened near its apex. The second and fifth teeth are the largest. The maxillary teeth are flattened with denticles on their trailing edges. The second and fourth maxillary teeth are the largest; the latter being the largest tooth of all. Of the ten teeth of the lower jaw, the first two are rather straight with an oval cross-section and lack denticles. The third tooth has denticles at its base and a flatter top; the other seven are more recurved and flattened along their entire height; gradually the denticles reach the apex.

=== Postcrania ===
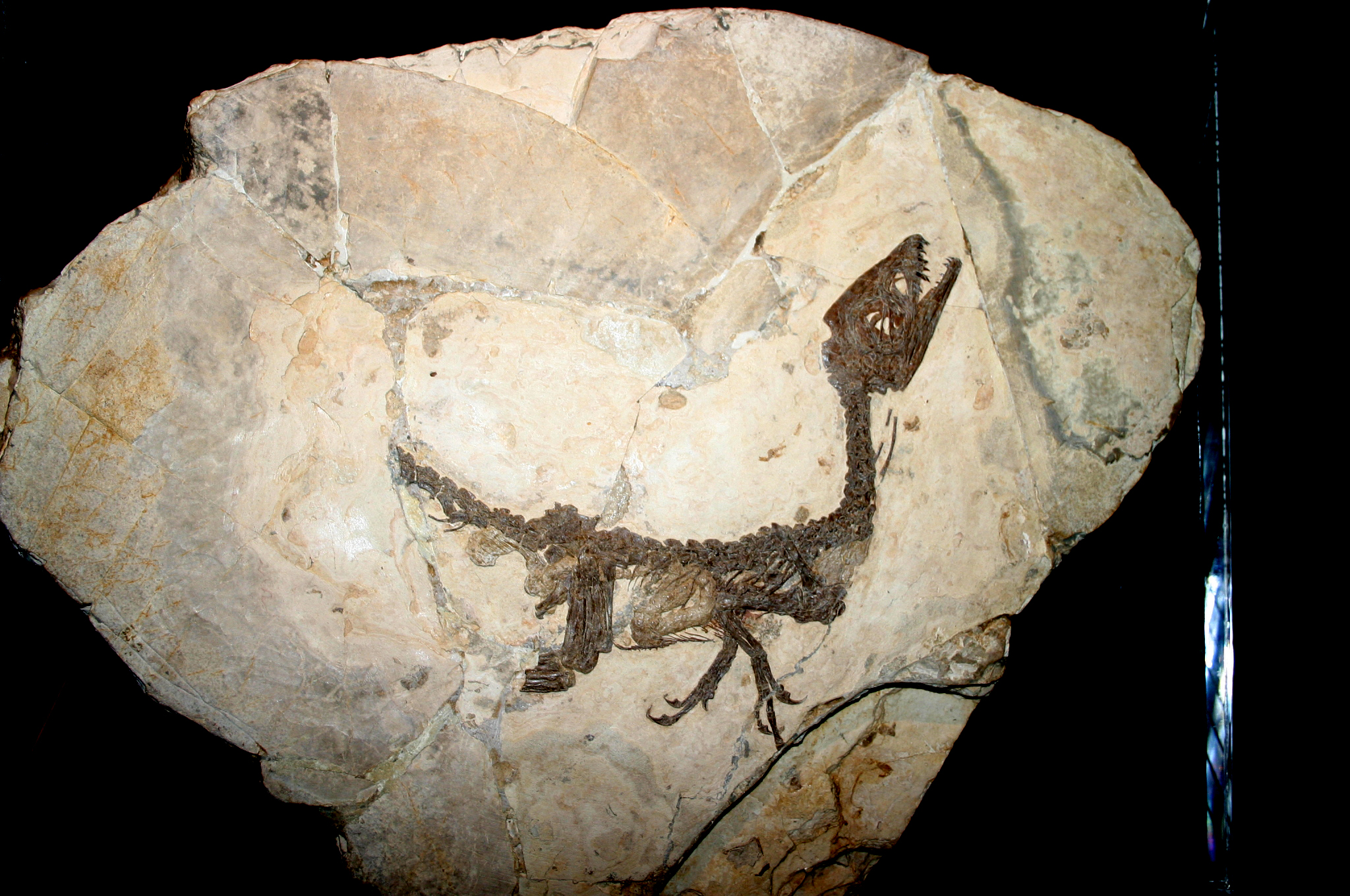
The complete slab; the pieces added by Todesco have not been removed

The vertebral column of Scipionyx probably includes ten cervical vertebrae and thirteen dorsal vertebrae; due to the fact the specimen is just a hatchling, the differentiation between the two categories has not fully developed, making any distinction rather arbitrary. With certainty five sacral vertebrae are present. The fossil has preserved just nine tail vertebrae; likely fifty or more had been originally present. The neck vertebrae are opisthocoelous. The axis is pneumatised as a pneumatopore, an opening through which a diverticulum of the air sack of the neck base could reach its hollow interior, is visible on its side. The third, fourth and fifth vertebrae also show pneumatopores but the consecutive series lacks them, which is surprising as it had been assumed the pneumatisation process would have started at the back, working itself forward. Contrary to what was stated by the 1998 study, the cervical ribs are very elongated, with a length of up to three vertebral centra.

The vertebrae of the back are not pneumatised. They are amphiplatyan with an oval cross-section and bear low spines with a hexagonal profile. Just below the top of the spine on the front and back edge a small beak-shaped process is present. In 1998 interpreted as a reduced hyposphene-hypantrum complex, a system of secondary vertebral joints shown by many theropods, it was by the 2011 study seen as a pair of attachment points for tendons, as identified in 2006 in Compsognathus. Exceptionally, with the thirteenth vertebra the two rib joint processes, the parapophysis and the diapophysis, are positioned at the same level. The five sacral vertebrae have not yet fused into a real sacrum. The tail vertebrae are platycoelous with low spines and backward slanting chevrons.

There are at least twelve pairs of dorsal ribs; some displaced elements might represent a thirteenth pair. The third and fourth rib have expanded lower ends that in life probably were attached to cartilaginous sternal ribs, themselves connected to sterna that in the holotype specimen have not (yet) ossified. The lower rump is covered by a basket of eighteen pairs of gastralia or belly ribs. Mysterious shaft parts present near the forelimbs are by Dal Sasso & Maganuco interpreted as the remains of a nineteenth frontmost element consisting of two completely fused shafts homologous to the normal medial elements of a pair of gastralia; such a chevron-like bone has also been reported with Juravenator. The gastralia form a herringbone pattern, the left and right medial elements overlapping each other at their forked ends in order that the basket can expand and contract to accommodate the breathing movements of the abdomen.

The scapula is relatively straight and about six to seven times longer than wide; its upper end is missing. Its lower end is connected to a semicircular coracoid. The furcula is broad and more or less U-shaped with its two branches angled at 125°. The forelimb is rather long; its length is equal to 48% of the body length in front of the pelvis. Especially the hand is elongated as is typical for compsognathids; for a member of that group Scipionyx has a relatively short hand, however. The humerus is straight with a moderately developed deltopectoral crest. The ulna is slender and cylinder-shaped with a length of 70% of that of the humerus. The wrist consists of two elements only: a radial bone capping the lower end of the radius and a disc-shaped bone below it; this is either the enlarged first lower carpal or a perfect seamless fusion of the first and second lower carpal. The metacarpus is compact and moderately elongated. Its three elements mirror the shape of the fingers they bear: the first is the shortest en thickest; the second the longest; and the third is intermediate in length and thickness. The third finger is exceptionally long for a comspognathid, with 123% of thumb length. As the lower joint of the first metacarpal is bevelled, the thumb diverges medially. Its claw is no larger than that of the second finger. The hand claws are moderately curved.

In the pelvis the ilium is short and flat with a slightly convex upper profile. The back end is rectangular, the front edge has an appending hook-shaped point and near its top a circular notch, a trait that is usually considered a synapomorphy of the Tyrannosauroidea. The pubic bone points almost vertically downwards and is thus "mesopubic" or "orthopubic". It is relatively short with about two thirds of the length of the femur. It has a short "foot" shaped like a golf club. The ischium has three quarters the length of the pubis, set at an angle of 54° to it. It ends in a small expansion. On the front of its shaft a large hatchet-shaped obturator process is present, the attachment for the Musculus puboischiofemoralis externus, that lacks a small circular notch between its lower edge and the shaft, though this lack is normally associated with the possession of a lower triangular processus obturatorius.

Of the hindlimb, the lower leg is missing. The femur or thigh bone is straight and robust. The lesser trochanter is markedly lower than the greater trochanter and separated from it by a narrow cleft. It has the shape of a wing-like expansion to the front. An accessory or posterior trochanter is lacking; likewise a fourth trochanter on the back shaft is absent. The tibia has only a weak cnemial crest, separated from its outer condyle by a deep narrow groove, the incisura tibialis. The fibula is broad on top but has a slender shaft.

=== Soft tissues ===
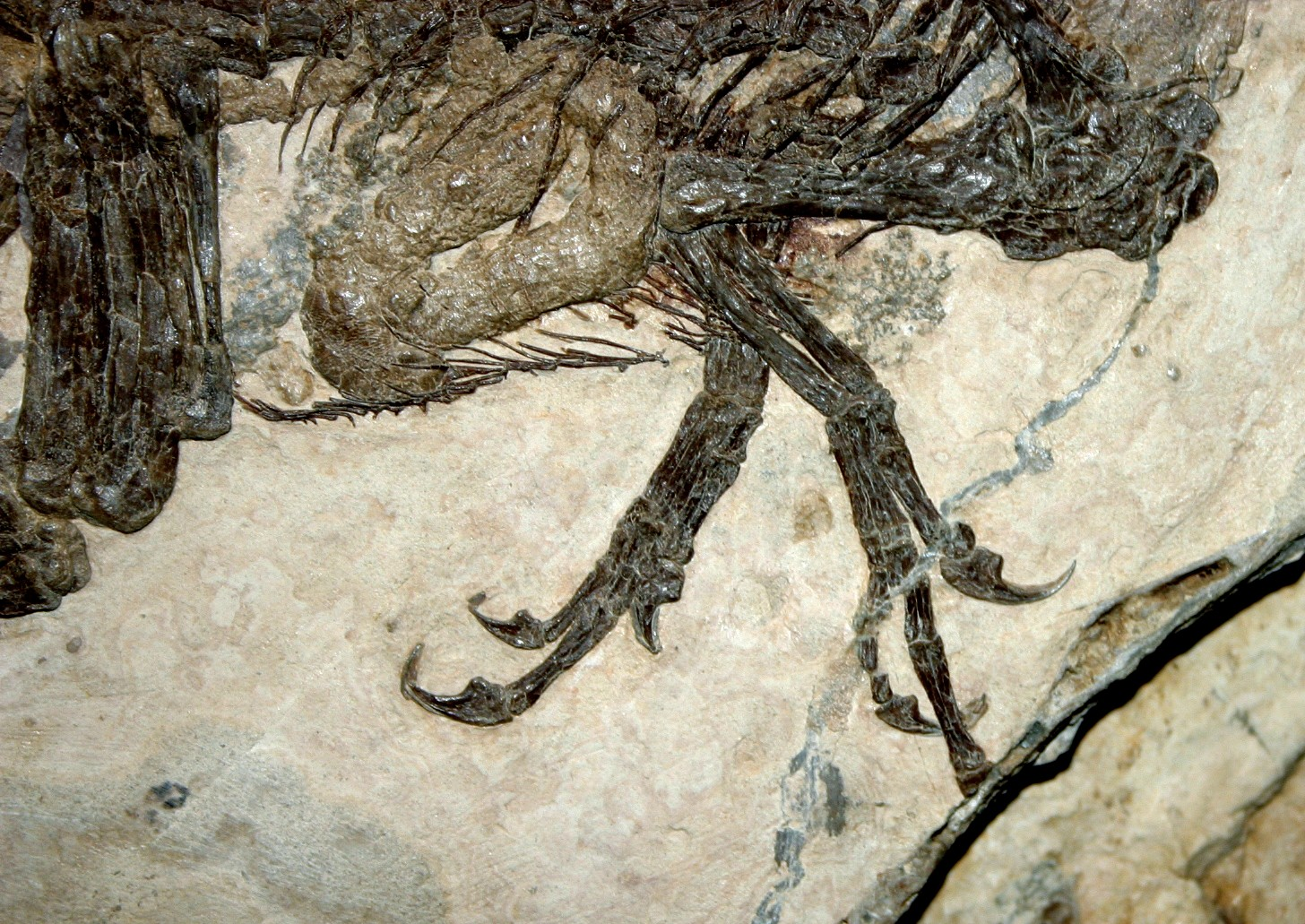
Close up of the front limbs and gut region

The holotype preserves an exceptionally large set of soft tissues for a fossil dinosaur. Although some muscle tissue (Santanaraptor, Pelecanimimus), cartilage (Juravenator, Aucasaurus) or an intestine (Mirischia, Daurlong) have been reported from other dinosaurs, Scipionyx is unique in preserving in some form examples from most major internal organ groups: blood, blood vessels, cartilage, connective tissues, bone tissue, muscle tissue, horn sheaths, the respiratory system and the digestive system. Nervous tissue and the external skin, including possible scales or feathers, are absent.

The soft tissues are not present in the form of imprints but as three-dimensional petrifications, having been replaced by calcium phosphate in amazing detail, even to the subcellular level; or as transformed remains of the original biomolecular components.

==== Bone tissue ====
The original bone tissue is no longer present but the calcium phosphate mineralisation has preserved the structure of original bone cells, showing individual osteocytes including their inner hollow spaces and the canaliculi. Also the internal blood vessels of the bone have been preserved, in some cases still empty inside. On some bones, including some of the skull and lower jaws, the periosteum is still visible.

==== Ligaments and cartilage ====
From the ninth cervical vertebra to the back, the vertebral joints show the remains of articular capsules. Between the spines at places very thin interspinal and supraspinal ligaments are visible. Six vertebrae are visibly capped by cartilaginous synchondroses, a typical juvenile feature. Cartilaginous caps are also present on all limb joints, even the smallest, and are especially thick in the shoulder, elbow and wrist joints. Also the pubic foot is capped and the ilium and pubic bone are separated by cartilage.

==== Respiratory system ====
Of the respiratory system little has been preserved. No traces of the lungs have survived, nor of any air sacks. The sole element still present consists of a seven millimetre long piece of the trachea of which about ten tracheal rings are visible, the most anterior of which are open at the top, giving them a C-shape. They have an average length of 0.33 millimetres and are separated by 0.17 millimetre thick interspaces. The trachea is quite thin, with a preserved width of one millimetre about half as wide as would be expected for an animal the size of the holotype, and positioned rather low in the neck base, embedded in connective tissue.

==== Liver, heart, spleen and thymus ====
In the front part of the thorax a conspicuous red halo is visible, forming a roughly circular stain with a diameter of seventeen millimetres. In 1998 it was suggested this might represent the remains of the decayed liver, a blood-rich organ. That the red pigment was indeed derived from blood, was confirmed in 2011: a scanning electron microscope analysis indicated that the substance consisted of limonite, hydrated iron oxide, a likely transformation product of the original haemoglobin. Also biliverdine was present, a bile component expected in the liver. The blood might also partly have originated from the heart and the spleen, two similarly blood-rich organs, with reptiles positioned between the two lobes of the liver.

Another organ in the thorax, traces of which might be present, is the thymus, which might have contributed to a greyish mass of organic origin visible in the neck base; this also contains connective and muscle tissue.

==== Digestive system ====
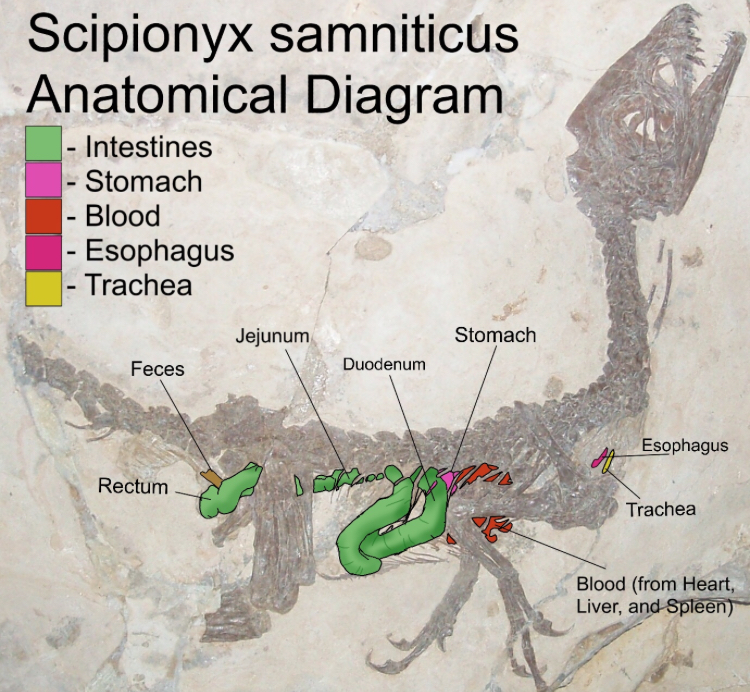
A diagram showing the organs preserved in the Scipionyx holotype

The digestive tract can mostly be traced, either because the intestines are still present or by the presence of food items. The position of the oesophagus is indicated by a five millimetre long series of small food particles. Below the ninth dorsal vertebra the location of the stomach is shown by a cluster of bones of prey animals, the organ itself likely having been dissolved by its own stomach acid shortly after death. The rather backward position of the cluster suggests the stomach was dual in structure, with a forward enzyme-secreting proventriculus preceding a muscular gizzard. Gastroliths have not been reported.

Just behind the presumed position of the stomach a very conspicuous large and thick intestine is visible, that has been identified as the duodenum. It is preserved partly in the form of a natural endocast, partly as a petrification still showing the cellular structure, including the mucosa and connective tissue. Some mesenteric blood vessels cover the intestine in the form of up to a centimetre long and 0.02 to 0.1 millimetre wide hollow tubes. The duodenum forms a large loop, the descending part of which first is directed downwards towards the gastralia and then runs to the back. There in a sharp bend, the folds of which are clearly visible, it turns to the front, proceeding as an ascending tract, its visible part ending near the stomach. At this point the tract is directed to the left of the body, perpendicular to the fossil slab, and its course can thus no longer be followed. Nearby and slightly above, a subsequent intestine part surfaces that has been interpreted as the jejunum. This thinner intestine turns to the back, running parallel to the ascending tract of the duodenum and ultimately disappearing under it, at the level of the twelfth dorsal vertebra. Apparently a loop to the front is made because it resurfaces below the tenth dorsal vertebra, first running upwards and then turning to the back below the hind vertebral column — or at places even over it: probably after death its position partly shifted upwards. The jejunum seems to blend with an exceptionally short ileum. A contraction below the thirteenth dorsal vertebra might indicate the transition to the rectum. A caecum seems absent. The rectum runs to the back between the upper shafts of the pubes and ischia. Then it bends downwards parallel to the ischium shaft, at the end of it turning upwards again. In this final part faeces are still present. The cloaca is lacking. Dal Sasso & Maganuco suggested the cloaca exit was rather low, at the level of the ischial feet and that a rectocoprodaeal valve separated faeces and urine.

Between the front edge of the pubic shafts and the back of the intestines a large empty space is present. Also, the rectum seems to run in a very high position as if it were forced upwards by something. According to Dal Sasso & Maganuco, in life this space would have been filled by the yolk sac of the hatchling; on hatching the juveniles of reptiles typically have not absorbed all the yolk and use the residual nutrients to supplement the food intake during their first weeks.

==== Muscle tissue ====
At several places on the fossil muscle tissue is present. The degree of preservation is often exceptional, with not only the individual fibres still discernible but also the individual cells and even the subcellular sarcomeres. Among dinosaur fossils such sarcomeres are only known from Santanaraptor, whose muscle fibres are four times as thick. The original organic material has been replaced by small hollow globes, the walls of which consist of euhedric crystals of apatite.

In the grey organic mass at the neck base, muscle fibres are present that have been identified as belonging to the Musculus sternohyoideus and the Musculus sternotrachealis. Between the sixth and seventh dorsal vertebra a patch of muscle fibres is visible belonging to either the Musculus transversospinalis or the Musculus longissimus dorsi. In front of the right ischium muscle fibres are present running from the ischial foot in the direction of the femur. Their identity is uncertain: they could belong to the Musculus puboischiofemoralis pars medialis (the Musculus adductor femoris I of crocodiles) but in that case this muscle with (some) non-avian theropods would not be anchored on the obturator process. The fibres could also represent an unknown muscle. In any case they refute a conjecture by Gregory S. Paul that there would be no muscle connection between the ischium and the femur at all. Above the rectum tract a large area of horizontal unsegmented muscle fibres is present, probably representing the unsegmented Musculus caudofemoralis longus of the tail base, the main retractor muscle operating on the thighbone. These fibres are polygonal in cross-section and show the intercellular spaces also. Below some tail base vertebrae the connective ligaments between the chevrons are present, forming the ligmamentum interhaemale, but also some small muscle fibres and some mysterious hollow tubes arranged in a herringbone pattern; the latter perhaps represent the myosepta of the myotomes, the segments of the Musculus iliocaudalis or the Musculus ischiocaudalis.

==== Horn sheaths ====
On all claws preserved in the fossil — those of the feet have all been lost — horn sheaths are visible. These have a darker colouration on top than on the bottom which suggests that the original horn material is still present — but this has not yet been directly tested by a chemical analysis for fear of damaging these delicate structures that were seen as forming an essential part of the integrity of the precious specimen. The horn sheaths of the hand claws extend the bony cores by about 40%, scythe-like continuing the bone curve and ending in sharp points. On some claws the sheaths have partly detached; on others they have been flattened or split.

==== Integument ====
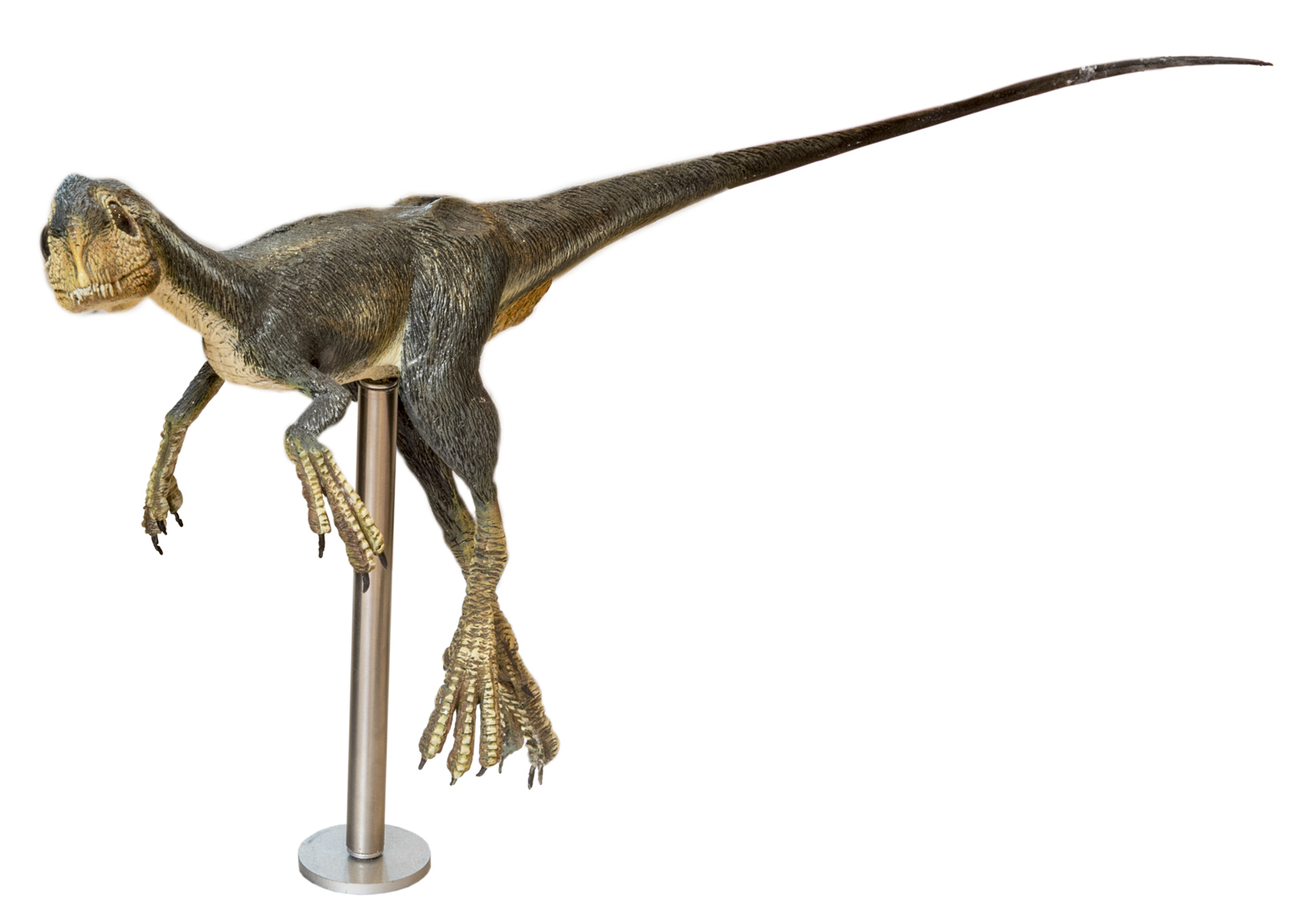
Museum exhibition

The fossil preserves no traces of any skin, scales or feathers. In 1999 Philip J. Currie hypothesised this might be otherwise, suggesting the tubes found on the tail base would represent the filaments of protofeathers. In 2011, however, Dal Sasso & Maganuco rejected this interpretation because the tubes taper at both ends, while integument filaments are expected to have only a tapered top end. Nevertheless, they considered it likely that Scipionyx in life had protofeathers as these are known to be present with the compsognathids Sinosauropteryx and Sinocalliopteryx.

== Phylogeny ==
Scipionyx was by the describers assigned to the Coelurosauria, a group of theropods. Because the only remains recovered belong to that of a juvenile, it has proven difficult to assign this dinosaur to a more specific group. One problem is that in the build of a juvenile animal the original traits of ancestor groups are more likely to be expressed, suggesting a too basal position in the evolutionary tree. Part of the 2011 monograph was a cladistic analysis which indicated that Scipionyx was a basal member of the Compsognathidae and the sister species of Orkoraptor. Dal Sasso & Maganuco emphasised that, due to its limited remains, the position of Orkoraptor is tentative.

This cladogram shows the position of Scipionyx in the coelurosaurian tree, according to the 2011 study:

- **Tyrannoraptora**
  - Tyrannosauroidea
  - - Compsognathidae
      - - **Scipionyx**
        - Orkoraptor
      - - Sinocalliopteryx
        - - Compsognathus
          - - Huaxiagnathus
            - - Sinosauropteryx
              - Juravenator
    - Maniraptoriformes

In 2021, a study proposed by Andrea Cau re-evaluated the classification of this specimen and the classification of compsognathids in general. According to Cau's study, compsognathids would be a "false clade" (a polyphyletic assemblage) and most of the ascribed genera would actually represent juvenile forms or chicks of other tetanuran theropod clades, stating that the same characteristics used to differentiate the group from other families of theropods, are actually the typical characteristics of the chicks of the large basal tetanurae. In his study, Cau proposes a new procedure to classify these animals, applying it to Juravenator, Scipionyx and Sciurumimus, obtaining a possible phylogenetic position that was not affected by the immaturity of the specimens. According to this new procedure, Juravenator and Sciurumimus turn out to be megalosauroids, while Scipionyx turns out to be a carcharodontosaurid. This interpretation would also be supported by the similarity of the jaw of Scipionyx with that of an Allosaurus chick. Furthermore, this location would explain the size discrepancy between the Scipionyx type specimen and the estimated adult size for the presumed adult compsognathids, more in line with the size of the large carcharodontosaurids. An abbreviated version of the phylogeny recovered by Cau is shown below with putative compognathids in bold.

- Tetanurae
  - Coelurosauria
    - Ornitholestes
    - **Compsognathus**
    - - Haplocheirus
      - - Coelurus
        - Guanlong
  - Carnosauria
    - Allosauroidea
      - Monolophosaurus
      - - Sinraptor
        - - Allosaurus
          - - Neovenator
            - - Acrocanthosaurus
              - Concavenator
              - **Scipionyx**
    - Megalosauroidea
      - - Marshosaurus
        - - Asfaltovenator
          - **Sciurumimus**
      - - Piatnitzkysaurus
        - - Spinosauridae
          - - Afrovenator
            - - - Megalosaurus
                - Torvosaurus
              - - Duriavenator
                - - Wiehenvenator
                  - - - Dubreuillosaurus
                      - **Juravenator**
                    - - Eustreptospondylus
                      - Magnosaurus

Here is a simplified version of Cau (2024), with Scipionyx in bold.

- Tetanurae
  - - Siamraptor
    - Siamotyrannus
  - Orionides
    - - Streptospondylus
      - Xuanhanosaurus
      - Poekilopleuron
      - Piveteausaurus
      - Piatnitzkysaurus
      - Marshosaurus
      - Leshansaurus
      - Eustreptospondylus
      - Condorraptor
      - Asfaltovenator
      - - Sciurumimus
        - Nedcolbertia
        - Magnosaurus
        - Duriavenator
        - Afrovenator
        - - Compsognathus longipes
          - Compsognathus corallestris
          - Torvosaurus tanneri
          - Torvosaurus gurneyi
          - Megalosaurus
          - - **Scipionyx**
            - Wiehenvenator
            - Iberospinus
            - - Baryonychinae
              - Spinosaurinae
    - Avetheropoda
      - Allosauroidea (Incl. Juravenator at an indeterminate position)
      - Coelurosauria
        - Sinosauropteryx
        - Sinocalliopteryx
        - Mirischia
        - Huaxiagnathus
        - Zuolong
        - Tyrannoraptora
          - Maniraptoromorpha
          - - NGMC 2124
            - Tanycolagreus
            - Stokesosaurus
            - Juratyrant
            - Eutyrannosauria

== Paleobiology ==
=== Habitat ===
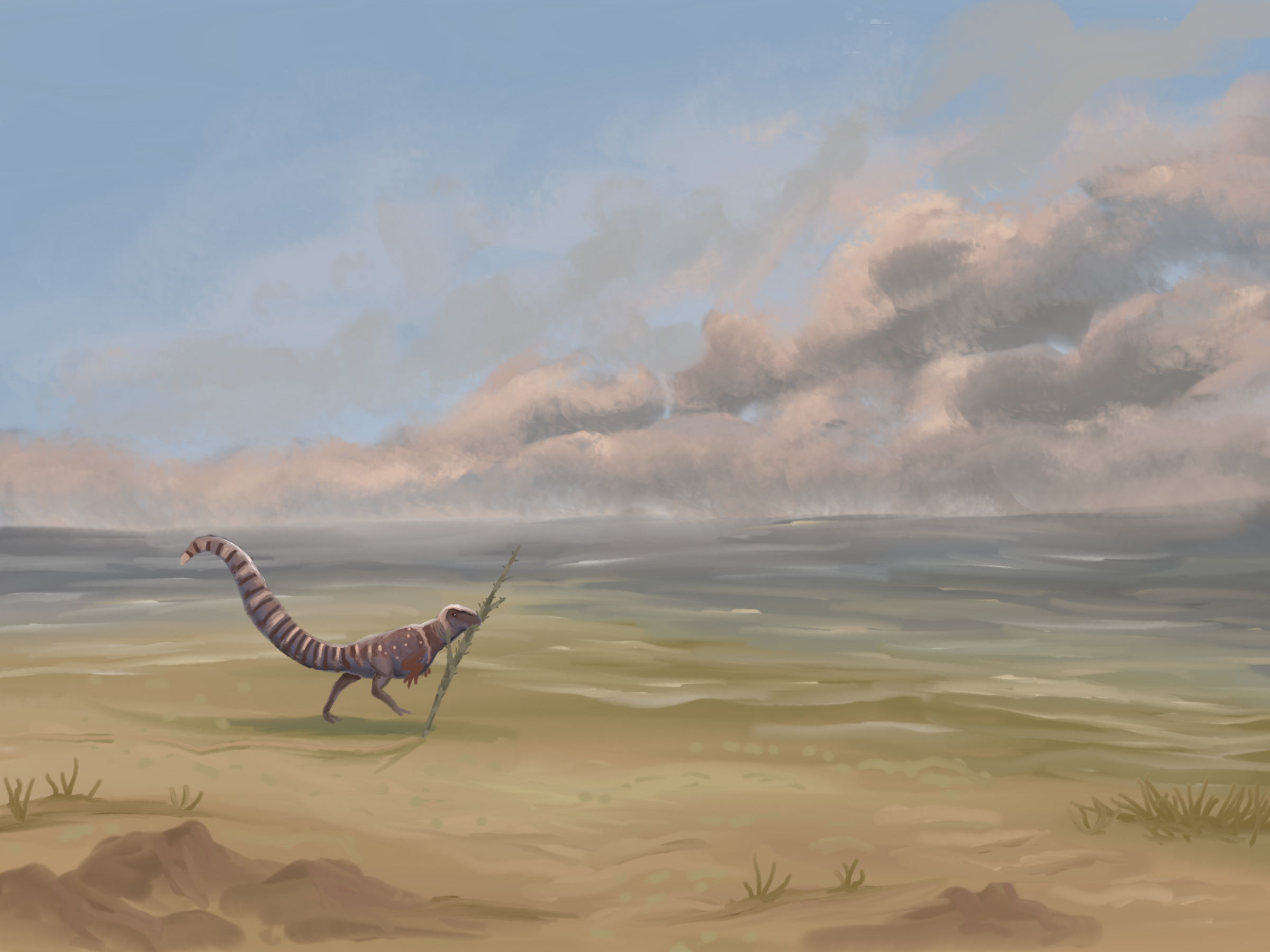
A restoration of a Scipionyx playing with a stick on a beach

The location where Scipionyx was found, in the Albian was part of the Apulian Plate, at the time largely covered by the shallow Paratethys. Some dry land was present however, but it is uncertain how extensive or connected the several terranes were. The marine sediments of the Pietraroja Plattenkalk were probably deposited closely to a piece of the Apennine Platform, which piece possibly formed a small island between the present middle of Italy and Tunisia. From this it has been concluded that the habitat of Scipionyx in general consisted of small islands and it represented one of the larger animals of its ecosystem.

However, there are also indications that the terranes regularly interconnected to form far more extensive islands, land bridges allowing a dispersal of much larger animals, such as sauropods and large theropods. If so, they were not present for long when the land surface fragmented again, because there are no signs of insular dwarfism, a size reduction as an adaptation to decreased resources. Likewise, Scipionyx itself is no dwarf among its relatives. Due to its small absolute size, Scipionyx would have been able to maintain itself when the dry land shrank. Nevertheless, Dal Sasso & Maganuco did not consider Scipionyx to have been a permanent resident of small islands throughout tens of millions of years, but more likely a recent immigrant arriving during a dispersal wave, probably from North-Africa. They admitted this was at odds with their own phylogenetic analysis, showing Scipionyx to be a basal compsognathid, but they pointed out that the phylogeny found was uncertain due to the juvenile status of the fossil.

Land animals actually found in the Pietraroja deposits are all small. They include the lizards Chometokadmon and Eichstaettisaurus gouldi, a relative of the forty million years older German Eichstaettisaurus schroederi; the rhynchocephalian Derasmosaurus and the amphibian Celtedens megacephalus.

=== Food ===
The fossil provides direct information about the diet of Scipionyx because remains of a complete series of consecutive meals have been preserved, perhaps everything the animal ate during its short life. These confirm what already could be concluded from its phylogenetic affinities and general build: that Scipionyx was a predator.

In the oesophagus tract about eight scales and some bone fragments are present. Dal Sasso & Maganuco considered it likely that these had not been swallowed as loose elements but were the remains of a meal, partly regurgitated from the stomach in the final death throes. In the stomach position itself, a cluster of small bones is visible. These include an ankle with a three millimetre wide metatarsus consisting of five metatarsals attached, a tail vertebra and the upper end of an ulna. If the remains represent a single prey animal, it is likely either a member of the Mesoeucrocodylia or some lepidosaurian lizard-like animal; the size indicates the last possibility. In the descending tract of the duodenum two clusters of lizard scales are present and, more below, a fish vertebra. The jejunum shows a cluster of dozens of fish vertebrae, likely having belonged to a member of the Clupeomorpha. A second cluster of vertebrae was found at the jejunum-ileum boundary. The final tract of the rectum still holds faeces in which a piece of skin is visible showing seventeen scales of a fish of the Osteoglossiformes that was nine seasons old, judging from the growth lines on the scales.

The food items found allow to reconstruct a sequence of food intakes: first a four to five centimetres long fish; secondly a smaller fish of two to three centimetres; next a ten to twelve centimetres long lizard; then a fifteen to forty, depending on the identification, centimetres long lepidosaurian lizard; and finally some indeterminate vertebrate(s). Together they represent a varied diet showing that Scipionyx was an opportunistic generalist. That swift lizards had been caught and sea fish washed ashore had been gathered necessitating a prolonged patrolling of the flood line, both indicate a good mobility. If the prey animal in the stomach really was forty centimetres long, it is highly unlikely that the equally-sized hatchling had been able to subdue it, indicating parental care.

=== Physiology ===
Scipionyx is considered one of the most important fossil vertebrates ever discovered, after a long and painstaking "autopsy" revealed the unique fossilisation of portions of its internal organs. It is believed Scipionyx lived in a region filled with shallow lagoons. These bodies of water were oxygen deficient, leading to the well-preserved Scipionyx specimen, much like the fine fossil preservation seen in Germany's Archaeopteryx. Parts of the windpipe, intestines, liver, blood vessels, cartilage, horn sheaths, tendons and muscles were fossilised in the fine limestone in a way unlike any dinosaur fossil previously discovered. The specimen's liver was preserved in the form of a red hematite halo retaining the shape it had when the animal was alive. The find has great importance because the relative positions of internal organs of dinosaurs could only be guessed at before this discovery. The holotype specimen thus provides unique direct information about the physiology of non-avian dinosaurs, especially regarding the digestion, the respiration and the ontogenesis.

==== Digestion ====
The digestive tract of Scipionyx is generally short but wide. The overall length of the intestines — shorter than what was expected — indicates Scipionyx could process food very efficiently. The efficiency would be improved by the visible intestine folds, the plicae circulares, enlarging the absorption surface. Dal Sasso & Maganuco emphasised that a short tract does not necessarily imply that the processing time was short too; retention could have been prolonged to optimise digestion. Most extant vertebrate predators are capable of extracting about 75% of the energetic value of the prey flesh.

The bones in the stomach region had not been etched by the stomach acid, indicating this meal was less than a day old. It is possible that the stomach exit was too narrow to let these remains pass and that the acid was used to extract calcium from the bones, a much-needed nutrient for a young growing animal. The subsequent digestive tract with most extant vertebrates is incapable of further digesting bones. Afterwards the remains would then have been regurgitated. However, the presence of vertebrae in the intestines suggests that the exit was wide and that non-avian theropods in this respect were more like present Lepidosauromorpha than extant Archosauria who regurgitate. This is also confirmed by a high bone content in the coprolites of large theropods. Fish contains much calcium and it is possible that the hatchling instinctively sought it out; alternatively, it could have been preferentially fed fish by its parents. The presence of skin in the faeces was to be expected as this is not easily digested.

The body parts of the large lepidosaurian in the stomach had been made more digestible by biting them into pieces. According to Dal Sasso & Maganuco the hatchling would certainly have been incapable of achieving this and they considered it a strong indication of parental care as it was improbable the animal had by chance encountered a carcass neatly ripped apart into easily swallowed bits by predators or scavengers.

==== Respiration ====
Although most of the respiratory system has not been preserved, some far-reaching conclusions have been drawn from the indirect evidence available. In 1999 John Ruben e.a. inferred that Scipionyx had a respiratory system different from birds, and more similar to crocodiles, based on an analysis of pictures of the fossil which seemed to indicate the presence of a diaphragm. The large liver would have completely divided the body cavity into an anterior section for the heart and lungs and a posterior section for the intestines. This would have indicated the presence of septate lungs, ventilated by a hepatic-piston diaphragm, driven by the liver and a Musculus diaphragmaticus, which in the fossil was visibly attached to the pubes. Such a system would be an argument against the idea that birds, whose lungs are ventilated by air-sacs, are coelurosaurian theropods, and an indication theropods were cold-blooded.

John Ruben's conclusions have, however, been questioned by some scientists, such as Lawrence Witmer, who claimed the study to be flawed. The 2011 study concluded that due to the fact that the liver had been preserved as a vague halo, representing body fluids that after death might have covered a larger surface than the organs they originated from, its exact dimensions and extent cannot be determined. In any case a diaphragm itself or its position could not be directly observed. Many bird livers are large too, showing that such a trait is compatible with an air-sac system. The small body cavity in front of the halo seemed to indicate the presence of small stiff bird-like lungs. The presumed M. diaphragmaticus was shown to be an artifact caused by the polishing and engraving of calcite nodules of non-organic origin during preparation, creating the illusion of muscle fibres.

The empty space between the pubic bones and the intestines has by G.S. Paul and David Martill been hypothesised to have been the location of a large air-sac. Dal Sasso & Maganuco however, rejected this interpretation because with living birds the air-sac of the posterior abdomen does not force the intestines forwards. They considered the space more likely to have been filled by a large yolk-sac. Air-sacs were nevertheless probable given the pneumatisation of the vertebrae. Vertebrae without pneumatopores would have indicated the boundaries between three air-sac systems: those of the neck base, the lungs, and the abdomen. The double rib heads would indicate a rather stiff thorax, ventilated by the gastralia. A system of hook-like uncinate processes on the ribs as with the Maniraptoriformes, allowing the ribcage to move flexibly, in articulation with an ossified sternum, was absent in Scipionyx.

==== Growth ====
The holotype of Scipionyx is a rare example of a non-avian theropod hatchling; the most important other very young specimens are the chicks of Byronosaurus that however are much less complete. The young age is reflected by the proportions and the low degree of ossification and fusion of several skeletal elements. The most obvious youthful trait is the relatively large and short head.

Dal Sasso & Maganuco have tried to determine the absolute age of the hatchling. The fact that the fontanelle had not closed yet, poses an upper age limit of about five weeks. An even lower limit is indicated by the lack of any tooth replacement, which with Archosauria begins after a few weeks at the latest. The most exact age is given by the size of the yolk sac, which indicates a probable age of three days, with an upper limit of a week. Despite its very young age, the hatchling was able to walk, as is shown by the complete ossification of the ilium. However, this does not imply Scipionyx was precocial as even with altricial birds this pelvis bone fully ossifies within a few days after hatching.
