= Cristiano Dal Sasso =

Italian paleontologist (born 1965)

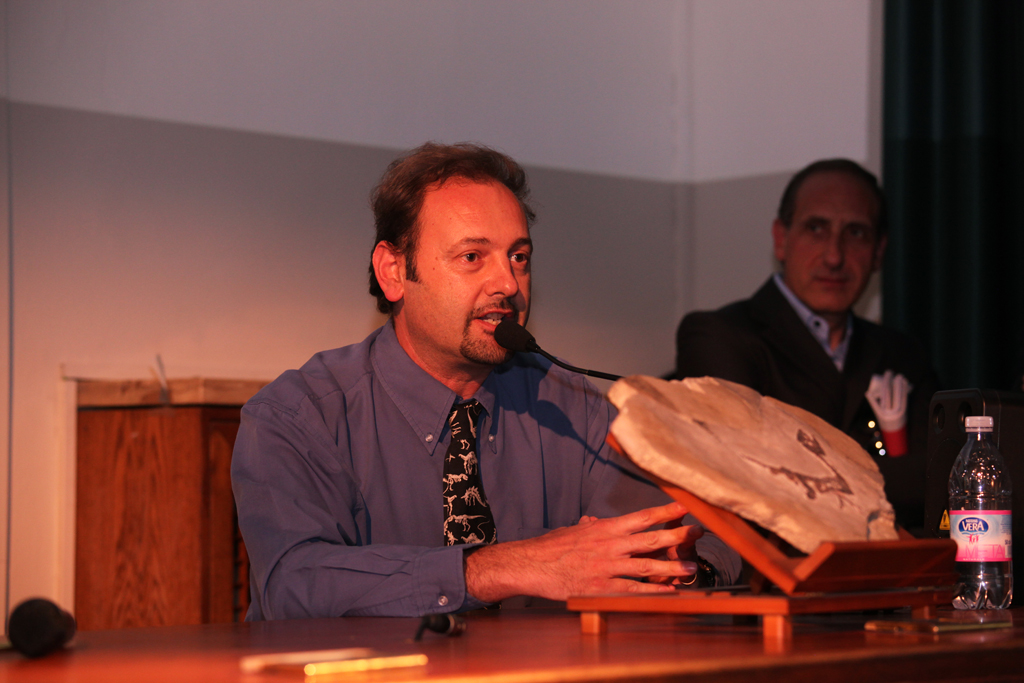
- Born: September 12, 1965 (age 60); Monza, Italy
- Education: University of Milano-Bicocca
- Occupations: Scientific popularizer Paleontologist

Cristiano Dal Sasso (born 12 September 1965) is an Italian paleontologist. He is known for having participated in the description of notable sauropsids such as the ichthyosaur Besanosaurus and the theropod dinosaurs Scipionyx and Saltriovenator.

== Biography ==
He was born in Monza, Italy and has been working since 1991 for the Milan Natural History Museum where he is the curator of fossil reptiles and birds. He was the technical coordinator of the excavations of Besano, which brought to light the complete skeleton of a Middle Triassic marine reptile of the order of Ichthyosauria, the Besanosaurus with embryos in the belly, published in 1996 along with Giovanni Pinna.

He studied Scipionyx, the first dinosaur found in Italy at Pietraroja, whose description appeared in Nature in 1998. This small theropod dinosaur, nicknamed "Ciro", generated much publicity because of the unique preservation of large areas of petrified soft tissue and internal organs such as muscles and intestines. The fossil shows many details of these, even the internal structure of some muscle and bone cells.

In 2018, Dal Sasso, Simone Maganuco and Andrea Cau described Saltriovenator, considered as the earliest known Ceratosauria and largest Early Jurassic theropod, discovered in 1996 in a quarry in Saltrio, in northern Italy.

== Bibliography ==
- Dal Sasso, Cristiano (2004). Dinosaurs of Italy. Bloomington, Indiana: Indiana University Press. ISBN 978-0-253-34514-1.
