= MYOT =

Mammalian protein found in Homo sapiens

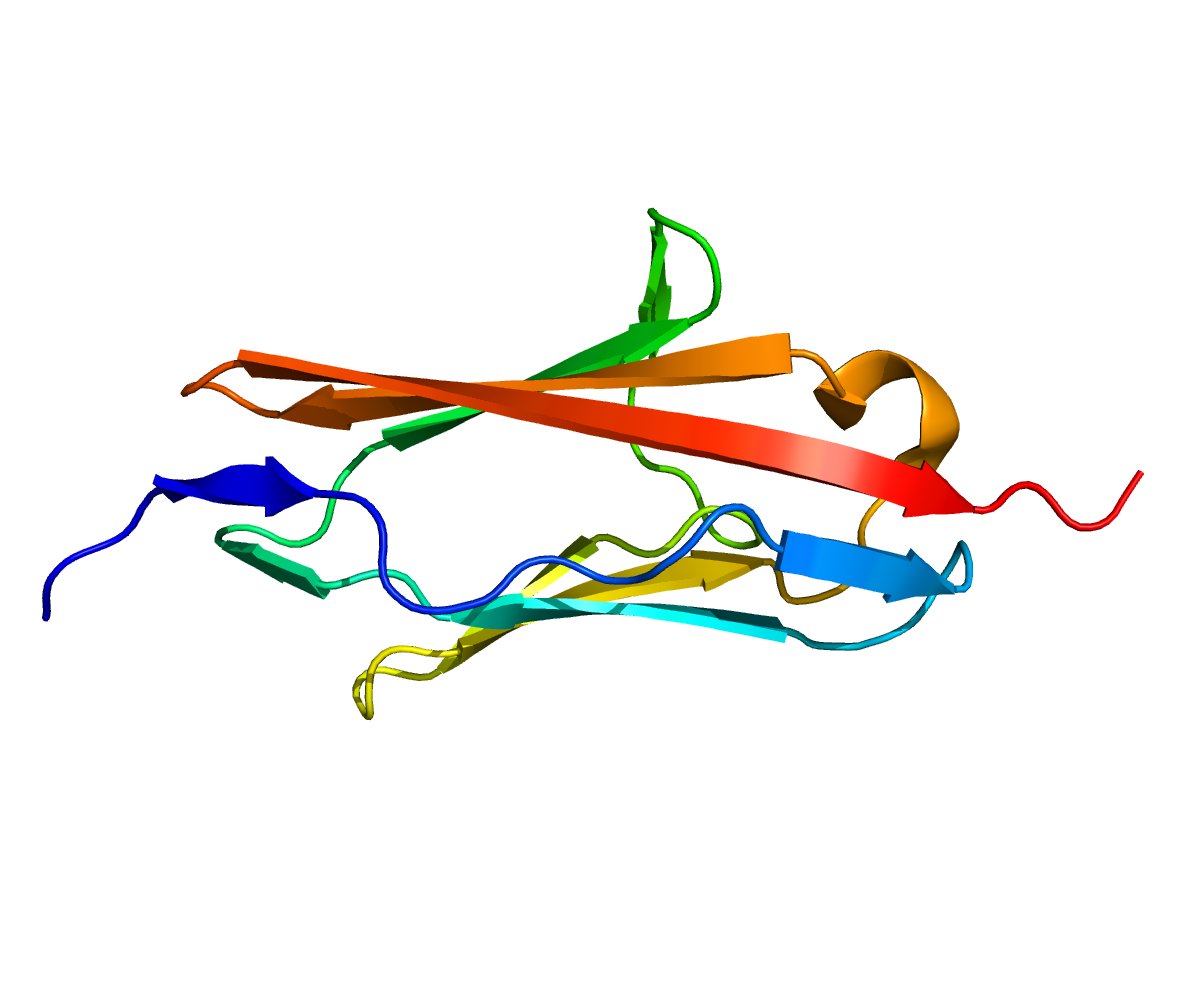

Identifiers
- Aliases: MYOT, LGMD1, LGMD1A, MFM3, TTID, TTOD, myotilin
- External IDs: OMIM: 604103; MGI: 1889800; GeneCards: MYOT
Available structures
PDB	Ortholog search: PDBe RCSB
PDB	List of PDB id codes 2KDG, 2KKQ

Gene location (Human)
Chr.	Chromosome 5 (human)
Band	5q31.2	Start	137,867,858 bp
Band	5q31.2	End	137,887,851 bp

Gene location (Mouse)
Chr.	Chromosome 18 (mouse)
Band	18|18 B3	Start	44,467,141 bp
Band	18|18 B3	End	44,488,791 bp
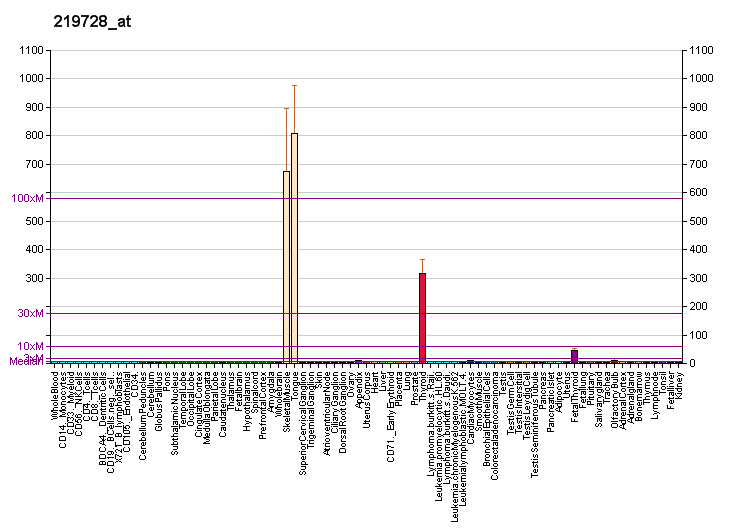
RNA expression pattern
Bgee	Human / Mouse (ortholog); Top expressed in: muscle of thigh; gastrocnemius muscle; Skeletal muscle tissue of rectus abdominis; Skeletal muscle tissue of biceps brachii; vastus lateralis muscle; body of tongue; buccal mucosa cell; Achilles tendon; deltoid muscle; testicle / Top expressed in: digastric muscle; temporal muscle; soleus muscle; triceps brachii muscle; sternocleidomastoid muscle; muscle of thigh; ankle; vastus lateralis muscle; intercostal muscle; thoracic diaphragm; More reference expression data
BioGPS	More reference expression data
Gene ontology
Molecular function	actin binding; structural constituent of muscle; protein binding; alpha-actinin binding; axon guidance receptor activity
Cellular component	cytoplasm; sarcolemma; plasma membrane; Z discdkac; cytoskeleton; membrane; actin cytoskeleton; axon; soma
Biological process	muscle contraction; homophilic cell adhesion via plasma membrane adhesion molecules; axon guidance; synapse organization
Sources:Amigo / QuickGO
Orthologs
Databases	NCBI: entry; OMA: entry
Species	Human	Mouse
Entrez	9499	58916
Ensembl	ENSG00000120729	ENSMUSG00000024471
UniProt	Q9UBF9	Q9JIF9
RefSeq (mRNA)	NM_006790; NM_001135940; NM_001300911	NM_001033621
RefSeq (protein)	NP_001129412; NP_001287840; NP_006781	NP_001028793
Location (UCSC)	Chr 5: 137.87 – 137.89 Mb	Chr 18: 44.47 – 44.49 Mb
PubMed search
- Wikidata
View/Edit Human	View/Edit Mouse

Myotilin is a protein that in humans is encoded by the MYOT gene. Myotilin (myofibrillar titin-like protein) also known as TTID (TiTin Immunoglobulin Domain) is a muscle protein that is found within the Z-disc of sarcomeres.

== Structure ==
Myotilin is a 55.3 kDa protein composed of 496 amino acids. Myotilin was originally identified as a novel alpha-actinin binding partner with two Ig-like domains, that localized to the Z-disc. The I-type Ig-like domains reside at the C-terminal half, and are most homologous to Ig domains 2-3 of palladin and Ig domains 4-5 of myopalladin and more distantly related to Z-disc Ig domains 7 and 8 of titin. The C-terminal region hosts the binding sites for Z-band proteins, and 2 Ig domains are the site of homodimerization for myotilin. By contrast, the N-terminal part of myotilin is unique, consisting of a serine-rich region with no homology to known proteins. Several disease-associated mutations involve serine residues within the serine-rich domain. Myotilin expression in human tissues is mainly restricted to striated muscles and nerves. In muscles, myotilin is predominantly found within the Z-discs. Myotilin forms homodimers and binds alpha-actinin, actin, Filamin C, FATZ-1, FATZ-2 and ZASP.

== Function ==
Myotilin is a structural protein that, along with titin and alpha-actinin give structural integrity to sarcomeres at Z-discs in striated muscle. Myotilin induces the formation of actin bundles in vitro and in non-muscle cells. A ternary complex myotilin/actin/alpha-actinin can be observed in vitro and actin bundles formed under these conditions appear more tightly packed than those induced by alpha-actinin alone. It was demonstrated that myotilin stabilizes F-actin by slowing down the disassembly rate. Ectopic overexpression of truncated myotilin causes the disruption of nascent myofibrils and the co-accumulation of myotilin and titin in amorphous cytoplasmic precipitates. In mature sarcomeres, wild-type myotilin colocalizes with alpha-actinin and Z-disc titin, showing the striated pattern typical of sarcomeric proteins. Targeted disruption of the myotilin gene in mice does not cause significant alterations in muscle function. On the other hand, transgenic mice with mutated myotilin develop muscle dystrophy.

== Clinical significance ==
Myotilin is mutated in various forms of muscular dystrophy: Limb-Girdle Muscular Dystrophy type 1A (LGMD1A), Myofibrillar Myopathy (MFM), Spheroid Body Myopathy and Distal Myopath. The mechanism underlying the pathology is still under investigation. It has been shown that actin binding properties of myotilin housing pathogenic mutations (Ser55Phe, Thr57Ile, Ser60Cys, and Ser95Ile) are normal, albeit with a slower rate of degradation. Surprisingly, YFP-fusion constructs of myotilin mutants (Ser55Phe, Ser55Ile, Thr57Ile, Ser60Cys, Ser60Phe, Ser95Ile, Arg405Lys) localized normally to Z-discs and exhibited normal dynamics in muscle cells.
