= MYOZ2 =

Protein-coding gene in the species Homo sapiens

Identifiers
- Aliases: MYOZ2, C4orf5, CMH16, CS-1, myozenin 2, FATZ-2
- External IDs: OMIM: 605602; MGI: 1913063; GeneCards: MYOZ2

Gene location (Human)
| Chr. | Chromosome 4 (human) |
| Band | 4q26 | Start | 119,135,832 bp |
| Band | 4q26 | End | 119,187,789 bp |

Gene location (Mouse)
| Chr. | Chromosome 3 (mouse) |
| Band | 3|3 G1 | Start | 122,799,855 bp |
| Band | 3|3 G1 | End | 122,828,664 bp |
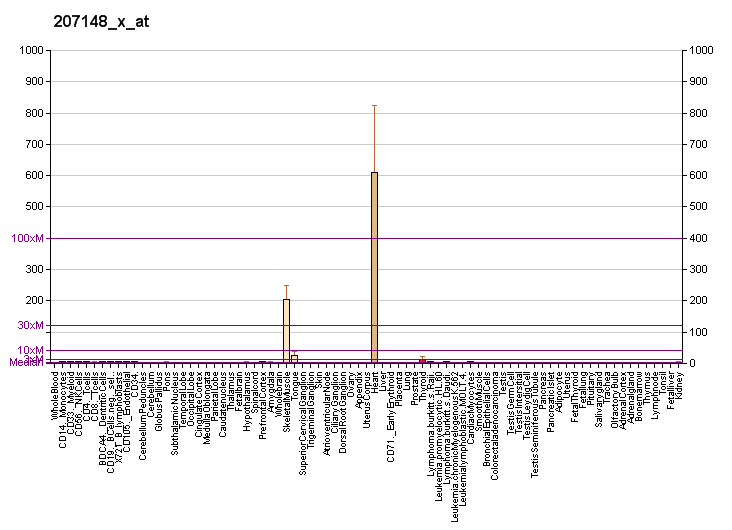

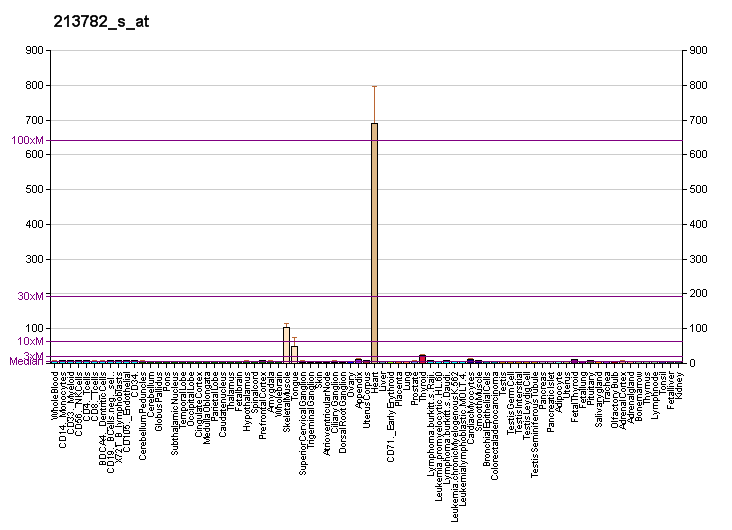

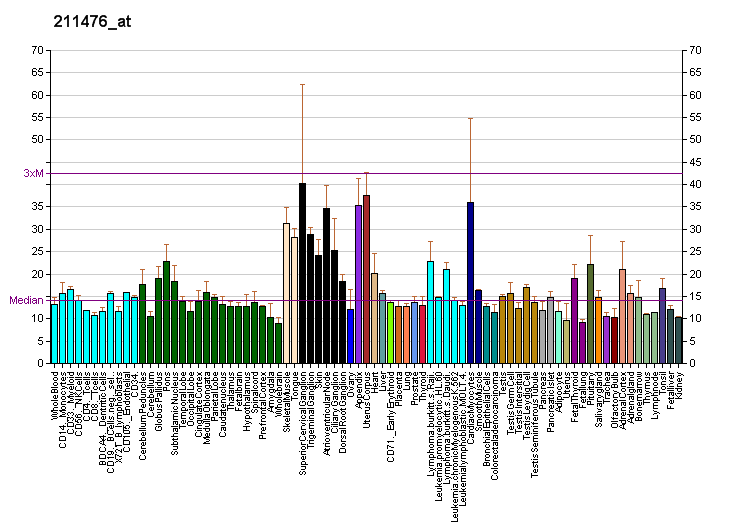
RNA expression pattern
| Bgee | Human / Mouse (ortholog); Top expressed in: right ventricle; myocardium of left ventricle; cardiac muscle tissue of right atrium; thoracic diaphragm; glutes; vena cava; biceps brachii; Skeletal muscle tissue of biceps brachii; Skeletal muscle tissue of rectus abdominis; right auricle of heart / Top expressed in: interventricular septum; soleus muscle; myocardium of ventricle; cardiac muscles; right ventricle; intercostal muscle; thoracic diaphragm; atrioventricular valve; ankle; extraocular muscle; More reference expression data |
| BioGPS | More reference expression data |
Gene ontology
| Molecular function | protein phosphatase 2B binding; protein binding; telethonin binding; actin binding; FATZ binding |
| Cellular component | cytoplasm; sarcomere; actin cytoskeleton; Z discdkac |
| Biological process | myofibril assembly; biological process; negative regulation of transcription by RNA polymerase II; skeletal muscle tissue development; skeletal muscle fiber adaptation; sarcomere organization; negative regulation of calcineurin-NFAT signaling cascade |
Sources:Amigo / QuickGO
Orthologs
| Databases | NCBI: entry; OMA: entry |
| Species | Human | Mouse |
| Entrez | 51778 | 59006 |
| Ensembl | ENSG00000172399 | ENSMUSG00000028116 |
| UniProt | Q9NPC6 | Q9JJW5 |
| RefSeq (mRNA) | NM_016599 | NM_021503; NM_001355462 |
| RefSeq (protein) | NP_057683 | NP_067478; NP_001342391 |
| Location (UCSC) | Chr 4: 119.14 – 119.19 Mb | Chr 3: 122.8 – 122.83 Mb |
| PubMed search |
- Wikidata
| View/Edit Human | View/Edit Mouse |

Myozenin-2, also referred to as Calsarcin-1, is a protein that in humans is encoded by the MYOZ2 gene. The Calsarcin-1 isoform is a muscle protein expressed in cardiac muscle and slow-twitch skeletal muscle, which functions to tether calcineurin to alpha-actinin at Z-discs, and inhibit the pathological cardiac hypertrophic response. This differs from the fast-skeletal muscle isoform, calsarcin-2.

== Structure ==
Calsarcin-1 is a 29.9 kDa protein composed of 264 amino acids. Calsarcin-1 and calsarcin-2 are only 31% homologous (94 identical amino acids), exhibiting the highest homology at N- and C-termini. Calsarcin-1 binds to alpha-actinin, gamma-filamin, telethonin, ZASP/Cypher and calcineurin. The binding region of calsarcin-1 to alpha-actinin is localized to amino acids 153-200, and that of calsarcin-1 to calcineurin is amino acids 217-240.

== Function ==
The function of calsarcin-1 in cardiac and slow-skeletal muscle has been illuminated through studies in transgenic animals. Mice lacking the MYOZ2 gene (MYOZ2-/-) are generally sensitized to calcineurin signaling in both muscle types. In slow-skeletal muscle, MYOZ2-/- show increased slow-twitch muscle fibers. In cardiac, MYOZ2-/- show induction of the fetal gene program typical of pathologic hypertrophy, however there was no evidence of hypertrophied morphometry at baseline. However, upon calcineurin activation or pressure overload-induced pathologic hypertrophy, MYOZ2-/- exhibited exaggerated cardiac hypertrophy, demonstrating that calsarcin-1 negatively modulates the function of calcineurin during pathologic hypertrophic remodeling. Additional studies supported these findings in demonstrating that adenoviral overexpression of calsarcin-1 attenuated Gq alpha subunit-stimuated hypertrophy and ANP induction, by Angiotensin II, phenylephrine and endothelin-1 agonists in neonatal cardiomyocytes. Overexpression of calsarcin-1 in mice (CS1Tg) was protective against Angiotensin II-induced pathologic cardiac hypertrophy, evidenced by preserved fractional shortening and contractility, as well as a blunted induction of the fetal hypertrophic gene program and significantly reduced expression of calcineurin-stimulated MCIP1.4 gene expression. Taken together, these studies strongly support a role for calsarcin-1 in suppressing pathologic cardiac hypertrophy.

== Clinical Significance ==
Two missense mutations in MYOZ2, Ser48Pro and Ile246Met, have been shown to be causal for rare forms of familial hypertrophic cardiomyopathy.
