= Palladin =

Protein-coding gene in the species Homo sapiens

PALLD
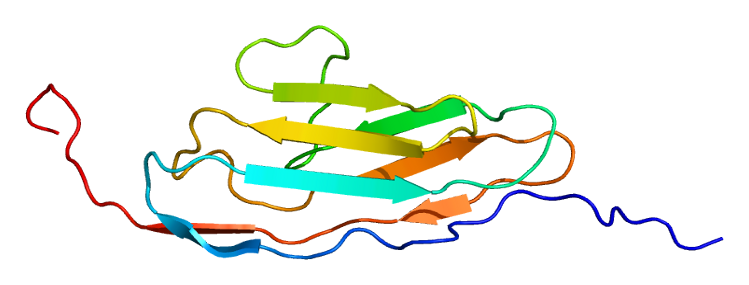

Identifiers
- Aliases: PALLD, CGI-151, CGI151, MYN, PNCA1, SIH002, palladin, cytoskeletal associated protein
- External IDs: OMIM: 608092; MGI: 1919583; GeneCards: PALLD
Available structures
PDB	Ortholog search: PDBe RCSB
PDB	List of PDB id codes 2DM2, 2DM3

Gene location (Human)
Chr.	Chromosome 4 (human)
Band	4q32.3	Start	168,497,052 bp
Band	4q32.3	End	168,928,457 bp

Gene location (Mouse)
Chr.	Chromosome 8 (mouse)
Band	8|8 B3.1	Start	61,964,467 bp
Band	8|8 B3.1	End	62,355,724 bp
RNA expression pattern
Bgee	Human / Mouse (ortholog); Top expressed in: saphenous vein; right ventricle; tail of epididymis; hair follicle; visceral pleura; seminal vesicula; myometrium; right coronary artery; popliteal artery; tibial arteries / Top expressed in: umbilical cord; atrium; atrioventricular valve; interventricular septum; endocardial cushion; left lung lobe; ventricle of the heart; uterus; gastrula; left ventricle; More reference expression data
BioGPS	n/a
Gene ontology
Molecular function	muscle alpha-actinin binding; protein binding; actin binding; cell-cell adhesion mediator activity
Cellular component	cell projection; focal adhesion; growth cone; ruffle; plasma membrane; axon; cell junction; Z discdkac; actin filament; actin cytoskeleton; podosome; cytoskeleton; nucleus; lamellipodium; cytoplasm; cytosol
Biological process	epithelial cell morphogenesis; keratinocyte development; cytoskeleton organization; actin cytoskeleton organization; cell migration; homophilic cell adhesion via plasma membrane adhesion molecules; axon guidance; dendrite self-avoidance
Sources:Amigo / QuickGO
Orthologs
Databases	NCBI: entry; OMA: entry
Species	Human	Mouse
Entrez	23022	72333
Ensembl	ENSG00000129116	ENSMUSG00000058056
UniProt	Q8WX93	Q9ET54
RefSeq (mRNA)	NM_001166108; NM_001166109; NM_001166110; NM_016081; NM_001367567 NM_001367568; NM_001367569; NM_001367570	NM_001081390; NM_001293772; NM_001293773; NM_001293774
RefSeq (protein)	NP_001159580; NP_001159581; NP_001159582; NP_057165; NP_001354496 NP_001354497; NP_001354498; NP_001354499	NP_001074859; NP_001280701; NP_001280702; NP_001280703
Location (UCSC)	Chr 4: 168.5 – 168.93 Mb	Chr 8: 61.96 – 62.36 Mb
PubMed search
- Wikidata
View/Edit Human	View/Edit Mouse

Palladin is a protein that in humans is encoded by the PALLD gene. Palladin is a component of actin-containing microfilaments that control cell shape, adhesion, and contraction.

== Discovery ==
Palladin was characterised independently by two research groups, first in the lab of Carol Otey (in 2000) and then in the lab of Olli Carpén (in 2001). It is a part of the myotilin-myopalladin-palladin family and may play an important role in modulating the actin cytoskeleton. Palladin, in contrast to myotilin and myopalladin, which are expressed only in striated muscle, is expressed ubiquitously in cells of mesenchymal origin.

Palladin was named after the Italian Renaissance architect Andrea Palladio, reflecting its localization to architectural elements of the cell.

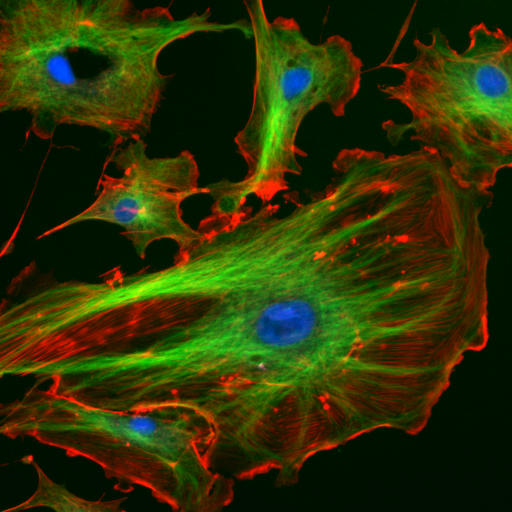
The eukaryotic cytoskeleton. Palladin is one component of this complex cellular machinery.

== Isoforms ==
In humans, it appears that seven different isoforms exist, some of which arise through alternative splicing. In mice, three major isoforms of palladin arise from a single gene. These isoforms contain between three and five copies (depending on the isoform) of an Ig-like domain and between one and two copies of a polyproline domain.

== Function ==
Palladin's precise biological role is poorly understood, but it has been shown to play a role in cytoskeletal organization, embryonic development, cell motility, scar formation in the skin, and nerve cell development.

== Disease linkage ==
Recently, it has been demonstrated that palladin RNA is overexpressed in patients with pancreatic neoplasia, and that palladin is both overexpressed and mutated in an inherited form of pancreatic cancer. The palladin mutation identified in familial pancreatic cancer may be unique to a single North American family, as this same mutation has not been found in any other European or North American populations, respectively, in two other genetic studies.

Further, Salaria et al. have shown that palladin is overexpressed in the non-neoplastic stroma of pancreatic cancer, but only rarely in the cancer cells per se, suggesting that palladin's role in this disease may involve changes in the tumor microenvironment. More research is clearly required before this protein and its role in neoplasia can be fully understood.

Disease-causing mutations have also been identified in the two other members of this gene family. Myotilin mutations cause a form of limb-girdle muscular dystrophy, and mutations in myopalladin cause an inherited form of heart disease (dilated cardiomyopathy).

== Interactions ==
PALLD has been shown to interact with EZR.
