= SYNPO2 =

Protein-coding gene in the species Homo sapiens

Identifiers
- Aliases: SYNPO2, synaptopodin 2, SYISL
- External IDs: MGI: 2153070; GeneCards: SYNPO2

Gene location (Human)
Chr.	Chromosome 4 (human)
Band	4q26	Start	118,850,688 bp
Band	4q26	End	119,061,247 bp

Gene location (Mouse)
Chr.	Chromosome 3 (mouse)
Band	3|3 G1	Start	122,870,168 bp
Band	3|3 G1	End	123,029,798 bp
RNA expression pattern
Bgee	Human / Mouse (ortholog); Top expressed in: saphenous vein; tail of epididymis; seminal vesicula; Skeletal muscle tissue of rectus abdominis; Skeletal muscle tissue of biceps brachii; nipple; urethra; body of tongue; superficial temporal artery; pericardium / Top expressed in: triceps brachii muscle; ankle; temporal muscle; soleus muscle; digastric muscle; sternocleidomastoid muscle; gastrocnemius muscle; thoracic diaphragm; extraocular muscle; intercostal muscle; More reference expression data
BioGPS	n/a
Gene ontology
Molecular function	14-3-3 protein binding; protein binding; muscle alpha-actinin binding; actin binding; filamin binding; alpha-actinin binding; protein-macromolecule adaptor activity
Cellular component	cytoplasm; nucleus; cytosol; intracellular membrane-bounded organelle; stress fiber; vesicle tethering complex; cytoskeleton; focal adhesion; cell junction; actin cytoskeleton; Z discdkac
Biological process	autophagosome assembly; positive regulation of cell migration; positive regulation of actin filament bundle assembly; regulation of Rho-dependent protein serine/threonine kinase activity; chaperone-mediated autophagy
Sources:Amigo / QuickGO
Orthologs
Databases	NCBI: entry; OMA: entry
Species	Human	Mouse
Entrez	171024	118449
Ensembl	ENSG00000172403	ENSMUSG00000050315
UniProt	Q9UMS6	Q91YE8
RefSeq (mRNA)	NM_001128933; NM_001128934; NM_001286754; NM_001286755; NM_133477 NM_001389263; NM_001389264	NM_080451; NM_001388502; NM_001389265; NM_001389266
RefSeq (protein)	NP_001122405; NP_001122406; NP_001273683; NP_001273684; NP_597734	NP_536699; NP_001375431; NP_001376194; NP_001376195
Location (UCSC)	Chr 4: 118.85 – 119.06 Mb	Chr 3: 122.87 – 123.03 Mb
PubMed search
- Wikidata
View/Edit Human	View/Edit Mouse

Myopodin protein, also called Synaptopodin-2 is a protein that in humans is encoded by the SYNPO2 gene. Myopodin is expressed in cardiac, smooth muscle and skeletal muscle, and localizes to Z-disc structures.

== Structure ==
Myopodin is a 117.4 kDa protein composed of 1093 amino acids, although four alternatively-spliced isoforms have been described. Myopodin contains one PPXY motif, multiple PXXP motifs, and two potential nuclear localization sequences (one N-terminal and one C-terminal). PPXY motifs have been shown to mediate interactions, and PXXP motifs represent potential sites of interaction for SH3 domain-containing proteins. Myopodin contains a novel actin binding site (between amino acids 410 and 563) in the center of the protein.

== Function ==
During myotube differentiation, myopodin interacts with stress fibers prior to co-localizing with alpha actinin-2 at Z-discs in mature striated muscle cells. Myopodin has been shown to shuttle between the nucleus and cytoplasm in myoblasts and myotubes in response to stress; its export from the nucleus is sensitive to lemtomycin B. The nuclear localization of myopodin is sensitive to Importin 13, which directly binds myopodin and facilitates its translocation. Importin binding and nuclear import of myopodin appears to be mediated by serine/threonine phosphorylation-dependent binding of myopodin to 14-3-3 beta Myopodin appears to regulate compartmentalized, intracellular signal transduction between the Z-disc and nucleus in cardiac muscle cells, by forming a Z-disc signaling complex with alpha actinin-2, calcineurin, CaMKII, muscle-specific A-kinase anchoring protein, and myomegalin. Specifically, phosphorylation by protein kinase A or CaMKII, and dephosphorylation by calcineurin facilitates the binding or release, respectively, of 14-3-3-beta, and the corresponding nuclear or cytoplasmic localization, respectively, of myopodin.

== Interactions ==
Myopodin interacts with:

- 14-3-3 beta,
- Actin, alpha, cardiac muscle 1,
- Actinin, alpha 2,
- Calcineurin,
- CaMKII,
- Importin 13, and
- Protein kinase A.
