= Telethonin =

Protein in the human body

TCAP
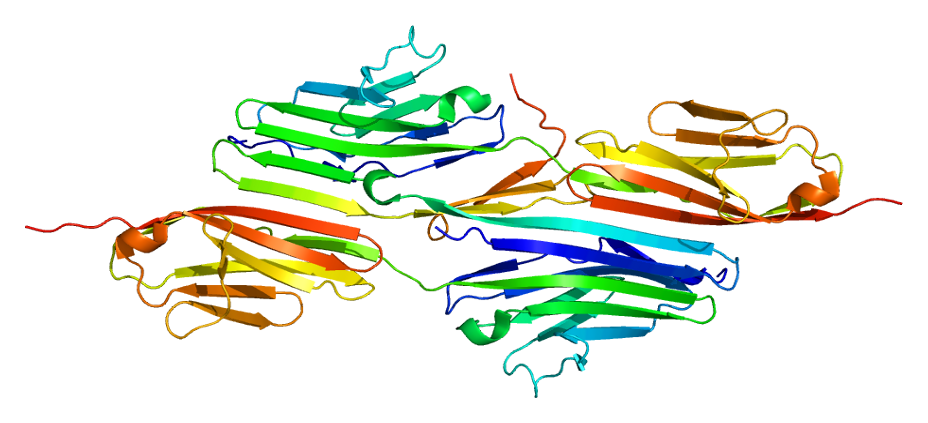

Identifiers
- Aliases: TCAP, CMD1N, LGMD2G, T-cap, TELE, telethonin, CMH25, titin-cap, LGMDR7
- External IDs: OMIM: 604488; MGI: 1330233; GeneCards: TCAP
Available structures
PDB	Ortholog search: PDBe RCSB
PDB	List of PDB id codes 1YA5, 2F8V

Gene location (Human)
Chr.	Chromosome 17 (human)
Band	17q12	Start	39,665,349 bp
Band	17q12	End	39,666,554 bp

Gene location (Mouse)
Chr.	Chromosome 11 (mouse)
Band	11|11 D	Start	98,274,637 bp
Band	11|11 D	End	98,275,779 bp
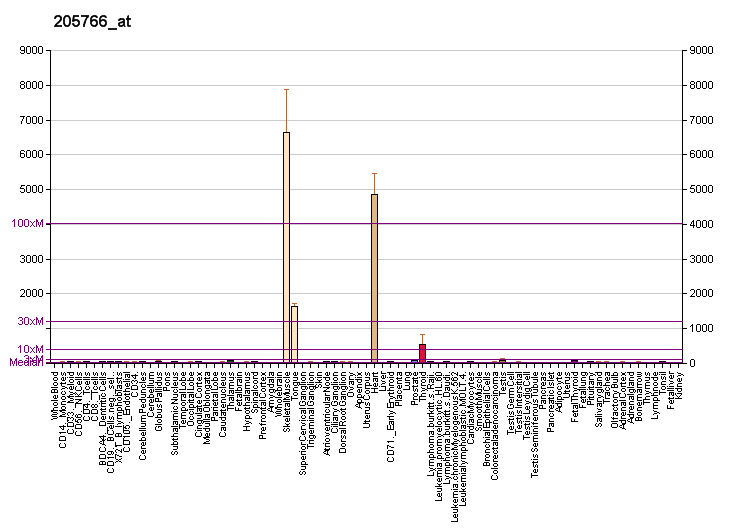
RNA expression pattern
Bgee	Human / Mouse (ortholog); Top expressed in: apex of heart; muscle of thigh; Skeletal muscle tissue of rectus abdominis; right auricle of heart; gastrocnemius muscle; thoracic diaphragm; glutes; myocardium of left ventricle; triceps brachii muscle; body of tongue / Top expressed in: muscle of thigh; ankle; temporal muscle; triceps brachii muscle; digastric muscle; sternocleidomastoid muscle; medial head of gastrocnemius muscle; right ventricle; knee joint; intercostal muscle; More reference expression data
BioGPS	More reference expression data
Gene ontology
Molecular function	protein-macromolecule adaptor activity; transmembrane transporter binding; titin Z domain binding; titin binding; BMP binding; protein binding; FATZ binding; structural constituent of muscle
Cellular component	cytoplasm; cytosol; I band; sarcomere; Z discdkac
Biological process	somitogenesis; response to muscle stretch; sarcomerogenesis; cardiac muscle contraction; adult heart development; otic vesicle formation; skeletal muscle contraction; cardiac muscle hypertrophy; cardiac muscle tissue morphogenesis; skeletal muscle thin filament assembly; detection of muscle stretch; cardiac myofibril assembly; cardiac muscle hypertrophy in response to stress; detection of mechanical stimulus; muscle filament sliding; sarcomere organization; skeletal muscle myosin thick filament assembly; protein-containing complex assembly
Sources:Amigo / QuickGO
Orthologs
Databases	NCBI: entry; OMA: entry
Species	Human	Mouse
Entrez	8557	21393
Ensembl	ENSG00000173991	ENSMUSG00000007877
UniProt	O15273	O70548
RefSeq (mRNA)	NM_003673	NM_011540
RefSeq (protein)	NP_003664; NP_003664.1	NP_035670
Location (UCSC)	Chr 17: 39.67 – 39.67 Mb	Chr 11: 98.27 – 98.28 Mb
PubMed search
- Wikidata
View/Edit Human	View/Edit Mouse

Telethonin, also known as Tcap, is a protein that in humans is encoded by the TCAP gene. Telethonin is expressed in cardiac and skeletal muscle at Z-discs and functions to regulate sarcomere assembly, T-tubule function and apoptosis. Telethonin has been implicated in several diseases, including limb-girdle muscular dystrophy, hypertrophic cardiomyopathy, dilated cardiomyopathy and idiopathic cardiomyopathy.

== Structure ==
Telethonin is a 19.0 kDa protein composed of 167 amino acids. Telethonin has a unique β-sheet structure, which enables antiparallel association with the Titin Z1-Z2 domains in cardiac and skeletal muscle. Structural analysis of full-length Telethonin with the N-terminal region of Titin indicate that the C-terminus of Telethonin is critical for the dimerization of two Telethonin/Titin complexes into a higher oligomeric structure.

== Function ==
Telethonin expression is developmentally regulated in both cardiac and skeletal muscle and is thought to be critical to sarcomere assembly. Telethonin was found to be a late assembling protein only present in mature myofibrils at Z-discs.

Telethonin forms a complex with muscle LIM protein (MLP) at sarcomere Z-discs, which constitutes part of the cardiomyocyte stretch sensory mechanism. It has also been shown that Telethonin binds to the beta-subunit of the slow activating component of the delayed rectifier potassium channel, MinK, in areas localized to T-tubule membranes surrounding Z-lines in the inner myocardium. In addition, Telethonin interacts with the sodium channel Na(v)1.5, and alters the activation kinetics via doubling the window current. These data suggest that Telethonin may constitute a mechano-electrical links between Z-lines and T-tubules. Further functional evidence for this has come from studies utilizing a Telethonin-knockout mouse (KO), which have shown that Telethonin is involved in T-tubule structure and function, as well as apoptosis in the heart. Telethonin KO animals showed preserved Titin anchoring at baseline, and instead showed a profound deficit during nuclear biomechanical stress in modulating the turnover of the proapoptotic p53 protein. Telethonin KO animals also displayed calcium transient dysynchrony, T-tubule loss and depressed L-type calcium channel function.

Telethonin is a substrate of titin kinase, protein kinase D (PKD) and CaM Kinase II. Telethonin, as well as TNNI3, MYBPC3 and MYOM2 are phosphorylated by PKD in cardiomyocytes, and this leads to a reduction in calcium sensitivity of myofilaments, as well as accelerated crossbridge kinetics. Bis-phosphorylation of Telethonin specifically at sites Serine-157 and Serine-161 has been shown to be essential for normal T-tubule organization and intracellular calcium transient kinetics.

The intracellular degradation of Telethonin is regulated by MDM2 in a proteasomal-dependent yet ubiquitin-independent manner. Telethonin specifically interacts with the pro-apoptotic protein Siva, suggesting that Telethonin may be involved in the mechanism underlying Coxsackievirus B3 infection in acute and chronic myocarditis

Telethonin was also identified to be targeted and regulated by transcriptional activators CLOCK and BMAL1, thus demonstrating that TCAP is a circadian regulated gene.

== Clinical Significance ==
Mutations in this gene are associated with limb-girdle muscular dystrophy type R7 (previously 2G), hypertrophic cardiomyopathy, dilated cardiomyopathy, idiopathic cardiomyopathy, and gastrointestinal smooth muscle-related diseases.

Two mutations in Telethonin, Thr137Ile and Arg153His have been associated with hypertrophic cardiomyopathy, which enhance the binding of Telethonin with Titin and MYOZ2. The Glu132Gln mutation has been associated with dilated cardiomyopathy, which has the opposite effect in that it impairs the binding of Telethonin with Titin and MYOZ2. Mutations in Titin associated with dilated cardiomyopathy, including Val54Met, have been shown specifically to impair binding of Titin with Telethonin. In a mouse model of dilated cardiomyopathy, recapitulating the human dilated cardiomyopathy mutation in MLP, Trp4Arg, studies have found that this mutation disrupts normal binding and localization of MLP with Telethonin. In a rat model of hypertension-induced cardiomyopathy, a human variant of BMP10, Thr326Ile, showed decreased binding to Telethonin and increased extracellular secretion.

== Interactions ==
Telethonin has been shown to interact with:

- ANKRD2,
- BMP10,
- MLP,
- MinK,
- MDM2,
- MSTN,
- MYOZ1,
- MYOZ2,
- PRKD1,
- SCN5A,
- SIVA, and
- Titin,
