= ADAM12 =

Human protein-coding gene

Identifiers
- Aliases: ADAM12, ADAM12-OT1, CAR10, MCMP, MCMPMltna, MLTN, MLTNA, ADAM metallopeptidase domain 12
- External IDs: OMIM: 602714; MGI: 105378; GeneCards: ADAM12

Gene location (Human)
Chr.	Chromosome 10 (human)
Band	10q26.2	Start	126,012,381 bp
Band	10q26.2	End	126,388,477 bp

Gene location (Mouse)
Chr.	Chromosome 7 (mouse)
Band	7|7 F3	Start	133,484,928 bp
Band	7|7 F3	End	133,833,875 bp
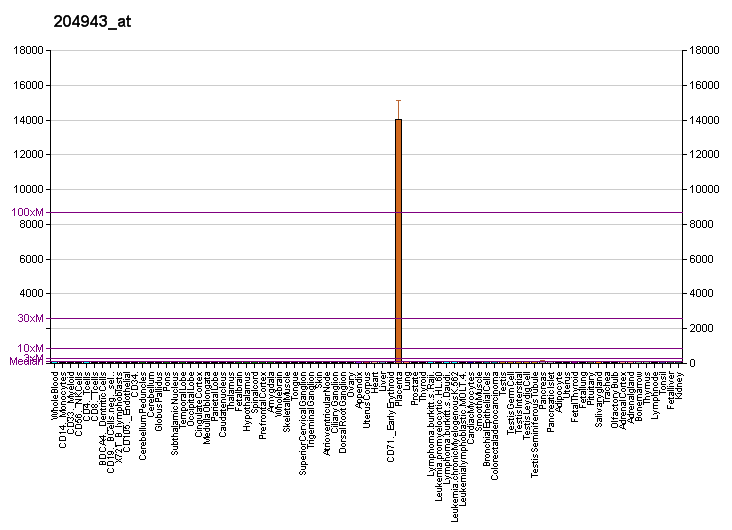

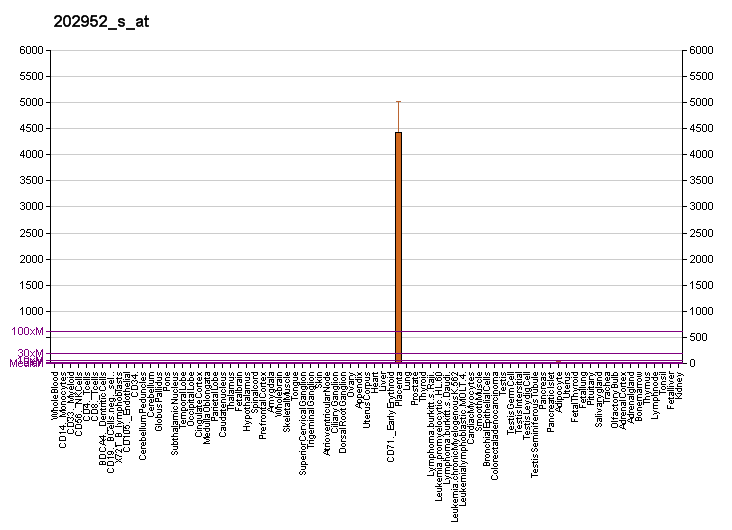

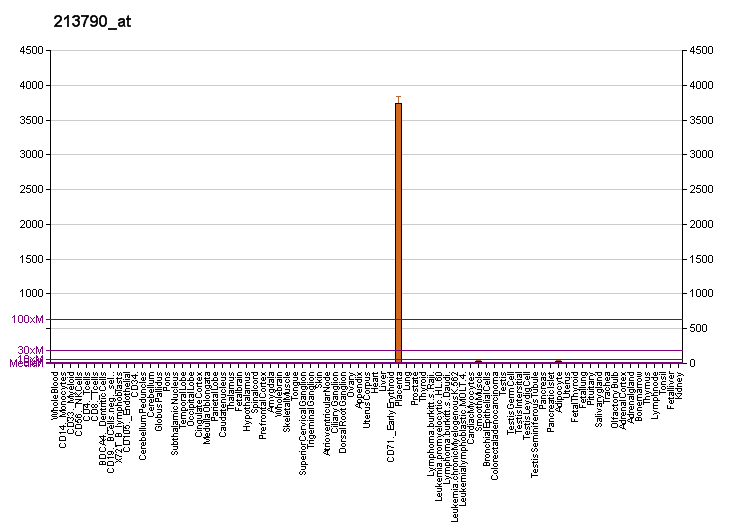
RNA expression pattern
Bgee	Human / Mouse (ortholog); Top expressed in: placenta; stromal cell of endometrium; buccal mucosa cell; tibia; decidua; mucosa of paranasal sinus; cartilage tissue; gallbladder; testicle; tendon of biceps brachii / Top expressed in: gastrula; calvaria; body of femur; mesothelium of peritoneum; umbilical cord; decidua; facial skeleton; efferent ductule; mandible; lesser wing of sphenoid bone; More reference expression data
BioGPS	More reference expression data
Gene ontology
Molecular function	SH3 domain binding; peptidase activity; metalloendopeptidase activity; protein binding; hydrolase activity; metal ion binding; metallopeptidase activity
Cellular component	integral component of membrane; extracellular region; membrane; nucleoplasm; plasma membrane
Biological process	cell adhesion; myoblast fusion; proteolysis; extracellular matrix organization; positive regulation of angiogenesis
Sources:Amigo / QuickGO
Orthologs
Databases	NCBI: entry; OMA: entry
Species	Human	Mouse
Entrez	8038	11489
Ensembl	ENSG00000148848	ENSMUSG00000054555
UniProt	O43184	Q61824
RefSeq (mRNA)	NM_021641; NM_001288973; NM_001288974; NM_001288975; NM_003474	NM_007400
RefSeq (protein)	NP_001275902; NP_001275903; NP_001275904; NP_003465; NP_067673	NP_031426
Location (UCSC)	Chr 10: 126.01 – 126.39 Mb	Chr 7: 133.48 – 133.83 Mb
PubMed search
- Wikidata
View/Edit Human	View/Edit Mouse

Disintegrin and metalloproteinase domain-containing protein 12 (previously Meltrin) is an enzyme that in humans is encoded by the ADAM12 gene. ADAM12 has two splice variants: ADAM12-L, the long form, has a transmembrane region and ADAM12-S, a shorter variant, is soluble and lacks the transmembrane and cytoplasmic domains.

== Function ==
This gene encodes a member of the ADAM (a disintegrin and metalloprotease) protein family. Members of this family are membrane-anchored proteins structurally related to snake venom disintegrins, and have been implicated in a variety of biological processes involving cell-cell and cell-matrix interactions, including fertilization, muscle development, and neurogenesis. This gene has two alternatively spliced transcripts: a shorter secreted form and a longer membrane-bound form. The shorter form is found to stimulate myogenesis.

== Clinical Significance ==
ADAM 12, a metalloprotease that binds insulin growth factor binding protein-3 (IGFBP-3), appears to be an effective early Down syndrome marker. Decreased levels of ADAM 12 may be detected in cases of trisomy 21 as early as 8 to 10 weeks gestation. Maternal serum ADAM 12 and PAPP-A levels at 8 to 9 weeks gestation in combination with maternal age yielded a 91% detection rate for Down syndrome at a 5% false-positive rate. When nuchal translucency data from approximately 12 weeks gestation was added, this increased the detection rate to 97%.

ADAM12 has also been implicated in the development of pathology in various cancers, hypertension, liver fibrogenesis, and asthma. In asthma, ADAM12 is upregulated in lung epithelium in response to TNF-alpha.

In a study of about 1200 persons with extremely high intelligence (IQ about 170), variants of the gene were associated with high IQ compared with a general population.

== Interactions ==
ADAM12 has been shown to interact with:

- ACTN2,
- IGFBP3, and
- PIK3R1.
