= Dilated cardiomyopathy =

Condition involving an enlarged, ineffective heart

- Other names: Congestive cardiomyopathy, idiopathic cardiomyopathy, primary cardiomyopathy
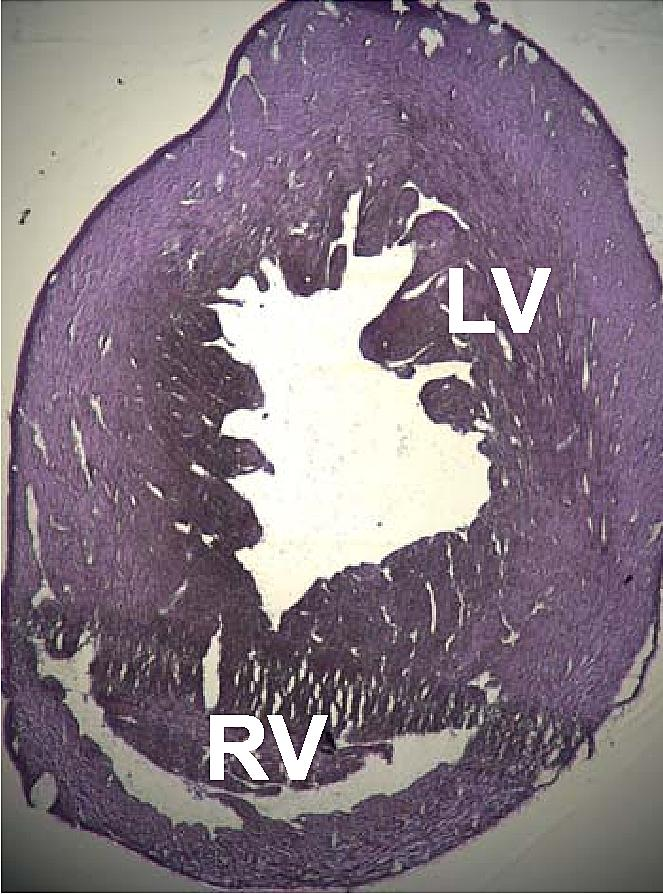
- Mouse heart slice showing dilated cardiomyopathy
- Specialty: Cardiology
- Symptoms: Feeling tired, leg swelling, shortness of breath, chest pain, fainting
- Complications: Heart failure, heart valve disease, irregular heartbeat
- Usual onset: Middle age
- Types: Tachycardia-induced, others
- Causes: Genetics, alcohol, cocaine, certain toxins, complications of pregnancy, in many cases the cause remains unclear, certain infections
- Diagnostic method: Supported by electrocardiogram, chest X-ray, echocardiogram
- Differential diagnosis: Coronary artery disease, heart valve disease, pulmonary embolism, other cardiomyopathy
- Treatment: Lifestyle changes, medications, implantable cardioverter defibrillator, cardiac resynchronization therapy (CRT), heart transplant
- Medication: ACE inhibitor, beta blocker, diuretic, blood thinners
- Prognosis: Five-year survival rate ~50%
- Frequency: 1 in 2500

Dilated cardiomyopathy (DCM) is a condition in which the heart becomes enlarged and cannot pump blood effectively. Symptoms vary from none to feeling tired, leg swelling, and shortness of breath. It may also result in chest pain or fainting. Complications can include heart failure, heart valve disease, or an irregular heartbeat.

Causes include genetics, alcohol, cocaine, certain toxins, complications of pregnancy, and certain infections. Coronary artery disease and high blood pressure may play a role, but are not the primary cause. In many cases the cause remains unclear. It is a type of cardiomyopathy, a group of diseases that primarily affects the heart muscle. The diagnosis may be supported by an electrocardiogram, chest X-ray, or echocardiogram.

In those with heart failure, treatment may include medications in the ACE inhibitor, beta blocker, and diuretic families. A low salt diet may also be helpful. In those with certain types of irregular heartbeat, blood thinners or an implantable cardioverter defibrillator may be recommended. Cardiac resynchronization therapy (CRT) may be necessary. If other measures are not effective a heart transplant may be an option in some.

During the last two decades, there has been an increase in the number of patients diagnosed, and DCM represents the most common form of cardiomyopathy in adults. The most recent figures indicate that about 3 per 1,000 men and 1 per 1,000 women are affected. It is associated with a substantial excess mortality compared with the general population, ranging from about a 32-fold higher mortality in the youngest adults with DCM to about a 2-fold increase in the oldest patients. It can also occur in children and is the most common type of cardiomyopathy in this age group.

DCM predominantly affects the left ventricle as it has the highest load. Comparing the left to the right, the right ventricle only needs to circulate blood to the pulmonary arteries, which are relatively close in proximity. The left ventricle however, is responsible for pumping blood to the remaining parts of the body that are not the lungs. This load difference results in the cardiac muscle of the left ventricle getting more wear and stress throughout the course of a day, resulting in a higher vulnerability to DCM than the right ventricle.

== Signs and symptoms ==
Dilated cardiomyopathy develops insidiously, and may not initially cause symptoms significant enough to impact on quality of life. Nevertheless, many people experience significant symptoms. These might include:

- Shortness of breath
- Syncope (fainting)
- Angina, but only in the presence of ischemic heart disease

A person who has dilated cardiomyopathy may have an enlarged heart, with pulmonary edema and an elevated jugular venous pressure and a low pulse pressure. Signs of mitral and tricuspid regurgitation may be present.

== Causes ==
Although in many cases no cause is apparent, dilated cardiomyopathy is probably the result of damage to the myocardium produced by a variety of toxic, metabolic, or infectious agents. In many cases the cause remains unclear. It may be due to fibrous change of the myocardium from a previous myocardial infarction. Or, it may be the late sequelae of acute viral myocarditis, such as with Coxsackie B virus and other enteroviruses possibly mediated through an immunologic mechanism. Specific autoantibodies are detectable in some cases.

Other causes include:

- Chagas disease, due to Trypanosoma cruzi. This is the most common infectious cause of dilated cardiomyopathy in Latin America
- Pregnancy: Dilated cardiomyopathy occurs late in gestation or several weeks to months postpartum as a peripartum cardiomyopathy. It is reversible in half of cases.
- Alcohol use disorder (alcoholic cardiomyopathy)
- Non-alcoholic toxic insults include administration of certain chemotherapeutic agents, in particular doxorubicin (Adriamycin), and cobalt.
- Thyroid disease
- Inflammatory diseases such as sarcoidosis and connective tissue diseases
- Tachycardia-induced cardiomyopathy
- Muscular dystrophy
- Tuberculosis: 1 to 2% of TB cases.
- Autoimmune mechanisms
- Thiamine deficiency

Recent studies have shown that those subjects with an extremely high occurrence (several thousands a day) of premature ventricular contractions (extrasystole) can develop dilated cardiomyopathy. In these cases, if the extrasystole are reduced or removed (for example, via ablation therapy) the cardiomyopathy usually regresses.

=== Genetics ===
Genetic associations with dilated cardiomyopathy
Type	OMIM	Gene	Locus
CMD1A	115200	LMNA	1q21
CMD1B	600884	unknown (TMOD1 candidate)	9q13
CMD1C	601493	LDB3	10q22-q23
CMD1D	601494	TNNT2	1q32
CMD1E	601154	SCN5A	3p
CMD1F	602067		6q23
CMD1G	604145	TTN	2q31
CMD1H	604288		2q14-q22
CMD1I	604765	DES	
CMD1K	605582		6q12-q16
CMD1L	606685	SGCD	5q33
CMD1M	607482	CSRP3	11p15.1
CMD1N	607487	TCAP	17q12
CMD1O	608569	ABCC9	12p12.1
CMD1P	609909	PLN	6q22.1
CMD1Q	609915		7q22.3-q31.1
CMD1R		ACTC	15q14
CMD1S		MYH7	14q12
CMD1T		TMPO	12q22
CMD1U		PSEN1	14q24.3
CMD1V		PSEN2	1q31-q42
CMD1W	611407	VCL	10q22-q23
CMD1X		FCMD	9q31
CMD1Y	611878	TPM1	15q22.1
CMD1Z	611879	TNNC1	3p21.3-p14.3
CMD1AA	612158	ACTN2	1q42-q43
CMD2A	611880	TNNI3	19q13.4
CMD3A	300069	TAZ	Xq28
CMD3B	302045	DMD	Xp21.2
		ALPK3	15q25.3

About 25–35% of affected individuals have familial forms of the disease, with most mutations affecting genes encoding cytoskeletal proteins, while some affect other proteins involved in contraction. The disease is genetically heterogeneous, but the most common form of its transmission is an autosomal dominant pattern. Autosomal recessive (as found, for example, in Alström syndrome), X-linked (as in Duchenne muscular dystrophy), and mitochondrial inheritance of the disease is also found. Some relatives of those affected by dilated cardiomyopathy have preclinical, asymptomatic heart-muscle changes.

Other cytoskeletal proteins involved in DCM include α-cardiac actin, desmin, and the nuclear lamins A and C. Mitochondrial deletions and mutations presumably cause DCM by altering myocardial ATP generation. Nuclear coding variations for mitochondrial complex II have also shown pathogenicity for dilated cardiomyopathy, designated 1GG for SDHA.

Kayvanpour et al. performed 2016 a meta-analysis with the largest dataset available on genotype-phenotype associations in DCM and mutations in lamin (LMNA), phospholamban (PLN), RNA Binding Motif Protein 20 (RBM20), Cardiac Myosin Binding Protein C (MYBPC3), Myosin Heavy Chain 7 (MYH7), Cardiac Troponin T 2 (TNNT2), and Cardiac Troponin I (TNNI3). They also reviewed recent studies investigating genotype-phenotype associations in DCM patients with titin (TTN) mutations. LMNA and PLN mutation carriers showed a high prevalence of cardiac transplantation and ventricular arrhythmia. Dysrhythmias and sudden cardiac death (SCD) was shown to occur even before the manifestation of DCM and heart failure symptoms in LMNA mutation carriers.

== Pathophysiology ==
Illustration of a Normal Heart vs. Heart with Dilated Cardiomyopathy

The progression of heart failure is associated with left ventricular remodeling, which manifests as gradual increases in left ventricular end-diastolic and end-systolic volumes, wall thinning, and a change in chamber geometry to a more spherical, less elongated shape. This process is usually associated with a continuous decline in ejection fraction. The concept of cardiac remodeling was initially developed to describe changes that occur in the days and months following myocardial infarction.

=== Compensation effects ===
As DCM progresses, two compensatory mechanisms are activated in response to impaired myocyte contractility and reduced stroke volume:

- Frank-Starling law
- Neurohormonal feedback, via activation of the sympathetic nervous system and the renin-angiotensin system.

These responses initially compensate for decreased cardiac output and maintain those with DCM as asymptomatic. Eventually, however, these mechanisms become detrimental, intravascular volume becomes too great, and progressive dilatation leads to heart failure symptoms.

=== Computational models ===
Cardiac dilatation is a transversely isotropic, irreversible process resulting from excess strains on the myocardium. A computation model of volumetric, isotropic, and cardiac wall growth predicts the relationship between cardiac strains (e.g. volume overload after myocardial infarction) and dilation using the following governing equations:

$F = F^e \cdot F^g\,$

where $F^e$ is elastic volume stretch that is reversible and $F^g$ is irreversible, isotropic volume growth described by:

$F^g = \mathbb{I}+[\lambda^{g}-1]f_{0}\otimes f_{0} \,$

where $f_{0}$ is a vector, which points along a cardiomyocyte's long axis and $\lambda^g$ is the cardiomyocyte stretch due to growth. The total cardiomyocyte growth is given by:

$\lambda = \lambda^e \cdot F\lambda^g\,$

The above model reveals a gradual dilation of the myocardium, especially the ventricular myocardium, to support the blood volume overload in the chambers. Dilation manifests itself in an increase in total cardiac mass and cardiac diameter. Cardiomyocytes reach their maximum length of 150 $\mu$m in the endocardium and 130 $\mu$m in the epicardium by the addition of sarcomeres. Due to the increase in diameter, the dilated heart appears spherical in shape, as opposed the elliptical shape of a healthy human heart. In addition, the ventricular walls maintain the same thickness, characteristic of pathophysiological cardiac dilation.

=== Valvular effects ===
As the ventricles enlarge, both the mitral and tricuspid valves may lose their ability to come together properly. This loss of coaptation may lead to mitral and tricuspid regurgitation. As a result, those with DCM are at increased risk of atrial fibrillation. Furthermore, stroke volume is decreased and a greater volume load is placed on the ventricle, thus increasing heart failure symptoms.

== Diagnosis ==
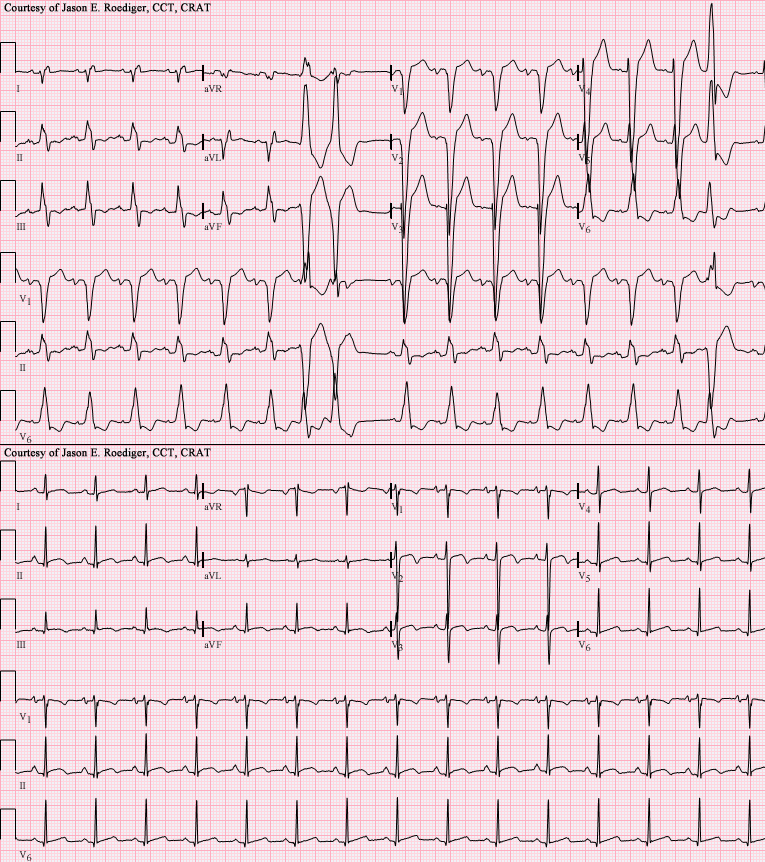
Serial 12-lead ECGs from a 49-year-old black man with cardiomyopathy. (TOP): Sinus tachycardia (rate about 101/min) with LBBB accompanied by RAD (here about 108°). Frequent multifocal PVCs (both singly and in pairs) and left atrial enlargement. (BOTTOM): Same patient about 5 months later status-post orthotopic heart transplant.

Dilated cardiomyopathy on CXR

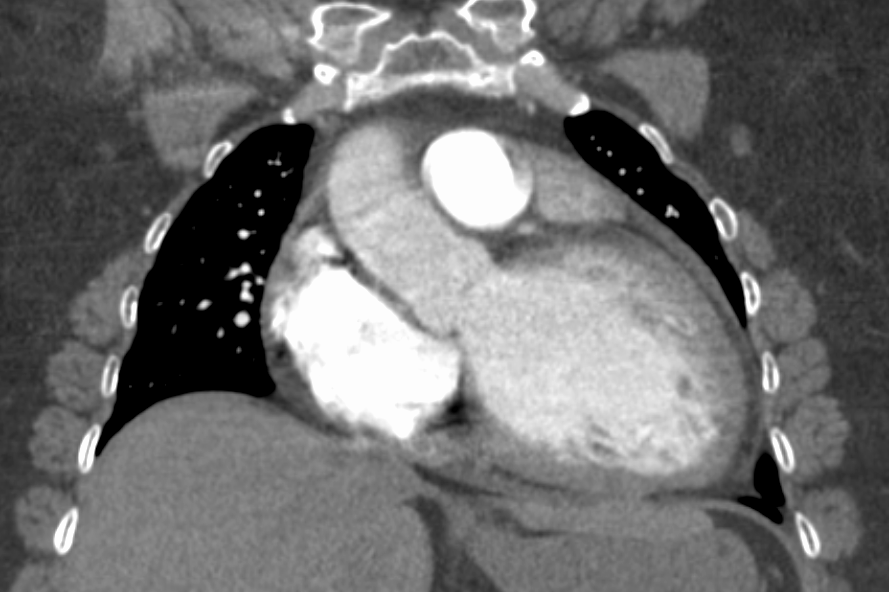
Dilated cardiomyopathy on CT

Generalized enlargement of the heart is seen upon normal chest X-ray. Pleural effusion may also be noticed, which is due to pulmonary venous hypertension.

The electrocardiogram often shows sinus tachycardia or atrial fibrillation, ventricular arrhythmias, left atrial enlargement, and sometimes intraventricular conduction defects and low voltage. When left bundle-branch block (LBBB) is accompanied by right axis deviation (RAD), the rare combination is considered to be highly suggestive of dilated or congestive cardiomyopathy. Echocardiogram shows left ventricular dilatation with normal or thinned walls and reduced ejection fraction. Cardiac catheterization and coronary angiography are often performed to exclude ischemic heart disease.

Genetic testing can be important, since one study has shown that gene mutations in the TTN gene (which codes for a protein called titin) are responsible for "approximately 25% of familial cases of idiopathic dilated cardiomyopathy and 18% of sporadic cases." The results of the genetic testing can help the doctors and patients understand the underlying cause of the dilated cardiomyopathy. Genetic test results can also help guide decisions on whether a patient's relatives should undergo genetic testing (to see if they have the same genetic mutation) and cardiac testing to screen for early findings of dilated cardiomyopathy.

Cardiac magnetic resonance imaging (cardiac MRI) may also provide helpful diagnostic information in patients with dilated cardiomyopathy.

== Treatment ==
=== Medical therapy ===
Drug therapy can slow down progression and in some cases even improve the heart condition. Standard therapy may include salt restriction, ACE inhibitors, diuretics, and beta blockers. Anticoagulants may also be used for antithrombotic therapy. There is some evidence for the benefits of coenzyme Q10 in treating heart failure.

K-strophanthin may improve functional performance in patients with severe cardiac decompensation while digoxin raises cardiac output and ejection fraction only at rest.

=== Electrical treatment ===
Artificial pacemakers may be used in patients with intraventricular conduction delay, and implantable cardioverter-defibrillators in those at risk of arrhythmia. These forms of treatment have been shown to prevent sudden cardiac death, improve symptoms, and reduce hospitalization in patients with systolic heart failure. In addition, an implantable cardioverter-defibrillator should be considered as a therapeutic option for the primary prevention of sudden cardiac death in patients with a confirmed LMNA mutation responsible for dilated cardiomyopathy disease phenotype and clinical risk factors. A novel risk score calculator has been developed that allows calculation of risk of sustained ventricular arrhythmia in the next 5 years in patients with DCM. https://www.ikard.pl/SVA/

=== Surgical treatment ===
In patients with advanced disease who are refractory to medical therapy, heart transplantation may be considered. For these people, 1-year survival approaches 90% and over 50% survive more than 20 years.

Another form of treatment includes Surgical Ventricular Remodeling (SVR). In SVR, a surgeon removes a failing portion of the heart wall and closes the remaining opening to restore the ventricle’s normal shape. Restoring the shape allows for a more efficient outflow produced by the heart.

Pharmacologically, beta-blockers can be used. They lower the individuals blood pressure and create a lower load the heart must push in order to fully circular the blood.

== Epidemiology ==
Although the disease is more common in African-Americans than in Caucasians, it may occur in any patient population. Approximately 6 cases occur a year for every 1,000 people in the U.S. . The age adjusted mortality rate (AAMR) has declined over the last two decades from 5.19 deaths to 1.98 deaths per 100,000. Because the AAMR has decreased, this suggests that the overall death rate after accounting for age, has a net negative effect. Though, during the COVID-19 pandemic, the AAMR had increased to 2.34, suggesting the presence of the pandemic likely had an impact on it.

Sex wise, men are at a significantly higher risk compared to women. Significant trends show when measuring the age of affected individuals. African Americans tend to show signs by the age of 49 while Caucasian men showed at age 55.

== Research directions ==
Therapies that support reverse remodeling have been investigated, and this may suggests a new approach to the prognosis of cardiomyopathies (see ventricular remodeling).

== Animals ==
In some types of animals, both a hereditary and acquired version of dilated cardiomyopathy has been documented.

=== Dogs ===
Dilated cardiomyopathy is a heritable disease in some dog breeds, including the Boxer, Dobermann, Great Dane, Irish Wolfhound, and St Bernard. Treatment is based on medication, including ACE inhibitors, loop diuretics, and phosphodiesterase inhibitors.

An acquired variation of dilated cardiomyopathy describing a link between certain diets was discovered in 2019 by researchers at University of California, Davis School of Veterinary Medicine who published a report on the development of dilated cardiomyopathy in dog breeds lacking the genetic predisposition, particularly in Golden Retrievers. The diets associated with DCM were described as "BEG" (boutique, exotic-ingredient, and/or grain-free) dog foods, as well as legume-rich diets. For treating diet-related DCM, food changes, taurine and carnitine supplementation may be indicated even if the dog does not have a documented taurine or carnitine deficiency although the cost of carnitine supplementation may be viewed as prohibitive by some

=== Cats ===
Dilated cardiomyopathy is also a disease affecting some cat breeds, including the Oriental Shorthair, Burmese, Persian, and Abyssinian. In cats, taurine deficiency is the most common cause of dilated cardiomyopathy. As opposed to these hereditary forms, non-hereditary DCM used to be common in the overall cat population before the addition of taurine to commercial cat food.

=== Other animals ===
There is also a high incidence of heritable dilated cardiomyopathy in captive golden hamsters (Mesocricetus auratus), due in no small part to their being highly inbred. The incidence is high enough that several strains of Golden Hamster have been developed to serve as animal models in clinical testing for human forms of the disease.
