= KCNA5 =

Protein-coding gene in humans

Identifiers
- Aliases: KCNA5, ATFB7, HCK1, HK2, HPCN1, KV1.5, PCN1, potassium voltage-gated channel subfamily A member 5
- External IDs: OMIM: 176267; MGI: 96662; GeneCards: KCNA5

Gene location (Human)
Chr.	Chromosome 12 (human)
Band	12p13.32	Start	5,043,879 bp
Band	12p13.32	End	5,046,788 bp

Gene location (Mouse)
Chr.	Chromosome 6 (mouse)
Band	6 F3|6 61.35 cM	Start	126,509,514 bp
Band	6 F3|6 61.35 cM	End	126,512,375 bp
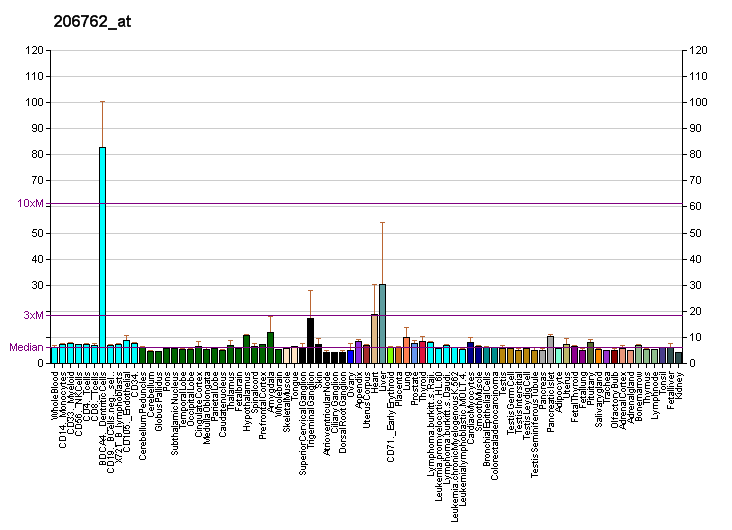
RNA expression pattern
Bgee	Human / Mouse (ortholog); Top expressed in: cardiac muscle tissue of right atrium; right auricle of heart; right coronary artery; popliteal artery; tibial arteries; testicle; Epithelium of choroid plexus; ascending aorta; left coronary artery; Descending thoracic aorta / Top expressed in: olfactory epithelium; epithelium of lens; trigeminal nerve; retina; endocardial cushion; olfactory tubercle; neural layer of retina; renal pelvis; nucleus accumbens; myocardium of ventricle; More reference expression data
BioGPS	More reference expression data
Gene ontology
Molecular function	potassium channel inhibitor activity; outward rectifier potassium channel activity; potassium channel activity; scaffold protein binding; voltage-gated potassium channel activity involved in atrial cardiac muscle cell action potential repolarization; voltage-gated potassium channel activity involved in SA node cell action potential repolarization; delayed rectifier potassium channel activity; voltage-gated potassium channel activity involved in bundle of His cell action potential repolarization; voltage-gated ion channel activity; ion channel activity; protein binding; alpha-actinin binding; voltage-gated potassium channel activity; signaling receptor binding; protein kinase binding
Cellular component	integral component of membrane; Golgi apparatus; membrane; intercalated disc; intracellular canaliculus; voltage-gated potassium channel complex; plasma membrane; integral component of plasma membrane; potassium channel complex; Z discdkac; endoplasmic reticulum; perinuclear region of cytoplasm; caveola; membrane raft; cell surface
Biological process	Notch signaling pathway; regulation of atrial cardiac muscle cell membrane repolarization; positive regulation of myoblast proliferation; regulation of potassium ion transport; response to hypoxia; membrane hyperpolarization; regulation of insulin secretion; response to hyperoxia; regulation of membrane potential; regulation of ion transmembrane transport; response to mechanical stimulus; ion transport; response to organic substance; membrane repolarization during bundle of His cell action potential; positive regulation of G1/S transition of mitotic cell cycle; potassium ion transport; regulation of vasoconstriction; potassium ion homeostasis; protein complex oligomerization; transmembrane transport; potassium ion transmembrane transport; negative regulation of potassium ion transport; atrial cardiac muscle cell action potential; membrane repolarization during SA node cell action potential; regulation of heart rate by cardiac conduction; protein homooligomerization; response to hydrogen peroxide; negative regulation of cytosolic calcium ion concentration; membrane repolarization during atrial cardiac muscle cell action potential; regulation of molecular function; transport; potassium ion export across plasma membrane
Sources:Amigo / QuickGO
Orthologs
Databases	NCBI: entry; OMA: entry
Species	Human	Mouse
Entrez	3741	16493
Ensembl	ENSG00000130037	ENSMUSG00000045534
UniProt	P22460	Q61762
RefSeq (mRNA)	NM_002234	NM_145983
RefSeq (protein)	NP_002225	NP_666095
Location (UCSC)	Chr 12: 5.04 – 5.05 Mb	Chr 6: 126.51 – 126.51 Mb
PubMed search
- Wikidata
View/Edit Human	View/Edit Mouse

Potassium voltage-gated channel, shaker-related subfamily, member 5, also known as KCNA5 or K_{v}1.5, is a protein that in humans is encoded by the KCNA5 gene.

== Function ==
Potassium channels represent the most complex class of voltage-gated ion channels from both functional and structural standpoints. KCNA5 encodes a member of the potassium channel, voltage-gated, shaker-related subfamily. This member contains six membrane-spanning domains with a shaker-type repeat in the fourth segment. It belongs to the delayed rectifier class, the function of which could restore the resting membrane potential of beta cells after depolarization, thereby contributing to the regulation of insulin secretion. This gene is intronless, and the gene is clustered with genes KCNA1 and KCNA6 on chromosome 12. Mutations in this gene have been related to both atrial fibrillation and sudden cardiac death. KCNA5 are also key players in pulmonary vascular function, where they play a role in setting the resting membrane potential and its involvement during hypoxic pulmonary vasoconstriction.

== Interactions ==
KCNA5 has been shown to interact with DLG4, PDZ domain-containing proteins such as SAP97, and Actinin, alpha 2.

== See also ==
- Voltage-gated potassium channel
