= Tachycardia-induced cardiomyopathy =

- Other names: Arrhythmia-induced cardiomyopathy, tachycardia-mediated cardiomyopathy, tachymyopathy, chronotropic cardiomyopathy, tachycardiomyopathy
- Specialty: Cardiology
- Symptoms: shortness of breath, ankle swelling, fatigue, weight gain, palpitations, chest discomfort
- Duration: short or long term
- Causes: fast or irregular heart rhythm
- Risk factors: Prolonged tachycardia
- Treatment: antiarrythmic agents, diuretics, catheter ablation, pacemaker

Tachycardia-induced cardiomyopathy (TIC) is a disease where prolonged tachycardia (a fast heart rate) or arrhythmia (an irregular heart rhythm) causes an impairment of the myocardium (heart muscle), which can result in heart failure. People with TIC may have symptoms associated with heart failure (e.g. shortness of breath or ankle swelling) or symptoms related to the tachycardia or arrhythmia (e.g. palpitations). Though atrial fibrillation is the most common cause of TIC, several tachycardias and arrhythmias have been associated with the disease.

There are no formal diagnostic criteria for TIC. Thus, TIC is typically diagnosed when (1) tests have excluded other causes of cardiomyopathy and (2) there is improvement in myocardial function after treatment of the tachycardia or arrhythmia. Treatment of TIC can involve treating the heart failure as well as the tachycardia or arrhythmia. TIC has a good prognosis with treatment, with most people recovering some to all of their heart function.

The number of cases that occur is unclear. TIC has been reported in all age groups.

== Signs and symptoms ==
People with TIC most often present with symptoms of congestive heart failure or symptoms related to their irregular heart rhythm. Symptoms of congestive heart failure can include shortness of breath, ankle swelling, fatigue, and weight gain. Symptoms of an irregular heart rhythm can include palpitations and chest discomfort.

The timecourse of TIC is most well-studied in experiments on animals. Researchers have found that animals began to exhibit abnormal changes in blood flow after just one day of an artificially generated fast heart rate (designed to simulate a tachyarrhythmia). As their TIC progresses, these animals will have worsening heart function (e.g.: reduced cardiac output and reduced ejection fraction) for 3–5 weeks. The worsened heart function then persists at a stable state until the heart rate is returned to normal. With normal heart rates, these animals begin to demonstrate improving heart function at 1–2 days, and even complete recovery of ejection fraction at 1 month.

Human studies of the timecourse of TIC are not as robust as animal studies, though current studies suggest that the majority of people with TIC will recover a significant degree of heart function over months to years.

== Causes ==
TIC has been associated with supraventricular tachycardia (SVT), ventricular tachycardia (VT), frequent premature ventricular contractions (PVCs), rapid atrial and ventricular pacing, and left bundle branch block. The types of SVT associated with TIC include atrial fibrillation, atrial flutter, incessant atrial tachycardia, permanent junctional reciprocating tachycardia, atrioventricular reciprocating tachycardia, and atrioventricular nodal reentry tachycardia. Atrial fibrillation is the most common and well-studied etiology of TIC.

== Diagnosis ==
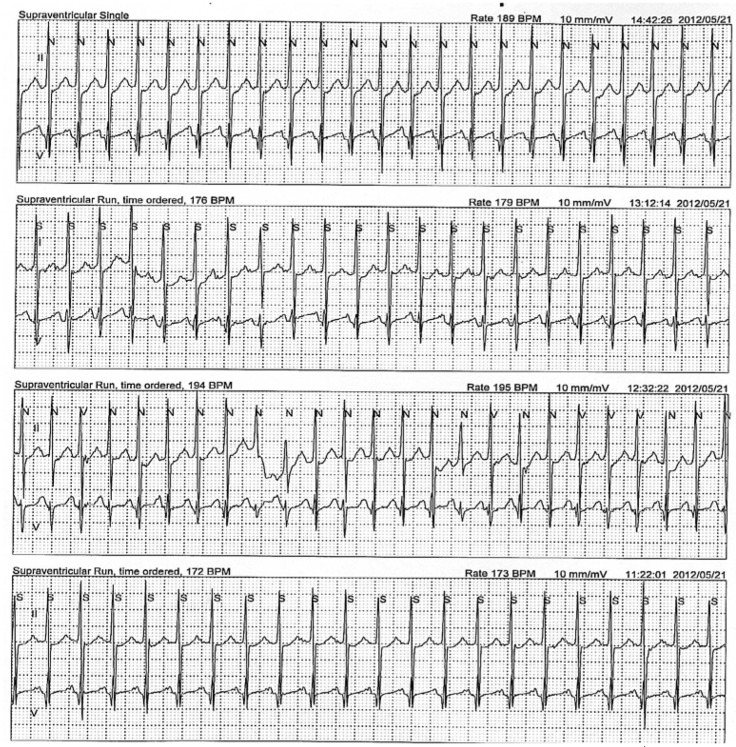
This Holter monitor strip of a 5-year-old showing atrial tachycardia. This person was eventually diagnosed with tachycardia-induced cardiomyopathy.

There are no specific diagnostic criteria for TIC, and it can be difficult to diagnose for a number of reasons. First, in patients presenting with both tachycardia and cardiomyopathy, it can be difficult to distinguish which is the causative agent. Additionally, it can occur in patients with or without underlying structural heart disease. Previously normal left ventricular ejection fraction or left ventricular systolic dysfunction out of proportion to a patient’s underlying cardiac disease can be important clues to possible TIC. The diagnosis of TIC is made after excluding other causes of cardiomyopathy and observing resolution of the left ventricular systolic dysfunction with treatment of the tachycardia.

Specific tests that can be used in the diagnosis and monitoring of TIC include:

- electrocardiography (EKG)
- Continuous cardiac rhythm monitoring (e.g. Holter monitor)
- echocardiography
- Radionuclide imaging
- Endomyocardial biopsy
- Cardiac magnetic resonance imaging (CMR)
- N-terminal pro-B-type natriuretic peptide (NT-pro BNP)

Cardiac rhythm monitors can be used to diagnose tachyarrhythmias. The most common modality used is an EKG. A continuous rhythm monitor such as a Holter monitor can be used to characterize the frequency of a tachyarrhythmia over a longer period of time. Additionally, some patients may not present to the clinical setting in an abnormal rhythm, and continuous rhythm monitor can be useful to determine if an arrhythmia is present over a longer duration of time.

To assess cardiac structure and function, echocardiography is the most commonly available and utilized modality. In addition to decreased left ventricular ejection fraction, studies indicate that patients with TIC may have a smaller left ventricular end-diastolic dimension compared to patients with idiopathic dilated cardiomyopathy. Radionuclide imaging can be used as a non-invasive test to detect myocardial ischemia. Cardiac MRI has also been used to evaluate patients with possible TIC. Late-gadolinium enhancement on cardiac MRI indicates the presence of fibrosis and scarring, and may be evidence of cardiomyopathy not due to tachycardia. A decline in serial NT-pro BNP with control of tachyarrhythmia indicates reversibility of the cardiomyopathy, which would also suggest TIC.

People with TIC display distinct changes in endomyocardial biopsies. TIC is associated with the infiltration of CD68^{+} macrophages into the myocardium while CD3^{+} T-cells are very rare. Furthermore, patients with TIC display significant fibrosis due to collagen deposition. The distribution of mitochondria has found to be altered as well, with an enrichment at the intercalated discs (EMID-sign).

TIC is likely underdiagnosed due to attribution of the tachyarrhythmia to the cardiomyopathy. Poor control of the tachyarrhythmia can result in worsening of heart failure symptoms and cardiomyopathy. Therefore, it is important to aggressively treat the tachyarrhythmia and monitor patients for resolution of left ventricular systolic dysfunction in cases of suspected TIC.

== Treatment ==
Treatment of TIC involves treating both the tachyarrhythmia and the heart failure with the goal of adequate rate control or restoration of the normal heart rhythm (aka. normal sinus rhythm) to reverse the cardiomyopathy. The treatment of the tachyarrhythmia depends on the specific arrhythmia, but possible treatment modalities include rate control, rhythm control with antiarrhythmic agents and cardioversion, radiofrequency (RF) catheter ablation, or AV node ablation with permanent pacemaker implantation.

For TIC due to atrial fibrillation, rate control, rhythm control, and RF catheter ablation can be effective to control the tachyarrhythmia and improve left ventricular systolic function. For TIC due to atrial flutter, rate control is often difficult to achieve, and RF catheter ablation has a relatively high success rate with a low risk of complications. In patients with TIC due to other types of SVT, RF catheter ablation is recommended as a first-line treatment. In patients with TIC due to VT or PVCs, both antiarrhythmics and RF catheter ablation can be used. However, the options for antiarrhythmic agents are limited because certain agents can be proarrhythmic in the setting of myocardial dysfunction in TIC. Therefore, RF catheter ablation is often a safe and effective choice for treatment VT and PVCs causing TIC. In cases where other treatment strategies fail, AV node ablation with permanent pacemaker implantation can also be used to treat the tachyarrhythmia.

The treatment of heart failure commonly involves neurohormonal blockade with beta-blockers and angiotensin convertase inhibitors (ACEIs) or angiotensin II receptor blockers (ARBs) along with symptomatic management with diuretics. Beta-blockers and ACE inhibitors can inhibit and potentially reverse the negative cardiac remodeling, which refers to structural changes in the heart, that occurs in TIC. However, the need to continue these agents after treatment of the tacharrhythmia and resolution of left ventricular systolic dysfunction remains controversial.

== Prognosis ==
The prognosis for TIC after treatment of the underlying tachyarrhythmia is generally good. Studies show that left ventricular function often improves within 1 month of treatment of the tachyarrhythmia, and normalization of the left ventricular ejection fraction occurs in the majority of patients by 3 to 4 months. In some patients however, recovery of this function can take greater than 1 year or be incomplete. In addition, despite improvement in the left ventricular ejection fraction, studies have demonstrated that patients with prior TIC continue to demonstrate signs of negative cardiac remodeling including increased left ventricular end-systolic dimension, end-systolic volume, and end-diastolic volume. Additionally, recurrence of the tachyarrhythmia in patients with a history of TIC has been associated with a rapid decline in left ventricular ejection fraction and more severe cardiomyopathy that their prior presentation, which may be a result of the negative cardiac remodeling. There have also been cases of sudden death in patients with a history of TIC, which may be associated with worse baseline left ventricular dysfunction. Given these risks, routine monitoring with clinic visits, ECG, and echocardiography is recommended.

== Epidemiology ==
The true incidence of TIC is unclear. Some studies have noted the incidence of TIC in adults with irregular heart rhythms to range from 8% to 34%. Other studies of patients with atrial fibrillation and left ventricular dysfunction estimate that 25–50% of these study participants have some degree of TIC. TIC has been reported in all age groups.

== See also ==
- Cardiomyopathy
- Congestive heart failure
