= PDLIM3 =

Protein-coding gene in the species Homo sapiens

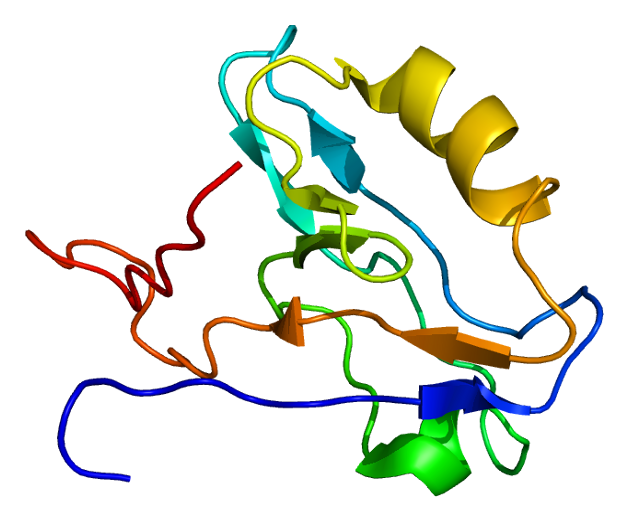

Identifiers
- Aliases: PDLIM3, ALP, PDZ and LIM domain 3
- External IDs: OMIM: 605889; MGI: 1859274; GeneCards: PDLIM3

Gene location (Human)
Chr.	Chromosome 4 (human)
Band	4q35.1	Start	185,500,660 bp
Band	4q35.1	End	185,535,507 bp

Gene location (Mouse)
Chr.	Chromosome 8 (mouse)
Band	8|8 B1.1	Start	46,338,498 bp
Band	8|8 B1.1	End	46,372,585 bp
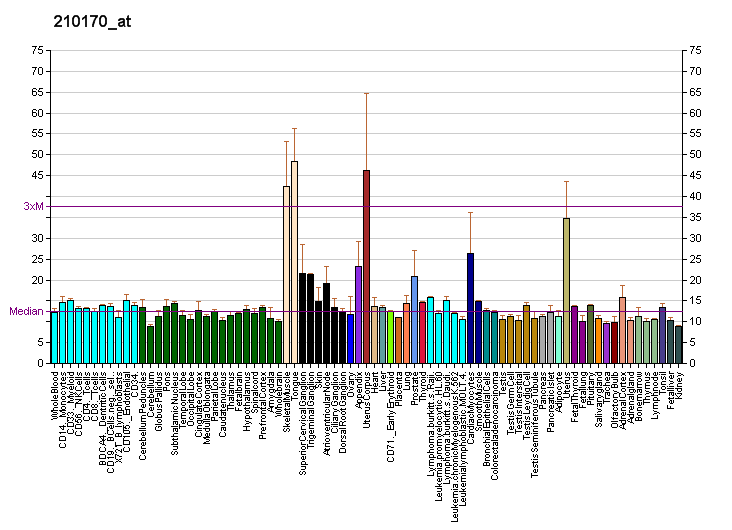

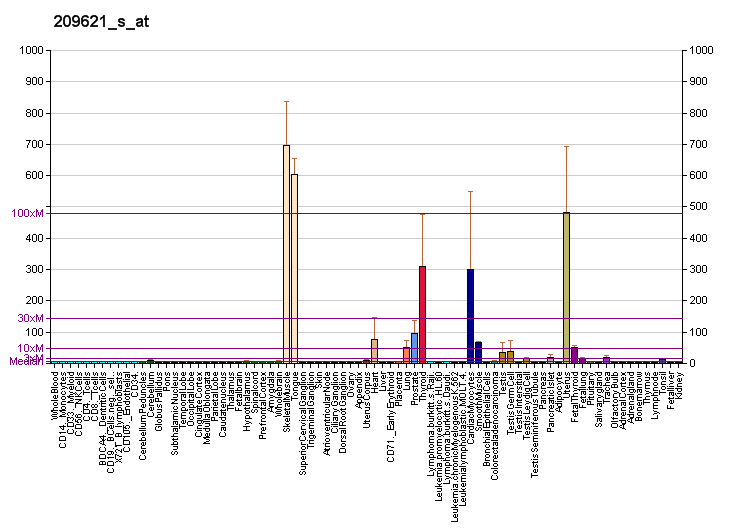
RNA expression pattern
Bgee	Human / Mouse (ortholog); Top expressed in: Skeletal muscle tissue of biceps brachii; glutes; muscle of thigh; Skeletal muscle tissue of rectus abdominis; triceps brachii muscle; gastrocnemius muscle; body of tongue; right coronary artery; thoracic diaphragm; ascending aorta / Top expressed in: ankle; muscle of thigh; triceps brachii muscle; medial head of gastrocnemius muscle; vastus lateralis muscle; temporal muscle; sternocleidomastoid muscle; tibialis anterior muscle; ascending aorta; aortic valve; More reference expression data
BioGPS	More reference expression data
Gene ontology
Molecular function	protein binding; metal ion binding; cytoskeletal protein binding; structural constituent of muscle; actin binding; muscle alpha-actinin binding
Cellular component	Z discdkac; cytoplasm; actin cytoskeleton; stress fiber; filamentous actin
Biological process	development of the heart; actin filament organization; actin cytoskeleton organization; muscle structure development
Sources:Amigo / QuickGO
Orthologs
Databases	NCBI: entry; OMA: entry
Species	Human	Mouse
Entrez	27295	53318
Ensembl	ENSG00000154553	ENSMUSG00000031636
UniProt	Q53GG5	O70209
RefSeq (mRNA)	NM_001114107; NM_001257962; NM_001257963; NM_014476	NM_016798; NM_001374652
RefSeq (protein)	NP_001107579; NP_001244891; NP_001244892; NP_055291	NP_058078; NP_001361581
Location (UCSC)	Chr 4: 185.5 – 185.54 Mb	Chr 8: 46.34 – 46.37 Mb
PubMed search
- Wikidata
View/Edit Human	View/Edit Mouse

Actin-associated LIM protein (ALP), also known as PDZ and LIM domain protein 3, is a protein that in humans is encoded by the PDLIM3 gene. ALP is highly expressed in cardiac and skeletal muscle, where it localizes to Z-discs and intercalated discs. ALP functions to enhance the crosslinking of actin by alpha-actinin-2 and also appears to be essential for right ventricular chamber formation and contractile function.

== Structure ==
ALP exists primarily as two alternatively spliced variants; a 39.2 kDa (364 amino acids) protein in skeletal muscle and a 34.3 kDa (316 amino acids) protein in cardiac muscle and smooth muscle. ALP has a N-terminal PDZ domain and a C-terminal LIM domain. In addition, the ALP subfamily contains a specific 34 amino acid domain named the ALP-like motif, containing protein kinase C consensus sequences. The PDZ domain of ALP binds to alpha actinin-2, specifically to its spectrin-like repeats. The PDZ domain is a motif composed of 80-120 amino acids with conserved four residue GLGF sequences that typically interact with C-termini of cytoskeletal proteins. The region of heterogeneity in the two isoforms is between the PDZ domain and LIM domain. ALP is localized to chromosome 4q35. It has been shown that deletion of muscleblind-like 1 in mice can alter the splicing pattern of PDLIM3.

== Function ==
Studies have shown that ALP is present at the first stage of myofibrilogenesis where it is bound to alpha actinin-2, and this association remains intact in mature myofibrils where ALP is localized to Z-discs and intercalated discs. Alpha actinin-2 is however not required for targeting ALP to Z-lines. Studies in ALP knockout mice have shown that ALP facilitates the cross-linking of actin filaments by alpha actinin-2, and absence of ALP induces abnormal right ventricular chamber formation, dysplasia and cardiomyopathy. Further studies using right ventricular epicardial systolic strain and geometric remodeling analysis in these animals unveiled that absence of ALP diminishes right ventricular contractile function and alters the pattern of cardiac hypertrophic remodeling. Two studies using integrative genomic approaches to investigate genetic modifiers of collagen deposition or intrinsic aerobic running capacity (ARC) have mapped PDLIM3 to respective quantitative trait loci, suggesting that ALP may be involved in molecular networks related to these cardiac phenomena.

== Clinical significance ==
Chromosome 4 pericentric inversion has been observed in 10 patients, with associated cardiac defects linked to terminal 4q35.1 deletions, which may affect PDLIM3.

== Interactions ==
ALP interacts with:

- Alpha-actinin-2
- Beta-catenin
