= LDB3 =

Protein-coding gene in the species Homo sapiens

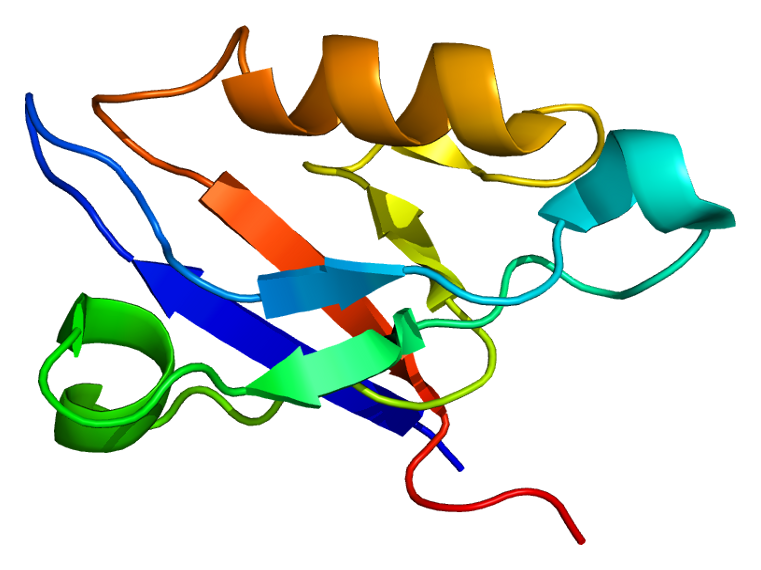

Identifiers
- Aliases: LDB3, CMD1C, CMPD3, CYPHER, LDB3Z1, LDB3Z4, LVNC3, MFM4, ORACLE, PDLIM6, ZASP, CMH24, LIM domain binding 3
- External IDs: OMIM: 605906; MGI: 1344412; GeneCards: LDB3
Available structures
PDB	Ortholog search: PDBe RCSB
PDB	List of PDB id codes 4YDP

Gene location (Human)
Chr.	Chromosome 10 (human)
Band	10q23.2	Start	86,666,785 bp
Band	10q23.2	End	86,736,072 bp

Gene location (Mouse)
Chr.	Chromosome 14 (mouse)
Band	14|14 B	Start	34,248,560 bp
Band	14|14 B	End	34,310,639 bp
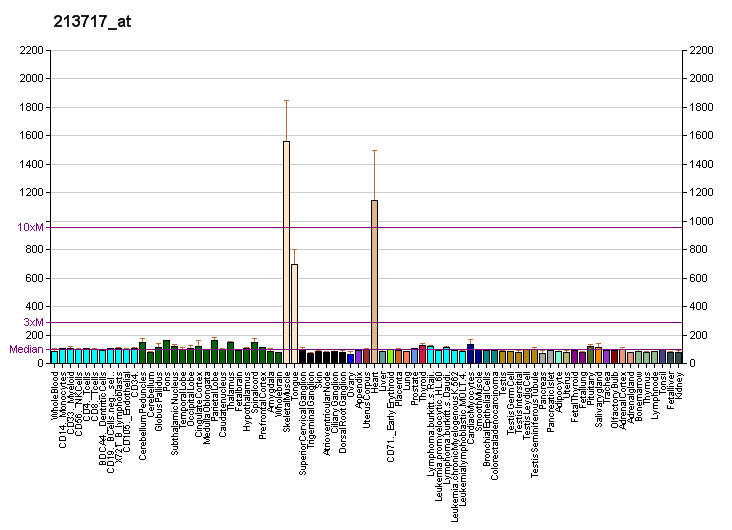

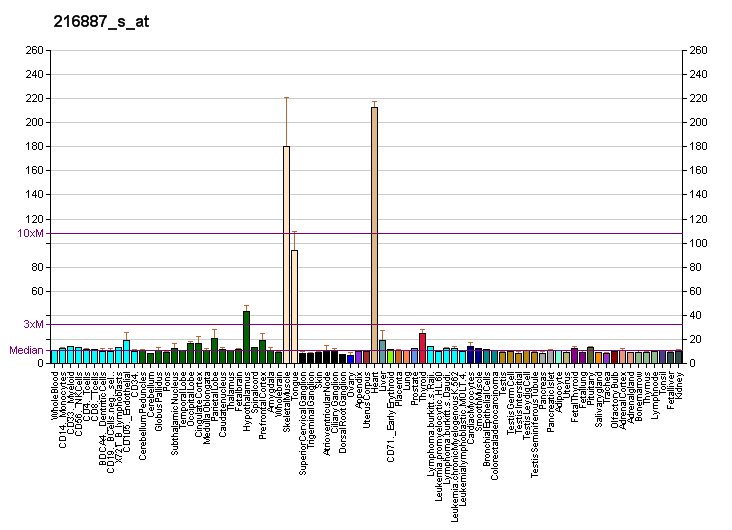

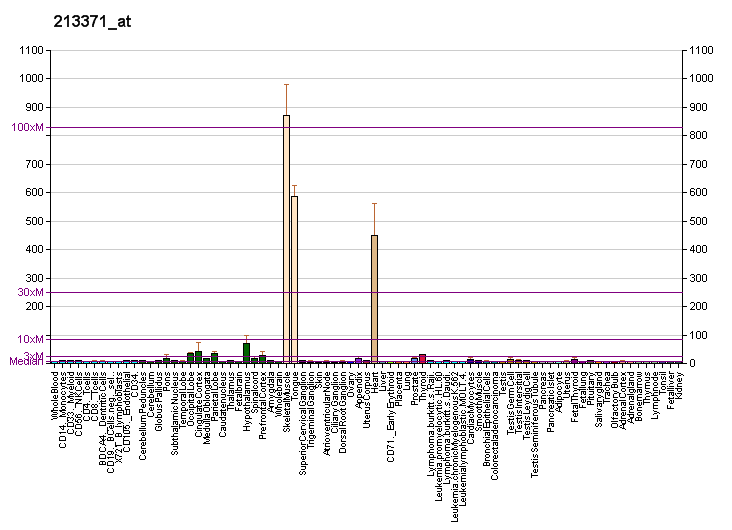
RNA expression pattern
Bgee	Human / Mouse (ortholog); Top expressed in: Skeletal muscle tissue of biceps brachii; muscle of thigh; apex of heart; body of tongue; vastus lateralis muscle; Skeletal muscle tissue of rectus abdominis; left ventricle; vena cava; myocardium of left ventricle; atrium / Top expressed in: triceps brachii muscle; muscle of thigh; medial head of gastrocnemius muscle; temporal muscle; sternocleidomastoid muscle; ankle; quadriceps femoris muscle; tibialis anterior muscle; digastric muscle; vastus lateralis muscle; More reference expression data
BioGPS	More reference expression data
Gene ontology
Molecular function	cytoskeletal protein binding; protein binding; metal ion binding; muscle alpha-actinin binding; protein kinase C binding; actin binding
Cellular component	cytoplasm; perinuclear region of cytoplasm; cell projection; pseudopodium; Z discdkac; cytoskeleton; stress fiber; filamentous actin
Biological process	sarcomere organization; development of the heart; actin cytoskeleton organization; muscle structure development
Sources:Amigo / QuickGO
Orthologs
Databases	NCBI: entry; OMA: entry
Species	Human	Mouse
Entrez	11155	24131
Ensembl	ENSG00000122367	ENSMUSG00000021798
UniProt	O75112	Q9JKS4
RefSeq (mRNA)	NM_001080114; NM_001080115; NM_001080116; NM_001171610; NM_001171611 NM_007078; NM_001368063; NM_001368064; NM_001368065; NM_001368066; NM_001368067; NM_001368068	NM_001039071; NM_001039072; NM_001039073; NM_001039074; NM_001039075 NM_001039076; NM_011918
RefSeq (protein)	NP_001073583; NP_001073584; NP_001073585; NP_001165081; NP_001165082 NP_009009; NP_001354992; NP_001354993; NP_001354994; NP_001354995; NP_001354996; NP_001354997	NP_001034160; NP_001034161; NP_001034162; NP_001034163; NP_001034164 NP_001034165; NP_036048
Location (UCSC)	Chr 10: 86.67 – 86.74 Mb	Chr 14: 34.25 – 34.31 Mb
PubMed search
- Wikidata
View/Edit Human	View/Edit Mouse

LIM domain binding 3 (LDB3), also known as Z-band alternatively spliced PDZ-motif (ZASP), is a protein which in humans is encoded by the LDB3 gene. ZASP belongs to the Enigma subfamily of proteins and stabilizes the sarcomere (the basic units of muscles) during contraction, through interactions with actin in cardiac and skeletal muscles. Mutations in the ZASP gene has been associated with several muscular diseases.

== Structure ==
ZASP is a PDZ domain-containing protein. PDZ motifs are modular protein-protein interaction domains consisting of 80-120 amino acid residues. PDZ domain-containing proteins interact with each other in cytoskeletal assembly or with other proteins involved in targeting and clustering of membrane proteins. ZASP interacts with alpha-actinin-2 through its N-terminal PDZ domain and with protein kinase C via its C-terminal LIM domains. The LIM domain is a cysteine-rich motif defined by 50-60 amino acids containing two zinc-binding modules. This protein also interacts with all three members of the myozenin family.

Human ZASP can exist in cardiac and skeletal cells as six distinct isoforms, based on alternative splicing of 16 exons. There are 2 ZASP short forms (Uniprot ID: O75112-6, 31.0 kDa, 283 amino acids; and Uniprot ID: O75112-5, 35.6 kDa, 330 amino acids); and 4 ZASP long forms (Uniprot ID: O75112-4, 42.8 kDa, 398 amino acids; Uniprot ID: O75112-3, 50.6 kDa, 470 amino acids; Uniprot ID: O75112-2, 66.6 kDa, 617 amino acids; and Uniprot ID: O75112, 77.1 kDa, 727 amino acids). All ZASP isoforms have an N-terminal PDZ domain; internal, conserved sequences known as ZASP-like motifs (ZMs); and the four long isoforms have three C-terminal LIM domains.

== Function ==
ZASP functions to maintain structural integrity of sarcomeres during contraction, and has been shown to be involved in protein kinase A signaling. ZASP has also been shown to co-activate α5β1 integrins along with the protein TLN1.

== Clinical significance ==
Mutations in ZASP have been associated with myofibrillar myopathy, dilated cardiomyopathy, arrhythmogenic right ventricular cardiomyopathy, noncompaction cardiomyopathy, and muscular dystrophy.

== Interactions ==
The PDZ domain of ZASP binds the C-terminus of alpha actinin-2 and ZMs bind the rod domain of alpha actinin-2. The LIM domains have been shown to interact with protein kinase C. The cardiac-specific region of ZASP encoded by exon 4 includes a ZP motif and binds a regulatory subunit of protein kinase A.

== See also ==
- Dilated cardiomyopathy
- Noncompaction cardiomyopathy
