= Tropomodulin 1 =

Protein-coding gene in the species Homo sapiens

TMOD1

Identifiers
- Aliases: TMOD1, D9S57E, ETMOD, TMOD, tropomodulin 1
- External IDs: OMIM: 190930; MGI: 98775; GeneCards: TMOD1
Available structures
PDB	Ortholog search: PDBe RCSB
PDB	List of PDB id codes 4PKG, 4PKH, 4PKI, 4Z8G, 4Z94

Gene location (Mouse)
Chr.	Chromosome 4 (mouse)
Band	4 B1|4 24.49 cM	Start	46,038,935 bp
Band	4 B1|4 24.49 cM	End	46,116,032 bp
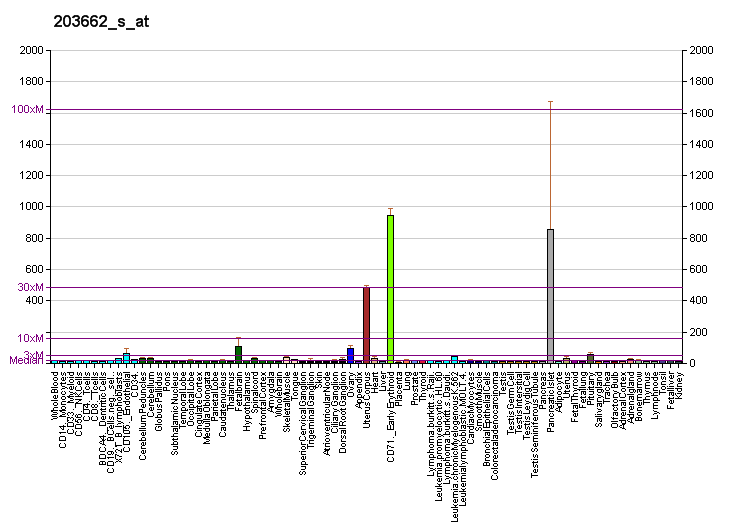

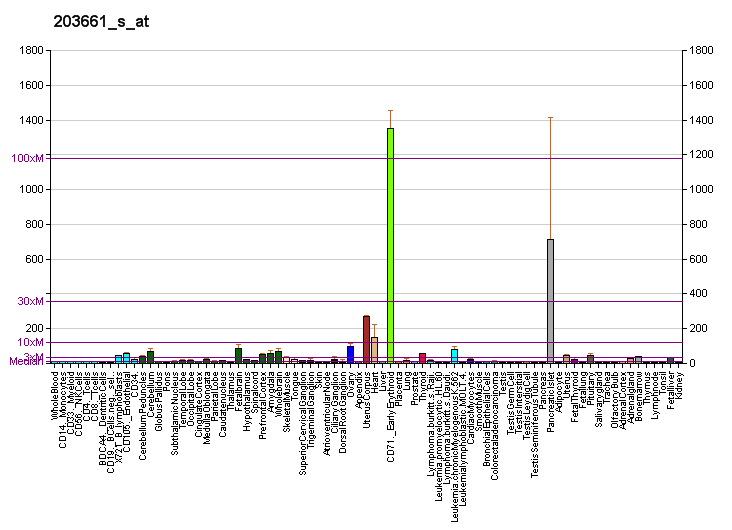
RNA expression pattern
Bgee	Human / Mouse (ortholog); Top expressed in: gastrocnemius muscle; gastric mucosa; spinal ganglia; left ventricle; skeletal muscle tissue; body of tongue; quadriceps femoris muscle; vastus lateralis muscle; deltoid muscle; trigeminal ganglion / Top expressed in: quadriceps femoris muscle; right ventricle; muscle of thigh; myocardium of ventricle; gastrocnemius muscle; temporal muscle; utricle; skeletal muscle tissue; medial head of gastrocnemius muscle; sternocleidomastoid muscle; More reference expression data
BioGPS	More reference expression data
Gene ontology
Molecular function	actin filament binding; actin binding; tropomyosin binding
Cellular component	membrane; COP9 signalosome; cytoskeleton; cytosol; cortical cytoskeleton; cytoplasm; sarcomere; myofibril; actin filament; striated muscle thin filament
Biological process	adult locomotory behavior; lens fiber cell development; muscle filament sliding; pointed-end actin filament capping; muscle contraction; actin filament organization; myofibril assembly
Sources:Amigo / QuickGO
Orthologs
Databases	NCBI: entry
Species	Human	Mouse
Entrez	7111	21916
Ensembl	n/a	ENSMUSG00000028328
UniProt	P28289	P49813
RefSeq (mRNA)	NM_003275; NM_001166116	NM_021883
RefSeq (protein)	NP_001159588; NP_003266	NP_068683
Location (UCSC)	n/a	Chr 4: 46.04 – 46.12 Mb
PubMed search
- Wikidata
View/Edit Human	View/Edit Mouse

Tropomodulin-1 is a protein that in humans is encoded by the TMOD1 gene.
