= Alpha-actinin-2 =

Protein found in humans

ACTN2
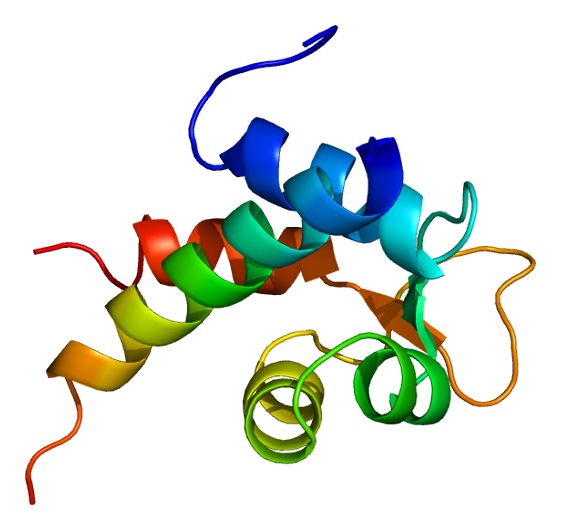

Identifiers
- Aliases: ACTN2, CMD1AA, CMH23, actinin alpha 2, MYOCOZ, MPD6
- External IDs: OMIM: 102573; MGI: 109192; GeneCards: ACTN2
Available structures
PDB	Ortholog search: PDBe RCSB
PDB	List of PDB id codes 1H8B, 1HCI, 1QUU, 4D1E, 5A37, 5A36, 5A38, 5A4B

Gene location (Human)
Chr.	Chromosome 1 (human)
Band	1q43	Start	236,664,141 bp
Band	1q43	End	236,764,631 bp

Gene location (Mouse)
Chr.	Chromosome 13 (mouse)
Band	13 A1|13 4.54 cM	Start	12,284,312 bp
Band	13 A1|13 4.54 cM	End	12,355,641 bp
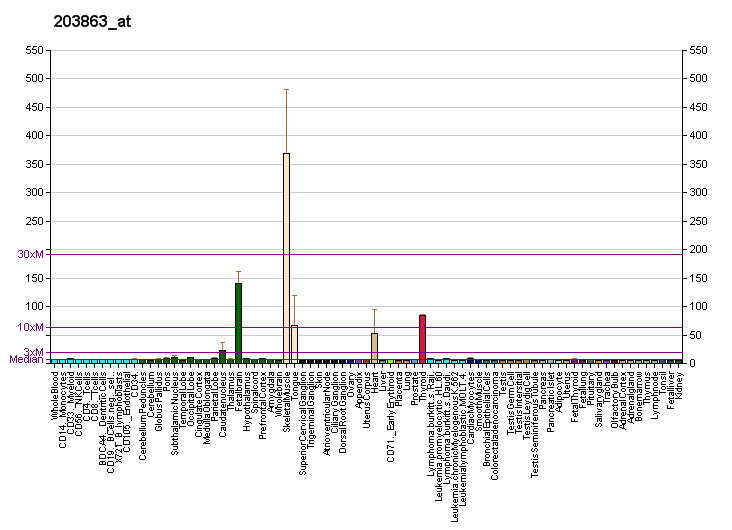

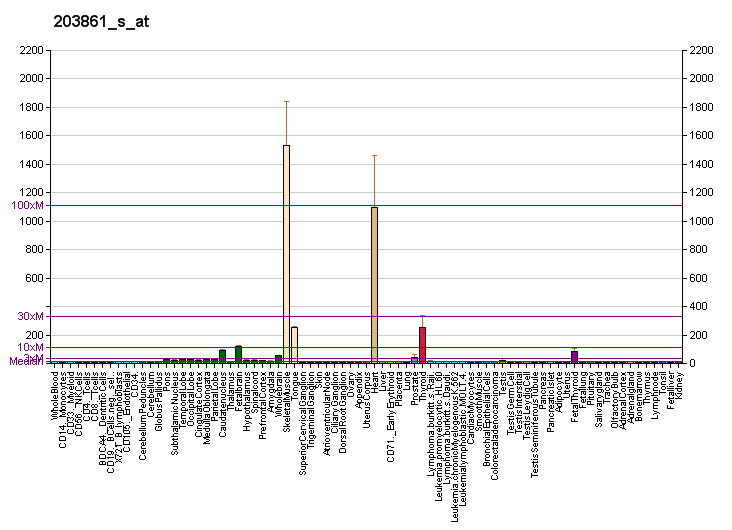

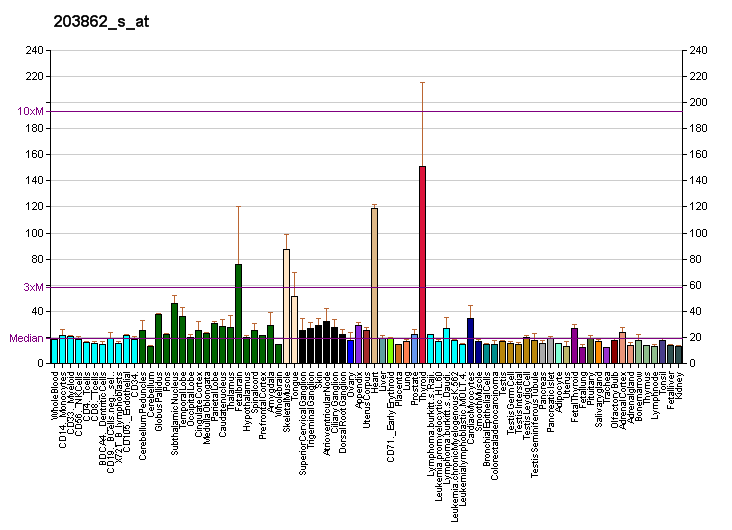
RNA expression pattern
Bgee	Human / Mouse (ortholog); Top expressed in: Skeletal muscle tissue of rectus abdominis; Skeletal muscle tissue of biceps brachii; muscle of thigh; apex of heart; glutes; gastrocnemius muscle; right ventricle; triceps brachii muscle; myocardium of left ventricle; deltoid muscle / Top expressed in: soleus muscle; ankle; myocardium of ventricle; extraocular muscle; digastric muscle; right ventricle; cardiac muscles; temporal muscle; tibialis anterior muscle; sternocleidomastoid muscle; More reference expression data
BioGPS	More reference expression data
Gene ontology
Molecular function	calcium ion binding; protein dimerization activity; protein homodimerization activity; transmembrane transporter binding; protein domain specific binding; titin Z domain binding; LIM domain binding; titin binding; metal ion binding; cytoskeletal protein binding; integrin binding; actin filament binding; protein binding; nuclear receptor coactivator activity; identical protein binding; FATZ binding; actin binding; phosphatidylinositol-4,5-bisphosphate binding; structural constituent of muscle
Cellular component	cytoplasm; cytosol; pseudopodium; focal adhesion; filopodium; plasma membrane; sarcomere; dendritic spine; extracellular region; Z discdkac; cortical actin cytoskeleton; actin filament; extracellular exosome; cytoskeleton; platelet alpha granule lumen; postsynaptic density membrane; glutamatergic synapse; postsynaptic density, intracellular component
Biological process	positive regulation of cation channel activity; regulation of apoptotic process; muscle contraction; positive regulation of potassium ion transport; phospholipase C-activating angiotensin-activated signaling pathway; cardiac muscle cell development; regulation of membrane potential; platelet degranulation; actin filament uncapping; MAPK cascade; focal adhesion assembly; negative regulation of protein localization to cell surface; positive regulation of signaling receptor activity; cell adhesion; negative regulation of potassium ion transmembrane transporter activity; negative regulation of potassium ion transport; regulation of nucleic acid-templated transcription; microspike assembly; positive regulation of endocytic recycling; muscle filament sliding; protein homotetramerization; sarcomere organization; positive regulation of potassium ion transmembrane transporter activity; protein localization to plasma membrane; positive regulation of nucleic acid-templated transcription; regulation of NMDA receptor activity
Sources:Amigo / QuickGO
Orthologs
Databases	NCBI: entry; OMA: entry
Species	Human	Mouse
Entrez	88	11472
Ensembl	ENSG00000077522	ENSMUSG00000052374
UniProt	P35609	Q9JI91
RefSeq (mRNA)	NM_001103; NM_001278343; NM_001278344	NM_033268
RefSeq (protein)	NP_001094; NP_001265272; NP_001265273	NP_150371
Location (UCSC)	Chr 1: 236.66 – 236.76 Mb	Chr 13: 12.28 – 12.36 Mb
PubMed search
- Wikidata
View/Edit Human	View/Edit Mouse

Alpha-actinin-2 is a protein which in humans is encoded by the ACTN2 gene. This gene encodes an alpha-actinin isoform that is expressed in both skeletal and cardiac muscles and functions to anchor myofibrillar actin thin filaments and titin to Z-discs.

== Structure ==
Alpha-actinin-2 is a 103.8 kDa protein composed of 894 amino acids. Each molecule is rod-shaped (35 nm in length) and it homodimerizes in an anti-parallel fashion. Each monomer has an N-terminal actin-binding region composed of two calponin homology domains, two C-terminal EF hand domains, and four tandem spectrin-like repeats form the rod domain in the central region of the molecule. The high-resolution crystal structure of human alpha-actinin 2 at 3.5 Å was recently resolved. Alpha actinins belong to the spectrin gene superfamily which represents a diverse group of actin-binding cytoskeletal proteins, including spectrin, dystrophin, utrophin and fimbrin. Skeletal, cardiac, and smooth muscle isoforms are localized to the Z-disc and analogous dense bodies, where they help anchor the myofibrillar actin filaments. Alpha-actinin 2 has been shown to interact with KCNA5, DLG1, DISC1, MYOZ1, GRIN2B, ADAM12, ACTN3, MYPN, PDLIM3, PKN, MYOT, TTN, NMDAR, SYNPO2, LDB3, and FATZ.

== Function ==
The primary function of alpha-actinin-2 is to crosslink filamentous actin molecules and titin molecules from adjoining sarcomeres at Z-discs, a function that is modulated by phospholipids. It is clear from studies by Hampton et al. that this crosslinking can assume a variety of conformations, with preferences for 60° and 120° angles. Alpha-actinin-2 also functions in docking signalling molecules at Z-discs, and additional studies have also implicated alpha-actinin-2 in the binding of cardiac ion channels, K_{v}1.5 in particular.

== Clinical significance ==
Mutations in ACTN2 are associated with hypertrophic cardiomyopathy, as well as dilated cardiomyopathy and endocardial fibroelastosis. The diverse functions of alpha-actinin-2 are reflected in the diverse clinical presentation of patients carrying ACTN2 mutations.
