= PPP3CA =

Protein-coding gene in the species Homo sapiens

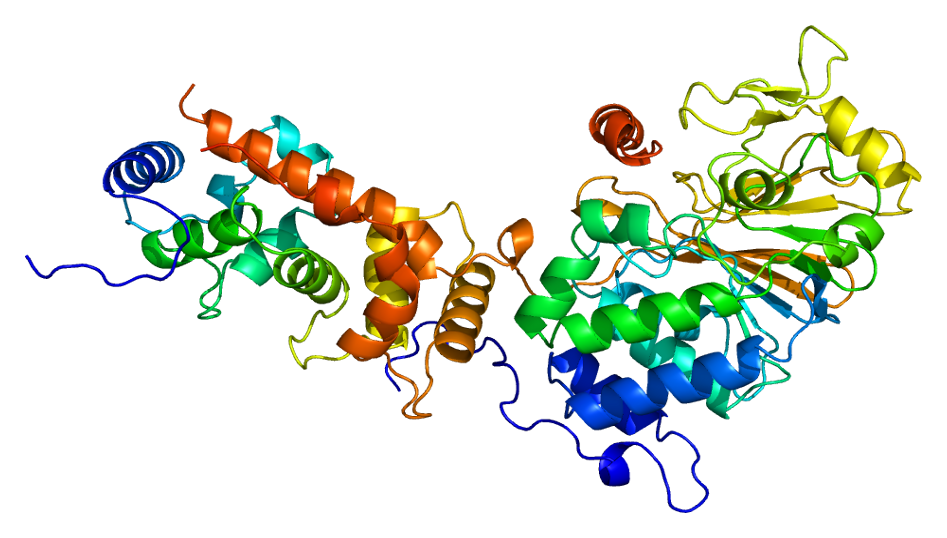

Identifiers
- Aliases: PPP3CA, CALN, CALNA, CALNA1, CCN1, CNA1, PPP2B, protein phosphatase 3 catalytic subunit alpha, IECEE, IECEE1, ACCIID, DEE91
- External IDs: OMIM: 114105; MGI: 107164; GeneCards: PPP3CA
Available structures
PDB	Ortholog search: PDBe RCSB
PDB	List of PDB id codes 1AUI, 1M63, 1MF8, 2JOG, 2JZI, 2P6B, 2R28, 2W73, 3LL8, 4F0Z, 4Q5U, 5C1V
Enzyme activity
EC #	BRENDA	ExPASy	KEGG	MetaCyc
3.1.3.16	↗	↗	↗	↗

Gene location (Human)
Chr.	Chromosome 4 (human)
Band	4q24	Start	101,023,409 bp
Band	4q24	End	101,348,278 bp

Gene location (Mouse)
Chr.	Chromosome 3 (mouse)
Band	3|3 G3	Start	136,375,885 bp
Band	3|3 G3	End	136,643,488 bp
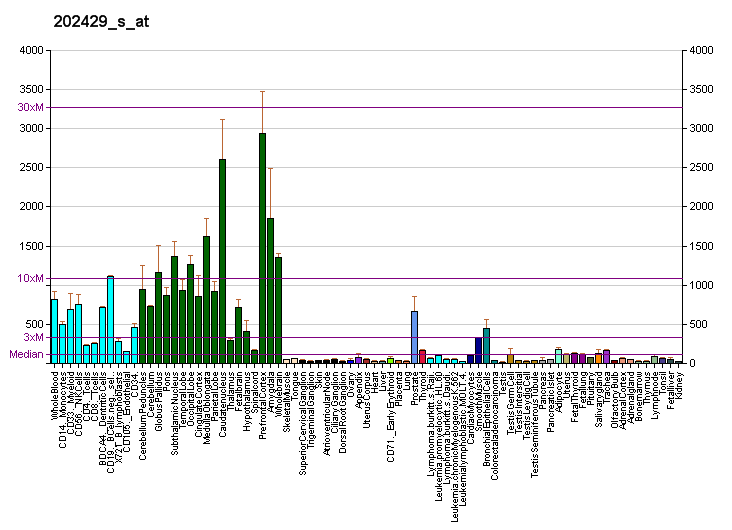

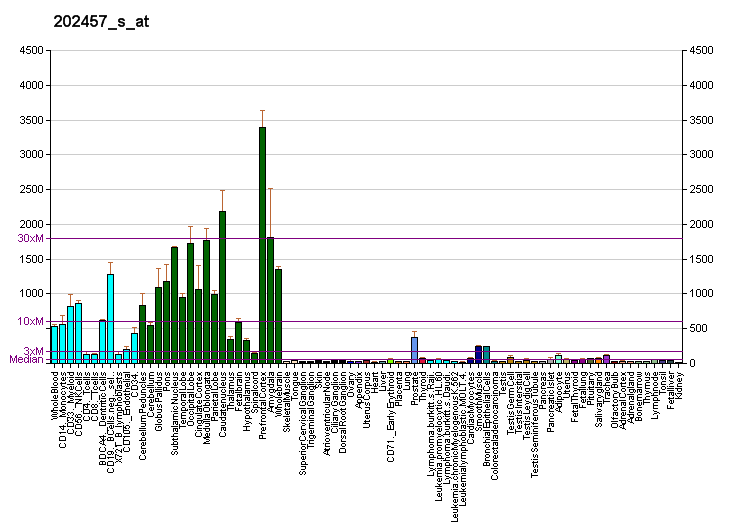

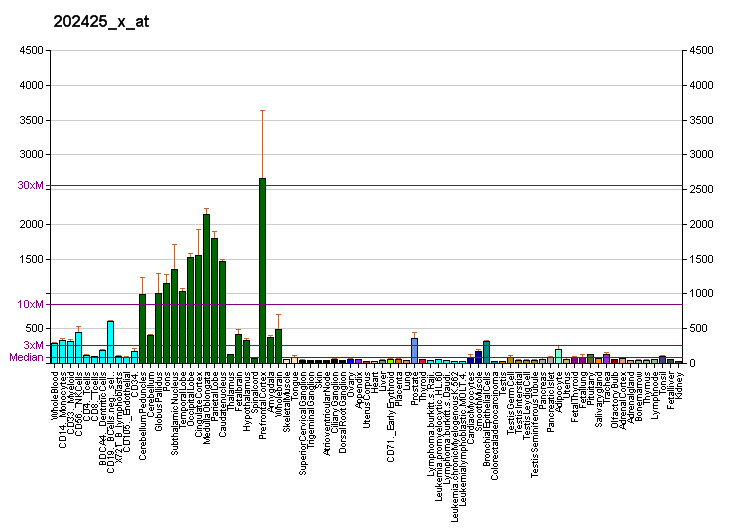
RNA expression pattern
Bgee	Human / Mouse (ortholog); Top expressed in: Brodmann area 23; endothelial cell; middle temporal gyrus; Region I of hippocampus proper; postcentral gyrus; Brodmann area 46; entorhinal cortex; orbitofrontal cortex; external globus pallidus; pons / Top expressed in: olfactory tubercle; hippocampus proper; lateral septal nucleus; globus pallidus; nucleus accumbens; anterior amygdaloid area; lobe of cerebellum; subiculum; Region I of hippocampus proper; prefrontal cortex; More reference expression data
BioGPS	More reference expression data
Gene ontology
Molecular function	calcium ion binding; phosphoprotein phosphatase activity; protein dimerization activity; protein serine/threonine phosphatase activity; metal ion binding; calmodulin binding; protein binding; protein heterodimerization activity; enzyme binding; calcium-dependent protein serine/threonine phosphatase activity; hydrolase activity; cyclosporin A binding; calmodulin-dependent protein phosphatase activity
Cellular component	membrane; plasma membrane; calcineurin complex; nucleoplasm; Z discdkac; mitochondrion; sarcolemma; nucleus; cytosol; cytoplasm; cytoplasmic side of plasma membrane; dendritic spine; slit diaphragm; cell projection; synapse; Schaffer collateral - CA1 synapse; glutamatergic synapse
Biological process	multicellular organismal response to stress; negative regulation of insulin secretion; protein import into nucleus; transition between fast and slow fiber; negative regulation of chromatin binding; response to amphetamine; modulation of chemical synaptic transmission; positive regulation of DNA-binding transcription factor activity; response to calcium ion; Fc-epsilon receptor signaling pathway; cardiac muscle hypertrophy in response to stress; negative regulation of dendrite morphogenesis; skeletal muscle fiber development; positive regulation of cardiac muscle hypertrophy in response to stress; excitatory postsynaptic potential; T cell activation; cellular response to glucose stimulus; calcium ion transport; calcium-mediated signaling; dephosphorylation; positive regulation of transcription by RNA polymerase II; Wnt signaling pathway, calcium modulating pathway; positive regulation of cardiac muscle hypertrophy; positive regulation of gene expression; negative regulation of gene expression; negative regulation of production of miRNAs involved in gene silencing by miRNA; positive regulation of connective tissue replacement; positive regulation of endocytosis; G1/S transition of mitotic cell cycle; protein dephosphorylation; calcineurin-NFAT signaling cascade; positive regulation of calcineurin-NFAT signaling cascade; brain development; positive regulation of cell migration; skeletal muscle tissue regeneration; positive regulation of cell adhesion; calcineurin-mediated signaling; postsynaptic modulation of chemical synaptic transmission; ageing; peptidyl-serine dephosphorylation
Sources:Amigo / QuickGO
Orthologs
Databases	NCBI: entry; OMA: entry
Species	Human	Mouse
Entrez	5530	19055
Ensembl	ENSG00000138814	ENSMUSG00000028161
UniProt	Q08209	P63328
RefSeq (mRNA)	NM_001130692; NM_000944; NM_001130691	NM_001293622; NM_008913
RefSeq (protein)	NP_000935; NP_001124163; NP_001124164	NP_001280551; NP_032939
Location (UCSC)	Chr 4: 101.02 – 101.35 Mb	Chr 3: 136.38 – 136.64 Mb
PubMed search
- Wikidata
View/Edit Human	View/Edit Mouse

Serine/threonine-protein phosphatase 2B catalytic subunit alpha isoform (PP2BA) is a protein that in humans is encoded by the PPP3CA gene.
