= MYOZ1 =

Protein-coding gene in the species Homo sapiens

Identifiers
- Aliases: MYOZ1, CS-2, FATZ, MYOZ, myozenin 1
- External IDs: OMIM: 605603; MGI: 1929471; GeneCards: MYOZ1

Gene location (Human)
Chr.	Chromosome 10 (human)
Band	10q22.2	Start	73,631,612 bp
Band	10q22.2	End	73,641,474 bp

Gene location (Mouse)
Chr.	Chromosome 14 (mouse)
Band	14|14 A3	Start	20,699,175 bp
Band	14|14 A3	End	20,706,608 bp
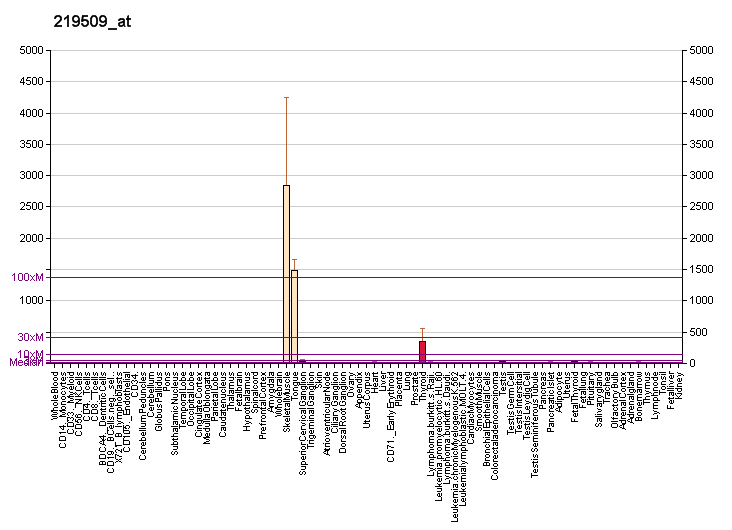
RNA expression pattern
Bgee	Human / Mouse (ortholog); Top expressed in: muscle of thigh; Skeletal muscle tissue of rectus abdominis; gastrocnemius muscle; biceps brachii; vastus lateralis muscle; Skeletal muscle tissue of biceps brachii; triceps brachii muscle; glutes; thoracic diaphragm; deltoid muscle / Top expressed in: temporal muscle; triceps brachii muscle; muscle of thigh; sternocleidomastoid muscle; medial head of gastrocnemius muscle; digastric muscle; ankle; quadriceps femoris muscle; tibialis anterior muscle; extensor digitorum longus muscle; More reference expression data
BioGPS	More reference expression data
Gene ontology
Molecular function	FATZ binding; protein binding; actin binding; telethonin binding; protein serine/threonine phosphatase inhibitor activity
Cellular component	cell projection; nucleus; pseudopodium; actin cytoskeleton; Z discdkac
Biological process	myofibril assembly; negative regulation of transcription by RNA polymerase II; skeletal muscle tissue development; negative regulation of phosphoprotein phosphatase activity; negative regulation of skeletal muscle tissue regeneration; skeletal muscle fiber adaptation; sarcomere organization; negative regulation of calcineurin-NFAT signaling cascade
Sources:Amigo / QuickGO
Orthologs
Databases	NCBI: entry; OMA: entry
Species	Human	Mouse
Entrez	58529	59011
Ensembl	ENSG00000177791	ENSMUSG00000068697
UniProt	Q9NP98	Q9JK37
RefSeq (mRNA)	NM_021245	NM_021508
RefSeq (protein)	NP_067068	NP_067483
Location (UCSC)	Chr 10: 73.63 – 73.64 Mb	Chr 14: 20.7 – 20.71 Mb
PubMed search
- Wikidata
View/Edit Human	View/Edit Mouse

Myozenin-1 is a protein that in humans is encoded by the MYOZ1 gene.

== Interactions ==
MYOZ1 has been shown to interact with Telethonin, FLNC and Actinin, alpha 2.
