= ANKRD1 =

Protein-coding gene in the species Homo sapiens

Identifiers
- Aliases: ANKRD1, ALRP, C-193, CARP, CVARP, MCARP, bA320F15.2, ankyrin repeat domain 1
- External IDs: OMIM: 609599; MGI: 1097717; GeneCards: ANKRD1

Gene location (Human)
Chr.	Chromosome 10 (human)
Band	10q23.31	Start	90,912,096 bp
Band	10q23.31	End	90,921,087 bp
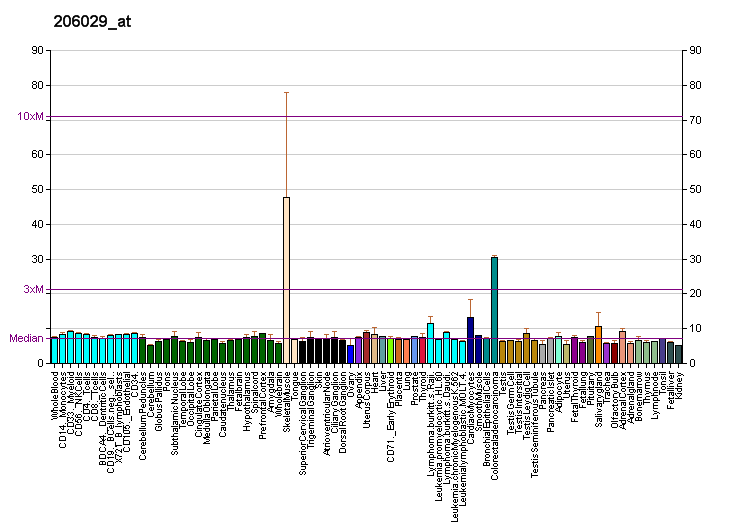
RNA expression pattern
Bgee	Human / Mouse (ortholog); Top expressed in: apex of heart; right auricle of heart; left ventricle; myocardium of left ventricle; right lung; vena cava; muscle of thigh; cardiac muscle tissue of right atrium; gastrocnemius muscle; glutes / n/a; More reference expression data
BioGPS	More reference expression data
Gene ontology
Molecular function	DNA binding; transcription coactivator activity; R-SMAD binding; transcription corepressor activity; p53 binding; histone deacetylase binding; titin binding; protein binding; RNA polymerase II-specific DNA-binding transcription factor binding; transcription factor binding
Cellular component	cytoplasm; cytosol; transcription regulator complex; nucleoplasm; myofibril; nucleus; fibrillar center; I band
Biological process	response to muscle stretch; cellular response to transforming growth factor beta stimulus; regulation of transcription by RNA polymerase II; cellular response to tumor necrosis factor; cellular response to organic cyclic compound; cardiac muscle tissue morphogenesis; negative regulation of transcription by RNA polymerase II; cellular response to mechanical stimulus; cellular response to interleukin-1; positive regulation of protein secretion; positive regulation of neuron projection development; positive regulation of apoptotic process; positive regulation of DNA damage response, signal transduction by p53 class mediator; cellular response to lipopolysaccharide; sarcomere organization; cellular response to hypoxia; negative regulation of DNA biosynthetic process; positive regulation of transcription by RNA polymerase II; regulation of lipid metabolic process; skeletal muscle cell differentiation; myoblast differentiation; transcription by RNA polymerase II; positive regulation of nucleic acid-templated transcription; skeletal muscle tissue development
Sources:Amigo / QuickGO
Orthologs
Databases	NCBI: entry; OMA: entry
Species	Human	Mouse
Entrez	27063	107765
Ensembl	ENSG00000148677	ENSMUSG00000024803
UniProt	Q15327	Q9CR42
RefSeq (mRNA)	NM_014391	NM_013468
RefSeq (protein)	NP_055206	NP_038496
Location (UCSC)	Chr 10: 90.91 – 90.92 Mb	n/a
PubMed search
- Wikidata
View/Edit Human	View/Edit Mouse

Ankyrin repeat domain-containing protein 1, or Cardiac ankyrin repeat protein is a protein that in humans is encoded by the ANKRD1 gene also known as CARP. CARP is highly expressed in cardiac and skeletal muscle, and is a transcription factor involved in development and under conditions of stress. CARP has been implicated in several diseases, including dilated cardiomyopathy, hypertrophic cardiomyopathy, and several skeletal muscle myopathies.

== Structure ==
Human cardiac ankyrin repeat protein is a 36.2kDa protein composed of 319 amino acids., though in cardiomyocytes, CARP can exist as multiple alternatively spliced forms. CARP contains five tandem ankyrin repeats. Studies have shown that CARP can homodimerize. Studies have also shown that CARP is N-terminally, post-translationally cleaved by calpain-3 in skeletal muscle, suggesting alternate bioactive forms of CARP exist. CARP has been localized to nuclei and Z-discs in animal and human muscle cells, and at intercalated discs in human cardiac muscle cells.

== Function ==
CARP was originally identified as a YB-1-associating, cardiac-restricted transcription co-repressor in the homeobox NKX2-5 pathway that is involved in cardiac ventricular chamber specification, maturation and morphogenesis, and whose mRNA levels are exquisitely sensitive to Doxorubicin, mediated through a hydrogen peroxide/ERK/p38MAP kinase-dependent as well as M-CAT cis-element-dependent mechanism. Subsequent studies showed that CARP expression in cardiomyocytes is regulated by alpha-adrenergic signaling, in part via the transcription factor GATA4. An additional study showed that beta-adrenergic signaling via protein kinase A and CaM kinase induces the expression of CARP, and that CARP may have a negative effect on contractile function. CARP has also been identified as a transcriptional co-activator of tumor suppressor protein p53 for stimulating gene expression in muscle; p53 was found to be an upstream effector of CARP via upregulation of the proximal ANKRD1 promoter. CARP has a relatively short half-life being longer in cardiomyocytes than endothelial cells; and CARP is degraded by the 26S proteasome via a PEST degron.

In animal models of disease and injury, CARP has been characterized to be a stress-inducible myofibrillar protein. CARP has been shown to play a role in skeletal muscle structure remodeling, and repair, being expressed in skeletal muscle near myotendinous junctions, and in vascular smooth muscle cells, as a downstream target of TGF-beta/Smad signaling in response to balloon injury and atherosclerotic plaques. Further studies have identified a role for CARP in initiation and regulation of arteriogenesis. Decreased expression of CARP in cardiac cells within the ischemic region was detected in a rat model of ischemic injury, and was thought to be linked to the induction of GADD153, an apoptosis-related gene. In cardiomyocytes treated with doxorubicin, a model of anthracycline-induced cardiomyopathy, CARP mRNA and protein levels were depleted, myofilament gene transcription was attenuated and sarcomeres showed significant disarray.

In a transgenic mouse model of cardiac-specific overexpression of CARP, mice exhibited normal physiology at baseline, but were protected against pathological cardiac hypertrophy induced via pressure-overload or isoproterenol, which could be attributed to the downregulation of the ERK1/2, MEK and TGFbeta-1 pathways. Another study demonstrated that adenoviral overexpression of CARP in cardiomyocytes enhances cardiac hypertrophy induced by Angiotensin II or pressure-overload and promotes cardiomyocyte apoptosis via p53 activation and mitochondrial dysfunction. However, transgenic knockout models of either CARP alone or CARP in combination with the other muscle ankyrin repeat proteins (MARPs), ANKRD2 and ANKRD23 demonstrated a lack of cardiac phenotype; mice displayed normal cardiac function at baseline and in response to pressure overload-induced cardiac hypertrophy, suggesting that these proteins are not essential.

Interactions between CARP and the sarcomeric proteins myopalladin and titin suggest that it may also be involved in the myofibrillar stretch-sensor system. Passive stretch in fetal cardiomyocytes induced differential CARP distribution at nuclei and I-band titin N2A regions. In a mouse model of muscular dystrophy with myositis (mdm) caused by a small deletion in titin, CARP mRNA expression was shown to be 30-fold elevated in skeletal muscle tissue.

== Clinical significance ==
A wide spectrum of clinical features have been associated with ANKRD1/CARP. Mutations in ANKRD1 have been associated with dilated cardiomyopathy, two of which result in altered binding with TLN1 and FHL2. Mutations in ANKRD1 have also been associated with hypertrophic cardiomyopathy, and have shown to increase binding of CARP to Titin and MYPN. Examination of the functional effects of CARP hypertrophic cardiomyopathy mutations in engineered heart tissue demonstrated that Thr123Met was a gain-of-function mutation exhibiting augmented contractile properties; whereas Pro52Ala and Ile280Val were unstable and failed to incorporate into sarcomeres, an effect that was remedied upon proteasome inhibition via epoxomicin.

A missense mutation in ANKRD1 was shown to be associated with the congenital heart defect, Anomalous pulmonary venous connection. CARP has been found as a sensitive and specific biomarker for the differential diagnosis of rhabdomyosarcoma. ANKRD1 mRNA levels correlate with patient platinum sensitivity, thus ANKRD1 associates with platinum-based chemotherapy treatment outcome in ovarian adenocarcinoma patients.

CARP and mRNA expression has been shown to be upregulated in left ventricles of heart failure patients. Studies in patients with amyotrophic lateral sclerosis, spinal muscular atrophy, and congenital myopathy, also found altered expression of CARP in skeletal muscle fibers. Another study in congenital muscular dystrophy and Duchenne muscular dystrophy patients showed elevated expression of CARP. CARP expression is also elevated in patients with lupus nephritis, and associates with proteinuria severity, suggesting that it may have biomarker potential.

== Interactions ==
ANKRD1 has been shown to interact with:

- Titin,
- MYPN,
- YBX1,
- CASQ2,
- DES,
- TP53,
- TLN1, and
- FHL2.
