= ANKRD2 =

Protein-coding gene in the species Homo sapiens

Identifiers
- Aliases: ANKRD2, ankyrin repeat domain 2 (stretch responsive muscle), ARPP, ankyrin repeat domain 2
- External IDs: OMIM: 610734; MGI: 1861447; GeneCards: ANKRD2

Gene location (Human)
Chr.	Chromosome 10 (human)
Band	10q24.2	Start	97,572,499 bp
Band	10q24.2	End	97,583,884 bp

Gene location (Mouse)
Chr.	Chromosome 19 (mouse)
Band	19|19 C3	Start	42,024,439 bp
Band	19|19 C3	End	42,033,549 bp
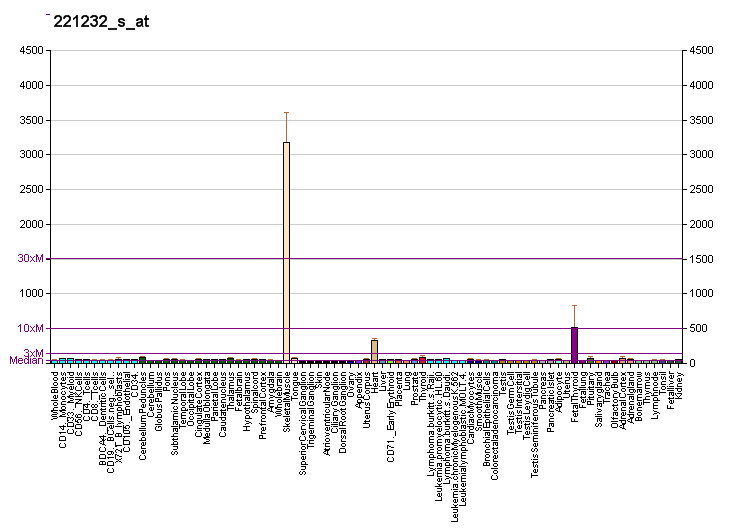
RNA expression pattern
Bgee	Human / Mouse (ortholog); Top expressed in: muscle of thigh; thoracic diaphragm; apex of heart; Skeletal muscle tissue of rectus abdominis; gastrocnemius muscle; left ventricle; Skeletal muscle tissue of biceps brachii; triceps brachii muscle; glutes; deltoid muscle / Top expressed in: soleus muscle; ankle; intercostal muscle; digastric muscle; muscle of thigh; sternocleidomastoid muscle; tibialis anterior muscle; vastus lateralis muscle; gastrocnemius muscle; plantaris muscle; More reference expression data
BioGPS	More reference expression data
Gene ontology
Molecular function	chromatin binding; structural constituent of muscle; RNA polymerase II-specific DNA-binding transcription factor binding; titin binding; protein kinase B binding; transcription coregulator activity
Cellular component	PML body; intracellular membrane-bounded organelle; cytoplasm; cytosol; euchromatin; myofibril; nucleus; sarcomere; I band
Biological process	negative regulation of transcription by RNA polymerase II; regulation of cytokine production; muscle contraction; muscle organ development; negative regulation of myotube differentiation; regulation of transcription from RNA polymerase II promoter in response to oxidative stress; regulation of intrinsic apoptotic signaling pathway by p53 class mediator; regulation of myoblast proliferation; negative regulation of myoblast differentiation; skeletal muscle cell differentiation; regulation of transcription by RNA polymerase II; myoblast differentiation; skeletal muscle tissue development
Sources:Amigo / QuickGO
Orthologs
Databases	NCBI: entry; OMA: entry
Species	Human	Mouse
Entrez	26287	56642
Ensembl	ENSG00000165887	ENSMUSG00000025172
UniProt	Q9GZV1	Q9WV06
RefSeq (mRNA)	NM_020349; NM_001129981; NM_001291218; NM_001291219; NM_001346793	NM_020033
RefSeq (protein)	NP_001123453; NP_001278147; NP_001278148; NP_001333722; NP_065082	NP_064417
Location (UCSC)	Chr 10: 97.57 – 97.58 Mb	Chr 19: 42.02 – 42.03 Mb
PubMed search
- Wikidata
View/Edit Human	View/Edit Mouse

Ankyrin Repeat, PEST sequence and Proline-rich region (ARPP), also known as Ankyrin repeat domain-containing protein 2, is a protein that in humans is encoded by the ANKRD2 gene. ARPP is a member of the muscle ankyrin repeat proteins (MARP), which also includes CARP and DARP, and is highly expressed in cardiac and skeletal muscle and in other tissues. Expression of ARPP has been shown to be altered in patients with dilated cardiomyopathy and amyotrophic lateral sclerosis. A role for Ankrd2 in tumor progression and metastases spreading has also been described.

== Structure ==
Two isoforms of ARPP have been documented; a 39.8 kDa protein isoform composed of 360 amino acids and a 36.2 kDa protein isoform composed of 327 amino acids. ANKRD2 has nine exons, four of which encode ankyrin repeats in the middle region of the protein, a PEST-like and Lysine-rich sequence in the N-terminal region, and a Proline-rich sequence containing consensus sequences for phosphorylation in the C-terminal region. It has been proposed that ARPP can homo- or hetero-dimerize with other MARPs in an antiparallel fashion. ARPP is highly expressed in nuclei and I-bands in slow skeletal fibers and cardiac muscle, specifically in ventricular regions at intercalated discs; and expression in brain, pancreas and esophageal epithelium has also been documented. Though ARPP and CARP proteins show significant homology, their expression profiles in muscle cells are markedly different; CARP is expressed throughout atria and ventricles, in development and in adult myocytes, however ARPP is almost exclusively ventricular and only in adult myocytes. ARPP was also found to be expressed in rhabdomyosarcomas, exhibiting a pattern distinct from actin and desmin.

== Function ==
ARPP localizes to both nuclei and sarcomeres in muscle cells. ARPP may play a role in the differentiation of myocytes, as ARPP expression was shown to be induced during the C2C12 differentiation in vitro. A role for ARPP in regulating muscle gene expression and sensing stress signals was implicated in the finding that ARPP colocalizes with the transcriptional co-activator and co-repressor PML in myoblast nuclei, and binds p53 to enhance the p21(WAFI/CIPI) promoter. It was further demonstrated that Nkx2.5 and p53 synergistically activate the ANKRD2 promoter to promote effects on myogenic differentiation. At the sarcomere, ARPP binds titin at I-bands, which is potentiated by homo-dimerization and can alter the protein kinase A/protein kinase C phosphorylation status of itself or titin. These studies demonstrate a stretch-responsive relationship between ARPP and Titin, which can be rapidly altered by post-translational mechanisms.

Functional insights into ARPP function have come from transgenic studies. In mice lacking all three muscle ankyrin repeat proteins (MARPs), ARPP, CARP, and DARP), skeletal muscles tended towards a more slower fiber type distribution, with longer resting sarcomere length, decreased fiber stiffness, expression of a longer titin isoform, greater degree of torque loss following eccentric contraction-related injury, and enhanced expression of MyoD and MLP. These findings suggest that ARPP and related MARP proteins may play a role in the passive stiffness and gene regulatory roles in skeletal muscle. A study investigating ARPP function in cardiac muscle in which ARPP was knocked out alone or in combination with the other MARPs showed that mice displayed normal cardiac function at baseline and in response to pressure overload-induced cardiac hypertrophy, suggesting that these proteins are not essential for normal cardiac development or in response to a hypertrophic stimulus.

ARPP has also shown to play a role in models of disease. ARPP has also exhibited elevated expression following skeletal muscle denervation, persisting for four weeks following the insult. ARPP (ANKRD2) gene expression was also shown to be rapidly induced in a model of eccentric contraction-related injury, showing peak expression (6-11 times normal value) within 12–24 hours following injury, suggesting that ARPP may play a role in repair. In a mouse model of muscular dystrophy with myositis (mdm) caused by a small deletion in titin, ANKRD2 mRNA expression was shown to be significantly elevated in skeletal muscle tissue along with that of CARP, suggesting a role for ARPP in titin-based signaling. Levels of ARPP were also altered in a mouse model of diabetes.

== Clinical Significance ==
In patients with dilated cardiomyopathy, levels of ARPP were upregulated.

ARPP expression patterns have been shown to be altered in patients with amyotrophic lateral sclerosis (ALS), with decreased expression in slow skeletal muscle fibers and increased expression in fast skeletal muscle fibers.

ARPP has also been shown to be a potentially useful biomarker for the differential diagnosis between oncocytoma and chromophobe renal cell carcinomas.

In non-pathologic physiology, ARPP mRNA expression in skeletal muscle of patients was shown to be elevated two days following fatiguing jumping exercises. Levels of CARP, MLP and calpain-2 mRNA levels were also enhanced, suggesting that these molecules may be part of a signaling network activated by physical exercise.

Ankrd2 has been shown to be involved in the progression of some types of cancers, such as osteosarcoma and head and neck squamous cell carcinoma.

== Interactions ==
ANKRD2 has been shown to interact with

- Titin
- YBX1,
- TCAP,
- PML and
- TP53.
- Lamin A and prelamin A
- Akt.
