= TMEM44 =

Protein-coding gene in the species Homo sapiens

Identifiers
- Aliases: TMEM44, transmembrane protein 44
- External IDs: MGI: 1924489; HomoloGene: 26702; GeneCards: TMEM44; OMA:TMEM44 - orthologs

Gene location (Human)
Chr.	Chromosome 3 (human)
Band	3q29	Start	194,587,673 bp
Band	3q29	End	194,633,689 bp

Gene location (Mouse)
Chr.	Chromosome 16 (mouse)
Band	16|16 B2	Start	30,511,855 bp
Band	16|16 B2	End	30,550,842 bp
RNA expression pattern
Bgee	Human / Mouse (ortholog); Top expressed in: mucosa of transverse colon; right lung; apex of heart; upper lobe of left lung; rectum; stromal cell of endometrium; olfactory zone of nasal mucosa; sural nerve; spleen; minor salivary glands / Top expressed in: lumbar subsegment of spinal cord; ganglionic eminence; ventricular zone; neural tube; superior frontal gyrus; primary visual cortex; prefrontal cortex; genital tubercle; dentate gyrus of hippocampal formation granule cell; hippocampus proper; More reference expression data
BioGPS	n/a
Gene ontology
Molecular function	L-lysine transmembrane transporter activity; L-arginine transmembrane transporter activity; basic amino acid transmembrane transporter activity
Cellular component	membrane; lysosomal membrane; integral component of membrane
Biological process	L-lysine transmembrane transport; L-arginine transmembrane transport; basic amino acid transmembrane transport
Sources:Amigo / QuickGO
Orthologs
Species	Human	Mouse
Entrez	93109	224090
Ensembl	ENSG00000145014	ENSMUSG00000022537
UniProt	Q2T9K0	n/a
RefSeq (mRNA)	NM_001011655; NM_001166305; NM_001166306; NM_138399	NM_172614; NM_001357413; NM_001357414; NM_001357415; NM_001361297
RefSeq (protein)	NP_001011655; NP_001159777; NP_001159778; NP_612408	n/a
Location (UCSC)	Chr 3: 194.59 – 194.63 Mb	Chr 16: 30.51 – 30.55 Mb
PubMed search
- Wikidata
View/Edit Human	View/Edit Mouse

TMEM44 (Transmembrane protein 44) is a protein that in humans is encoded by the TMEM44 gene. DKFZp686O18124 is a synonym of TMEM44.

== Gene ==
TMEM44 gene has 14 transcripts (splice variants). The whole span of the gene is 46,016 base pairs long, while the mRNA sequence of TMEM44 is 1,483 base pairs long, with 13 exons. Exon 1 and 2 partial are part of 5'-UTR, and the partial exon 2 is only highly conserved in primates.

=== Regulation ===
There are 5 experimentally verified promoters, and 4 predicted ones. Promoter GXP_232172, which is promoter set 5 is the longest with 1,276 base pairs and a total of 11 coding transcripts.

=== Expression ===
There is an overall low level expression of TMEM44 gene throughout the body parts and throughout the developmental stages of humans. Some parts where TMEM44 expression is detected are in bone, brain, eye, ovary, pancreas and uterus. Some expression was also detected under certain health conditions including gastrointestinal tumor, glioma, ovarian tumor, pancreatic tumor, muscle tissue tumor and uterine tumor.

== Locus ==
TMEM44 gene is located near the end of the long arm of chromosome 3 (3q29) in humans (Homo sapiens).

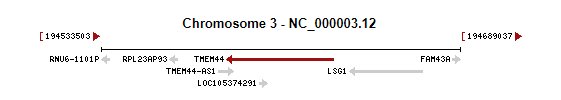
TMEM44 gene on human chromosome 3

== Protein ==
TMEM44 is 428 amino acids in length. The molecular weight of the protein is 47.1kDa, and its formula is C_{2086}H_{3315}N_{585}O_{611}S_{22}, with a total of 6,619 atoms. The theoretical isoelectric point (pI) of TMEM44 is 8.12. The instability index (II) of TMEM44 is 47.96, which classifies the protein as unstable. There are 12 isoforms of TMEM44, with isoform c being the longest. The function of TMEM44 is currently unknown.

=== Subcellular Localization ===
The C-terminus of TMEM44 is found in the cytoplasm, and the protein is predicted to be integrated within the membrane of the endoplasmic reticulum.

=== Secondary Structure ===
TMEM44 has 41.12% of alpha helix, 15.65% of extended strand and 43.22% of random coil.

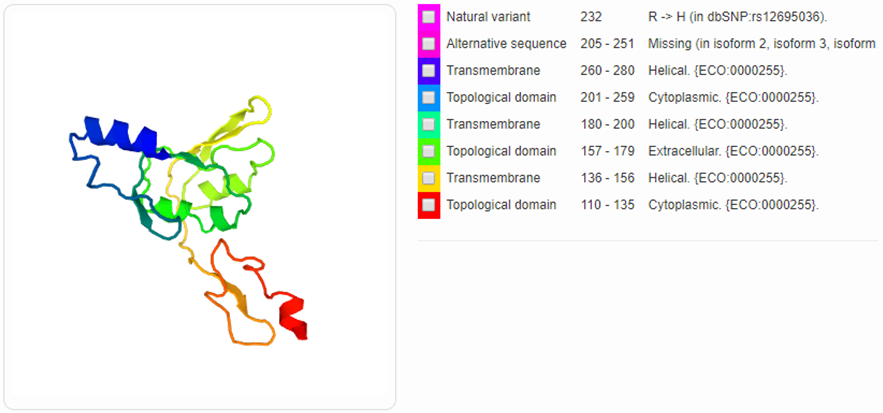
3D of partial TMEM44 protein from sequence 119 to 267 (identity 13%)

==== Transmembrane Region Allocation ====
There are seven predicted transmembrane domains in TMEM44 protein.

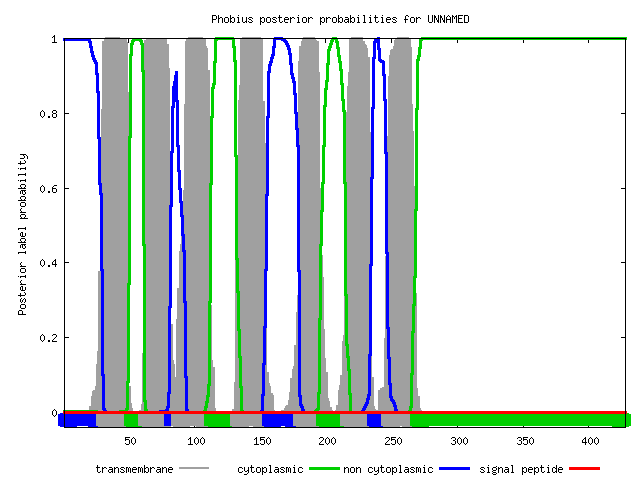
Phobius posterior probabilities of human TMEM44 protein

=== Interacting Proteins ===
GSK3B (Glycogen synthase kinase 3 beta), KAT6B (Histone acetyltransferase KAT6B/Histone acetyltransferase MYST4), TMEM31 (Transmembrane protein 31), SPAG9 (sperm associated antigen 9) and TNKS (tankyrase-1) are predicted to interact with TMEM44.

=== Post-Translational Modification ===
TMEM44 undergoes threonine, tyrosine and serine phosphorylations. Many serine phosphorylation takes place near the C-terminus, causing it to be negatively charged.

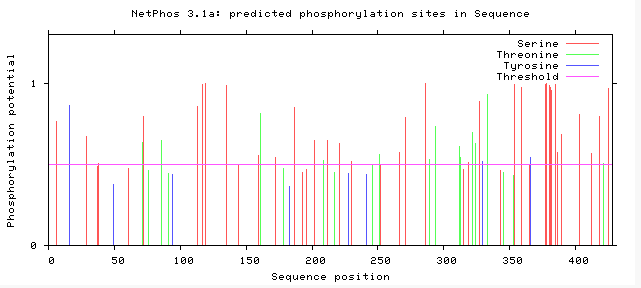
Predicted phosphorylation sites in human TMEM44 protein

The Glycine (G) found nearest from the C-terminus is predicted to have glycosylphosphatidylinositol (GPI) attached, which anchors the protein to the cellular plasma membrane.

The first 45 amino acids serve as a signal peptide cleavage site.

=== Conservation ===
==== Orthologs ====
Orthologs with the TMEM44 protein include amphibians, birds, fish, and mammals. The closest ortholog from human with TMEM44 is common chimpanzee (Pan troglodytes) with 98% identity, and the most distantly related ortholog is common carp (Cyprinus carpio) with 27% identity.

12 selected orthologs of TMEM44 are shown below.

Orthologs of TMEM44
sequence number	genus	species	common name	date of divergence/MYA	NCBI accession number	identity/%
	Homo	sapiens	human	0	AAI44160.1	100
1	Macaca	fascicularis	crab-eating macaque	29	XP_005545405.1	94
2	Rhinolophus	sinicus	Chinese rufous horseshoe bat	96	XP_019578895.1	80
3	Condylura	cristata	star-nosed mole	96	XP_012585115.1	79
4	Enhydra	lutris kenyoni	sea otter	96	XP_022370817.1	78
5	Sorex	araneus	common shrew	96	XP_012791655.1	63
6	Chrysemys	picta bellii	painted turtle	312	XP_023967126.1	51
7	Nipponia	nippon	crested ibis	312	XP_009466798.1	42
8	Xenopus	tropicalis	western clawed frog	353	XP_012818195.1	39
9	Salvelinus	alpinus	arctic char	435	XP_023859379.1	35
10	Hippocampus	comes	tiger tail seahorse	435	XP_019735697.1	33
11	Oreochromis	niloticus	Nile tilapia	435	XP_013119610.1	30
12	Monopterus	albus	Asian swamp eel	435	XP_020452501.1	29

TMEM44 is generally fast evolving, with about 0.310 changes of amino acids per 100 over a million year.

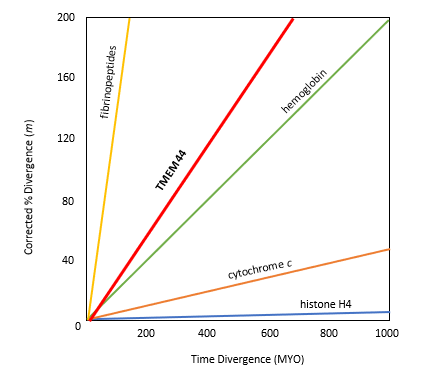
Graph of Corrected Amino Acids Changes per 100 residues (m) over Time showing the rough rate of TMEM44 (red) compared to the other proteins

==== Paralogs ====
Predicted paralogous proteins of TMEM44 are C9IZ85, F8WCY1, F8WE47, H7C3X7, J3KQW3, Q6PL43, and Q96I73.
