= David Glass =

David Glass may refer to:

- David Glass (businessman) (1935–2020), American executive
- David Glass (Canadian politician) (1829–1906), Canadian lawyer and political figure
- David Glass (Israeli politician) (1936–2014), Israeli politician
- David Glass (sociologist) (1911–1978), British demographer and professor of sociology
- David J. Glass (1961- ), American Biologist
