= Tibial muscular dystrophy =

- Other names: Udd (Distal) Myopathy, Tardive tibial muscular dystrophy, Udd-Markesbery muscular dystrophy
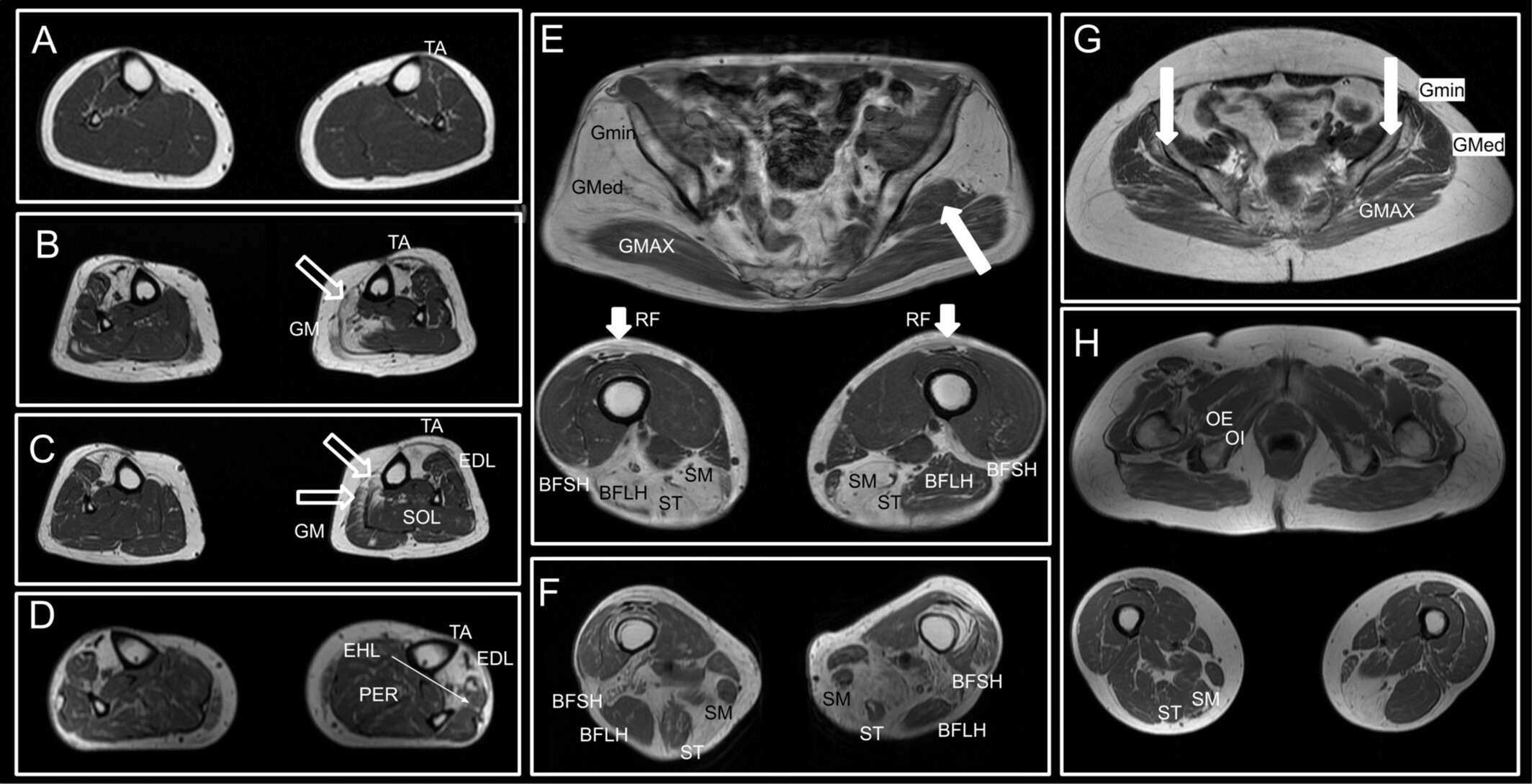
- Selected MR images from different patients with TMD. Tibialis anterior (TA) is early involved, even in patients with minimal fat replacement (A). Generally tibialis anterior is severely involved (B–D). Extensor digitorum longus (EDL) is asymmetrically involved. Some patients have asymmetric and non-homogeneous involvement of soleus (SOL) and gastrocnemius (GM). Axial images from pelvis and thigh of four different patients. Notice the asymmetry and very selective involvement of some muscles. The involvement of gluteus minimus (Gmin) that could be mild (G) / severe (E). Gluteus medium (GMed) could also be involved (E). Semimembranosus (SM), semitendinosus (ST) and biceps femoris (BFSH-short head and BFLH—long head) are the other most commonly involved muscle outside the leg. Some patients may have severe atrophy of rectus femoris (RF).
- Specialty: Neurology
- Symptoms: Weakness and atrophy of tibialis anterior, extensor digitorum longus, extensor hallucis longus
- Usual onset: 35-55 years
- Prognosis: Patients usually remain ambulant, although some of them need mobility aids

Tibial muscular dystrophy (TMD) (also known as Udd myopathy) is a rare hereditary disorder, which is caused by a mutation in a gene TTN. TMD usually begins at the age of 35-55 years and the disease progresses slowly. The disorder causes weakness and atrophy of tibialis anterior, extensor digitorum longus, extensor hallucis longus. TMD is an autosomal dominant condition.

TMD is most common in Finland, which is estimated to be 15:100,000 individuals due to founder effect.

== Symptoms ==
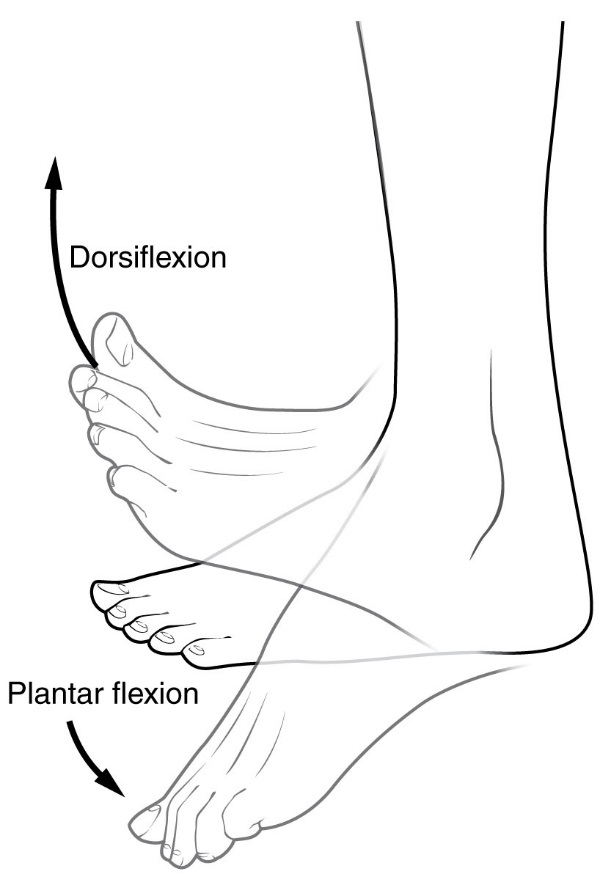
In TMD, patients experience problems with dorsiflexion, which causes problems with lifting foot.

Usually patients first experience weakness of dorsiflexion of feet and incapability to walk on the heels, because of atrophy of anterior compartment of leg . Later (usually after 10 to 20 years), patients experience weakness in long toe extensors, which causes foot drop.

In atypical cases, there's proximal lower limb weakness with/without posterior calf muscle weakness.

== Diagnosis ==
The diagnosis of TMD is suspected by its typical findings, and confirmed by finding monoallelic mutations in the last exon of TTN gene by genetic testing. Serum creatine kinase values are usually normal or slightly raised, also in MRI/CT of the leg, shows fatty degeneration of tibialis anterior.

== Cause ==
This illustration shows titin structure and its last exons, where TMD mutations are occurring, table shows mutations associated with TMD.

TMD is caused by a specific mutations in a gene TTN, which encodes protein titin. TMD associated mutations are located on the last exon Mex6. Finnish patients usually have a unique 11-bp indel mutation, which changes 4 amino acid residues.

TMD cases have been documented in other countries, including France, Italy, and Belgium, with their own unique mutations.

== Pathophysiology ==
In the Finnish variant of TMD mutations, there is an abnormal cleavage of C-terminal part of titin by proteases, which causes disruption of another protease calpain-3.

Also, there is an activation of ER stress, and its activation is insufficient to correct abnormalities of protein, which cause degenerative processes in TMD muscle fibres, in addition there are rimmed vacuoles with accumulation of VCP inside. This causes distortion of pathways, that are related to controlling turnover and degradation (which includes autophagy), leading to muscle fibre loss.

== Treatment ==
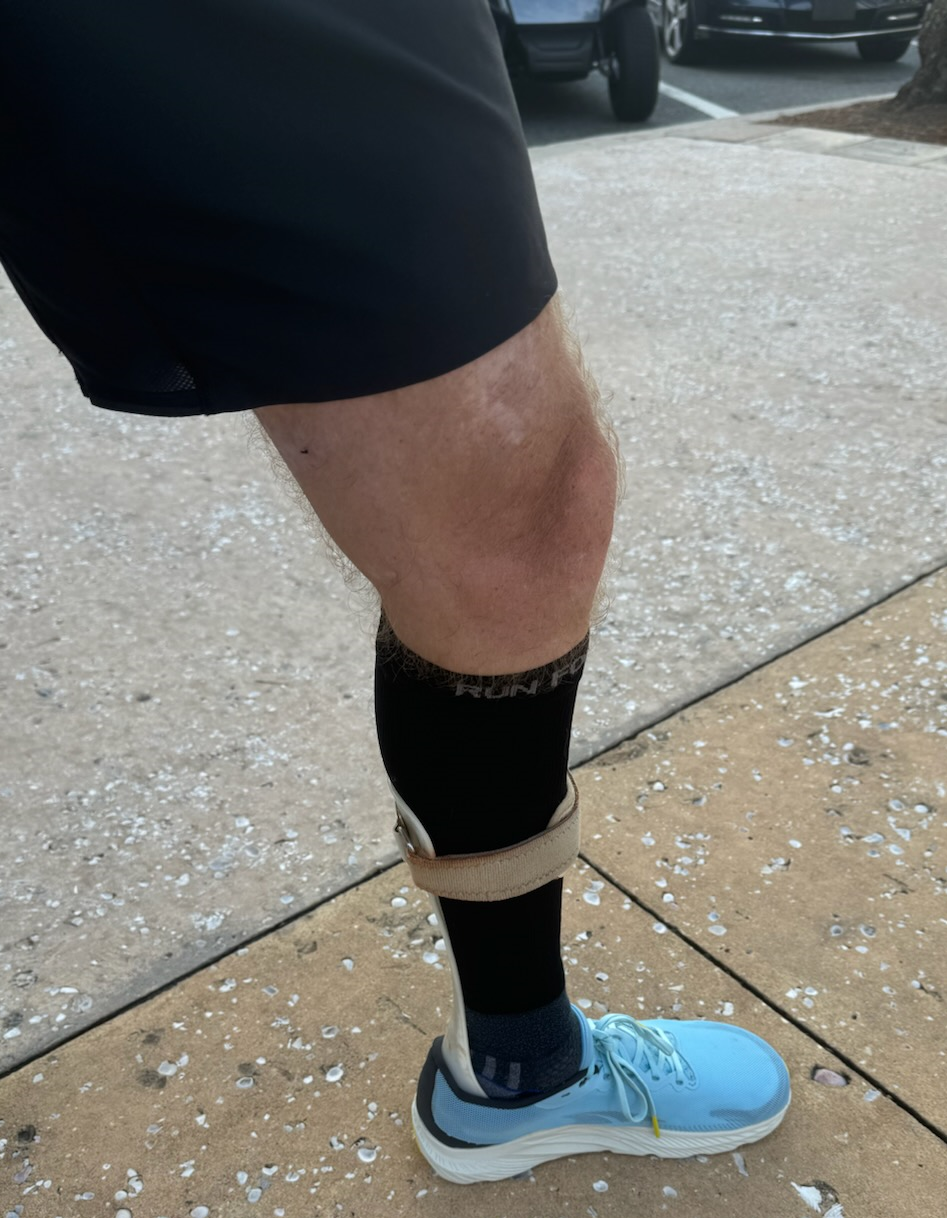
Orthotics can be used in TMD

TMD doesn't have a cure, but managing of symptoms is possible. Management includes use of orthotic device, and in severe cases, tibial posterior tendon transposition, in addition, some of the patients need mobility aid.

== History ==
This disorder was first described by Bjarne Udd (and consequently named after him) and by his colleagues in 1991.
