= SYNE2 =

Protein-coding gene in the species Homo sapiens

Identifiers
- Aliases: SYNE2, EDMD5, NUA, NUANCE, Nesp2, Nesprin-2, SYNE-2, TROPH, spectrin repeat containing nuclear envelope protein 2, KASH2
- External IDs: OMIM: 608442; MGI: 2449316; GeneCards: SYNE2
Available structures
PDB	Ortholog search: PDBe RCSB
PDB	List of PDB id codes 4DXS, 4FI9

Gene location (Human)
Chr.	Chromosome 14 (human)
Band	14q23.2	Start	63,761,899 bp
Band	14q23.2	End	64,226,433 bp

Gene location (Mouse)
Chr.	Chromosome 12 (mouse)
Band	12 C3|12 33.11 cM	Start	75,864,908 bp
Band	12 C3|12 33.11 cM	End	76,157,700 bp
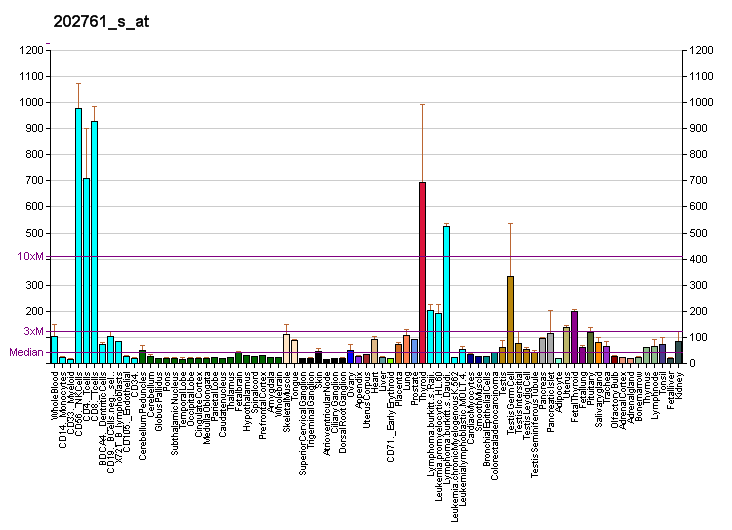
RNA expression pattern
Bgee	Human / Mouse (ortholog); Top expressed in: ventricular zone; Skeletal muscle tissue of biceps brachii; ganglionic eminence; Skeletal muscle tissue of rectus abdominis; triceps brachii muscle; renal medulla; thoracic diaphragm; sural nerve; epithelium of colon; left ovary / Top expressed in: ventricular zone; zygote; secondary oocyte; neural layer of retina; Rostral migratory stream; right kidney; genital tubercle; left lung lobe; ganglionic eminence; lip; More reference expression data
BioGPS	More reference expression data
Gene ontology
Molecular function	actin filament binding; protein binding; actin binding
Cellular component	cytoplasm; integral component of membrane; nuclear membrane; nuclear envelope; membrane; focal adhesion; plasma membrane; sarcoplasmic reticulum; nucleoplasm; aggresome; cell junction; myofibril; Z discdkac; meiotic nuclear membrane microtubule tethering complex; mitochondrion; sarcoplasmic reticulum membrane; intermediate filament cytoskeleton; nuclear lumen; extracellular exosome; nuclear outer membrane; lamellipodium membrane; cytoskeleton; nucleus; filopodium membrane; centrosome
Biological process	fibroblast migration; nuclear envelope organization; nuclear migration along microfilament; positive regulation of cell migration; centrosome localization; nuclear migration; establishment or maintenance of cell polarity; protein localization to nucleus; nucleokinesis involved in cell motility in cerebral cortex radial glia guided migration; regulation of cilium assembly; centriole-centriole cohesion
Sources:Amigo / QuickGO
Orthologs
Databases	NCBI: entry; OMA: entry
Species	Human	Mouse
Entrez	23224	319565
Ensembl	ENSG00000054654	ENSMUSG00000063450
UniProt	Q8WXH0	Q6ZWQ0
RefSeq (mRNA)	NM_015180; NM_182910; NM_182912; NM_182913; NM_182914	NM_001005510
RefSeq (protein)	NP_055995; NP_878914; NP_878917; NP_878918	NP_001005510
Location (UCSC)	Chr 14: 63.76 – 64.23 Mb	Chr 12: 75.86 – 76.16 Mb
PubMed search
- Wikidata
View/Edit Human	View/Edit Mouse

Nesprin-2 is a protein that in humans is encoded by the SYNE2 gene. The human SYNE2 gene consists of 116 exons and encodes nesprin-2, a member of the nuclear envelope (NE) spectrin-repeat (nesprin) family. Nesprins are modular proteins with a central extended spectrin-repeat (SR) rod domain and a C-terminal Klarsicht/ANC-1/Syne homology (KASH) transmembrane domain, which acts as a NE-targeting motif. Nesprin-2 (Nesp2) binds to cytoplasmic F-actin, tethering the nucleus to the cytoskeleton and maintaining the structural integrity of the nucleus.

The human SYNE2 gene encodes a protein of 6,885 amino acids (isoform 1, Nesp2 giant); alternative mRNA splicing produces transcripts encoding a larger isoform and numerous smaller isoforms, some of which are specific to various tissues; alternative start and termination sites within the mRNA also allow translation of smaller isoforms, many possessing unique N- or C-terminal sequences encoded by retained introns. Two mechanisms create splice variants of nesprin-2 with the KASH domain deleted (deltaKASH). In deltaKASH1 variants, deletion of cassette exons 111-112 results in a frame shift that disrupts the KASH domain but retains the 3' untranslated region (UTR) in exon 116 utilized for isoforms containing the KASH domain. This mechanism, which also occurs in SYNE1 mRNA encoding nesprin-1 (enaptin), generates deltaKASH1 isoforms terminating with a distinct 11-amino acid tail (GIAGHSATPPA replacing YPMLRYTNGPPPT in isoforms with KASH). Utilization of an alternative stop codon in exon 115, which is followed by a distinct 3' UTR, generates deltaKASH2 variants. This mechanism truncates larger isoforms without generating a distinct C-terminal sequence. Expression of deltaKASH1 variants occurs largely in brain and kidney, with smaller amounts in heart; deltaKASH2 variants are detected in heart and spleen.
