= Myopalladin =

Protein-coding gene in the species Homo sapiens

MYPN

Identifiers
- Aliases: MYPN, CMD1DD, CMH22, MYOP, RCM4, myopalladin, NEM11
- External IDs: OMIM: 608517; MGI: 1916052; GeneCards: MYPN

Gene location (Human)
Chr.	Chromosome 10 (human)
Band	10q21.3	Start	68,087,897 bp
Band	10q21.3	End	68,212,017 bp

Gene location (Mouse)
Chr.	Chromosome 10 (mouse)
Band	10|10 B4	Start	62,951,574 bp
Band	10|10 B4	End	63,039,731 bp
RNA expression pattern
Bgee	Human / Mouse (ortholog); Top expressed in: muscle of thigh; gastrocnemius muscle; vastus lateralis muscle; Skeletal muscle tissue of rectus abdominis; deltoid muscle; tibialis anterior muscle; Skeletal muscle tissue of biceps brachii; myocardium of left ventricle; apex of heart; right auricle of heart / Top expressed in: medial head of gastrocnemius muscle; knee joint; triceps brachii muscle; extraocular muscle; vastus lateralis muscle; ankle; temporal muscle; digastric muscle; sternocleidomastoid muscle; tibialis anterior muscle; More reference expression data
BioGPS	n/a
Gene ontology
Molecular function	SH3 domain binding; cytoskeletal protein binding; actin binding; protein binding; muscle alpha-actinin binding; actin filament binding; cell-cell adhesion mediator activity
Cellular component	cytoplasm; sarcomere; Z discdkac; I band; nucleus; plasma membrane; axon
Biological process	sarcomere organization; regulation of cell migration; regulation of cytoskeleton organization; homophilic cell adhesion via plasma membrane adhesion molecules; axon guidance; dendrite self-avoidance
Sources:Amigo / QuickGO
Orthologs
Databases	NCBI: entry; OMA: entry
Species	Human	Mouse
Entrez	84665	68802
Ensembl	ENSG00000138347	ENSMUSG00000020067
UniProt	Q86TC9	Q5DTJ9
RefSeq (mRNA)	NM_001256267; NM_001256268; NM_032578	NM_182992
RefSeq (protein)	NP_001243196; NP_001243197; NP_115967	NP_892037
Location (UCSC)	Chr 10: 68.09 – 68.21 Mb	Chr 10: 62.95 – 63.04 Mb
PubMed search
- Wikidata
View/Edit Human	View/Edit Mouse

Myopalladin is a protein that in humans is encoded by the MYPN gene. Myopalladin is a muscle protein responsible for tethering proteins at the Z-disc and for communicating between the sarcomere and the nucleus in cardiac and skeletal muscle

== Structure ==
Myopalladin is a 145.2 kDa protein composed of 1320 amino acids. Myopalladin has five Ig-like repeats within the protein, and a proline-rich domain. Myopalladin binds the Src homology domain of nebulette and nebulin and tethers it to alpha-actinin via its C-terminal domain binding to the EF hand domains of alpha-actinin. The N-terminal region of myopalladin binds to the nuclear protein CARP, known to regulate gene expression in muscle. It also has been shown to bind ANKRD23.

== Function ==
Myopalladin has dual subcellular localization, residing in both the nucleus and sarcomere/I-bands in muscle. Accordingly, myopalladin has functions in both sarcomere assembly and in control of gene expression. Specifics of these functions were gleaned from studies involving MYPN mutants associated with various cardiomyopathies. The Q529X myopalladin mutant demonstrated incompetence in recruiting key binding partners such as desmin, alpha-actinin and CARP to the Z-disc during myofibrilogenesis. In contrast, the Y20C mutant resulted in decreased expression of binding partners.

== Clinical significance ==
Mutations in MYPN have been linked to nemaline myopathy, dilated cardiomyopathy, hypertrophic cardiomyopathy and restrictive cardiomyopathy.
