= GMEB1 =

Protein-coding gene in humans

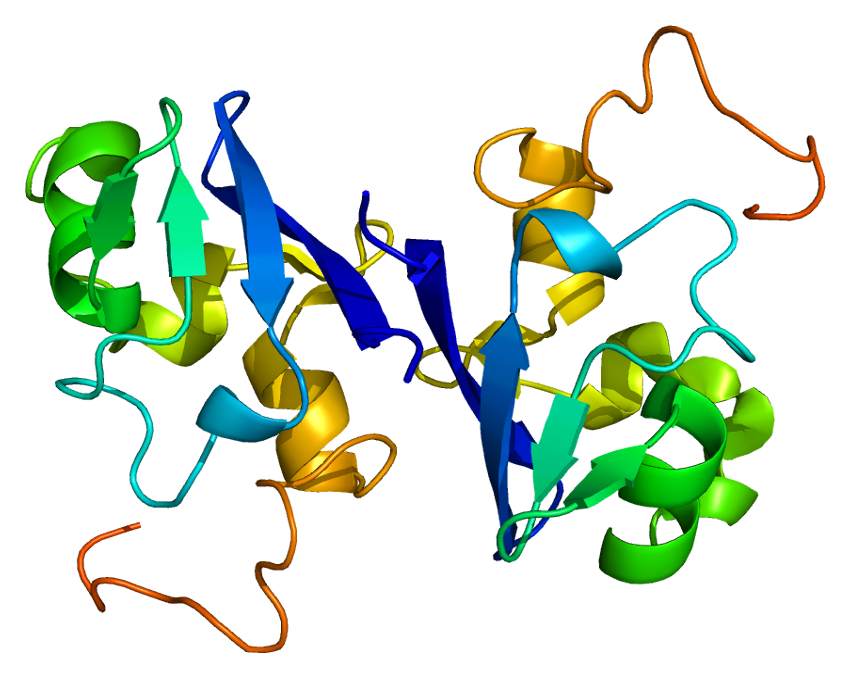

Identifiers
- Aliases: GMEB1, P96PIF, PIF96, glucocorticoid modulatory element binding protein 1
- External IDs: OMIM: 604409; MGI: 2135604; GeneCards: GMEB1
Available structures
PDB	Ortholog search: PDBe RCSB
PDB	List of PDB id codes 1OQJ

Gene location (Human)
Chr.	Chromosome 1 (human)
Band	1p35.3	Start	28,668,778 bp
Band	1p35.3	End	28,719,353 bp

Gene location (Mouse)
Chr.	Chromosome 4 (mouse)
Band	4|4 D2.3	Start	132,221,025 bp
Band	4|4 D2.3	End	132,261,602 bp
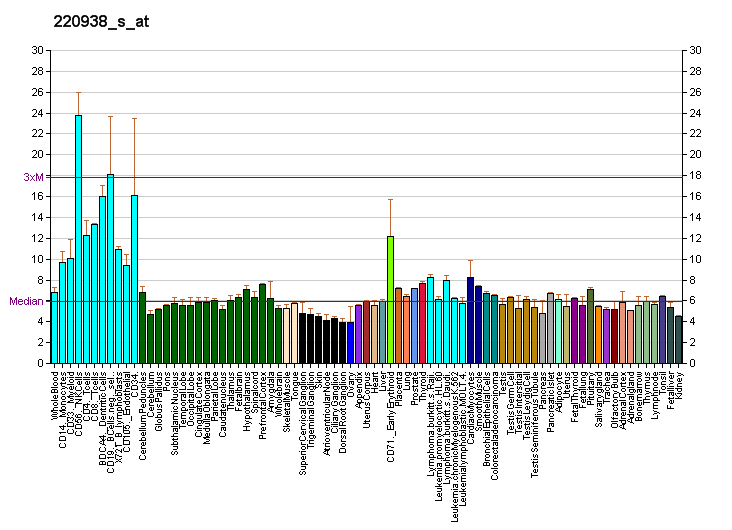
RNA expression pattern
Bgee	Human / Mouse (ortholog); Top expressed in: endothelial cell; secondary oocyte; buccal mucosa cell; tibia; visceral pleura; ganglionic eminence; monocyte; testicle; parietal pleura; amniotic fluid / Top expressed in: zygote; secondary oocyte; genital tubercle; tail of embryo; Rostral migratory stream; granulocyte; fossa; ureter; primitive streak; primary oocyte; More reference expression data
BioGPS	More reference expression data
Gene ontology
Molecular function	RNA polymerase II cis-regulatory region sequence-specific DNA binding; DNA-binding transcription factor activity; DNA binding; transcription coactivator activity; DNA-binding transcription activator activity, RNA polymerase II-specific; metal ion binding; DNA-binding transcription factor activity, RNA polymerase II-specific
Cellular component	cytoplasm; nucleus; nucleoplasm
Biological process	regulation of transcription by RNA polymerase II; regulation of transcription, DNA-templated; transcription by RNA polymerase II; positive regulation of transcription by RNA polymerase II; transcription, DNA-templated
Sources:Amigo / QuickGO
Orthologs
Databases	NCBI: entry; OMA: entry
Species	Human	Mouse
Entrez	10691	56809
Ensembl	ENSG00000162419	ENSMUSG00000028901
UniProt	Q9Y692	Q9JL60
RefSeq (mRNA)	NM_006582; NM_024482; NM_001319674	NM_001122992; NM_020273
RefSeq (protein)	NP_001306603; NP_006573; NP_077808	NP_001116464; NP_064669
Location (UCSC)	Chr 1: 28.67 – 28.72 Mb	Chr 4: 132.22 – 132.26 Mb
PubMed search
- Wikidata
View/Edit Human	View/Edit Mouse

Glucocorticoid modulatory element-binding protein 1 is a protein that in humans is encoded by the GMEB1 gene.

== Function ==
This gene is a member of KDWK gene family. The product of this gene associates with GMEB2 protein, and the complex is essential for parvovirus DNA replication. Study of rat homolog implicates the role of this gene in modulation of transactivation by the glucocorticoid receptor bound to glucocorticoid response elements. Two alternative spliced transcript variants encoding different isoforms exist.

== Interactions ==
GMEB1 has been shown to interact with TRIM63.
