= RBBP6 =

Protein-coding gene in the species Homo sapiens

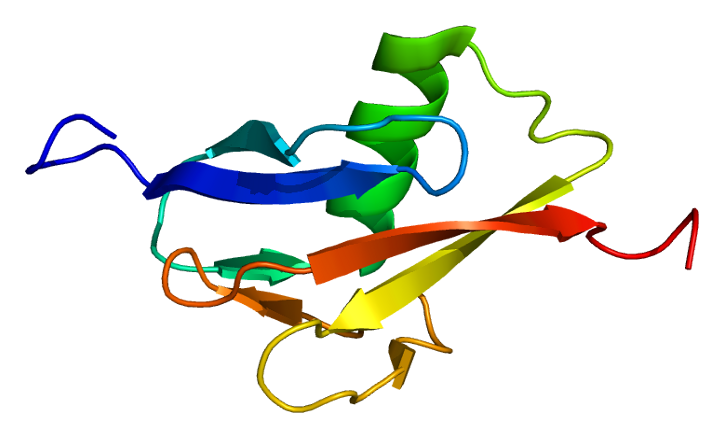

Identifiers
- Aliases: RBBP6, MY038, P2P-R, PACT, RBQ-1, SNAMA, retinoblastoma binding protein 6, RB binding protein 6, ubiquitin ligase
- External IDs: OMIM: 600938; MGI: 894835; GeneCards: RBBP6
Available structures
PDB	Ortholog search: PDBe RCSB
PDB	List of PDB id codes 2C7H, 2YSA, 2YUR, 3ZTG
Enzyme activity
EC #	BRENDA	ExPASy	KEGG	MetaCyc
2.3.2.27	↗	↗	↗	↗

Gene location (Human)
Chr.	Chromosome 16 (human)
Band	16p12.1	Start	24,537,693 bp
Band	16p12.1	End	24,572,863 bp

Gene location (Mouse)
Chr.	Chromosome 7 (mouse)
Band	7|7 F2	Start	122,564,909 bp
Band	7|7 F2	End	122,601,780 bp
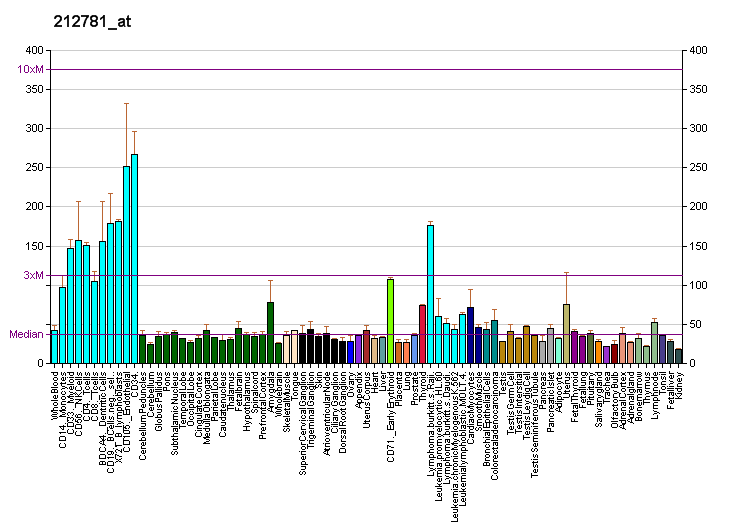

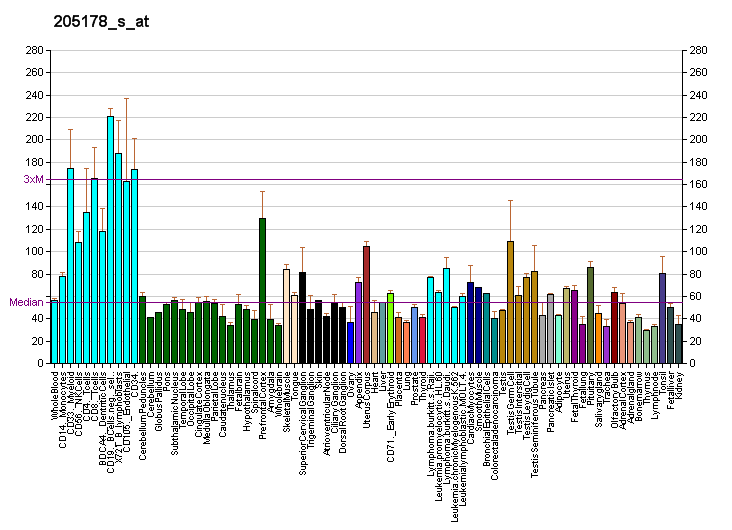

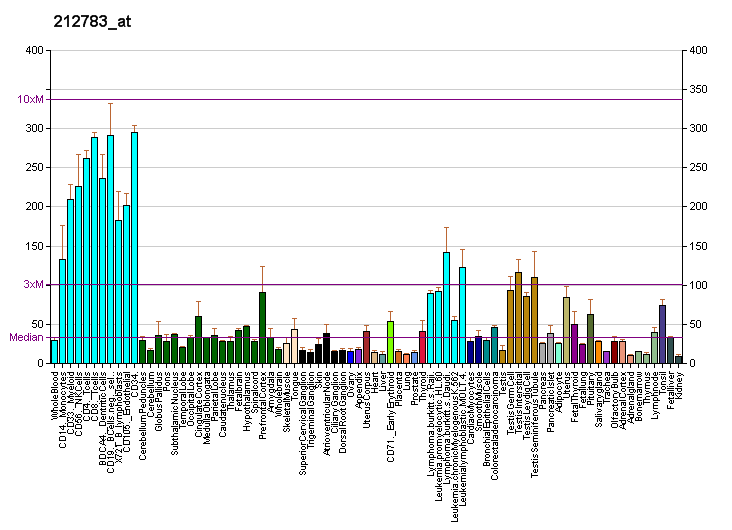
RNA expression pattern
Bgee	Human / Mouse (ortholog); Top expressed in: buccal mucosa cell; sperm; gastric mucosa; left ovary; mucosa of paranasal sinus; right ovary; right uterine tube; left testis; right testis; skin of abdomen / Top expressed in: tail of embryo; genital tubercle; medullary collecting duct; neural layer of retina; ventricular zone; Ileal epithelium; thymus; spermatid; plantaris muscle; renal corpuscle; More reference expression data
BioGPS	More reference expression data
Gene ontology
Molecular function	protein binding; zinc ion binding; nucleic acid binding; metal ion binding; ubiquitin-protein transferase activity; ubiquitin protein ligase activity; transferase activity; RNA binding; protein kinase binding
Cellular component	nucleolus; microtubule organizing center; nucleus; chromosome; cytoplasm; cytoskeleton; cytosol; centrosome; nuclear speck; protein-containing complex
Biological process	in utero embryonic development; embryonic organ development; regulation of DNA replication; DNA replication; cellular response to DNA damage stimulus; protein ubiquitination; multicellular organism growth; somite development; mRNA processing; protein polyubiquitination; ubiquitin-dependent protein catabolic process
Sources:Amigo / QuickGO
Orthologs
Databases	NCBI: entry; OMA: entry
Species	Human	Mouse
Entrez	5930	19647
Ensembl	ENSG00000122257	ENSMUSG00000030779
UniProt	Q7Z6E9	P97868
RefSeq (mRNA)	NM_006910; NM_018703; NM_032626	NM_011247; NM_175023
RefSeq (protein)	NP_008841; NP_061173; NP_116015	NP_035377; NP_778188; NP_001390011; NP_001390012
Location (UCSC)	Chr 16: 24.54 – 24.57 Mb	Chr 7: 122.56 – 122.6 Mb
PubMed search
- Wikidata
View/Edit Human	View/Edit Mouse

Retinoblastoma-binding protein 6 is a protein that in humans is encoded by the RBBP6 gene.

== Function ==
The retinoblastoma tumor suppressor (pRB) protein binds with many other proteins. In various human cancers, pRB suppresses cellular proliferation and is inactivated. Cell cycle-dependent phosphorylation regulates the activity of pRB. This gene encodes a protein which binds to underphosphorylated but not phosphorylated pRB. Multiple alternatively spliced transcript variants that encode different isoforms have been found for this gene.

== Interactions ==
RBBP6 has been shown to interact with Y box binding protein 1.
