= SYNE3 =

Protein-coding gene in the species Homo sapiens

Identifiers
- Aliases: SYNE3, C14orf49, NET53, Nesp3, spectrin repeat containing nuclear envelope family member 3, C14orf139, KASH3, LINC00341, NCRNA00341
- External IDs: OMIM: 610861; MGI: 2442408; GeneCards: SYNE3

Gene location (Human)
Chr.	Chromosome 14 (human)
Band	14q32.13	Start	95,407,266 bp
Band	14q32.13	End	95,516,650 bp

Gene location (Mouse)
Chr.	Chromosome 12 (mouse)
Band	12|12 E	Start	104,896,192 bp
Band	12|12 E	End	104,976,068 bp
RNA expression pattern
Bgee	Human / Mouse (ortholog); Top expressed in: tendon of biceps brachii; parietal pleura; synovial membrane; trabecular bone; synovial joint; skin of hip; visceral pleura; superficial temporal artery; pericardium; skin of thigh / Top expressed in: neural layer of retina; granulocyte; zygote; lip; embryo; thymus; endothelial cell of lymphatic vessel; esophagus; embryo; secondary oocyte; More reference expression data
BioGPS	n/a
Gene ontology
Molecular function	actin filament binding; protein binding; cytoskeletal protein binding
Cellular component	integral component of membrane; rough endoplasmic reticulum; nuclear outer membrane; nuclear envelope; membrane; meiotic nuclear membrane microtubule tethering complex; nucleus; endoplasmic reticulum; nuclear membrane; cytoplasm
Biological process	establishment of protein localization to membrane; cytoskeleton organization; regulation of cell shape; nuclear migration; nucleus localization
Sources:Amigo / QuickGO
Orthologs
Databases	NCBI: entry; OMA: entry
Species	Human	Mouse
Entrez	161176	212073
Ensembl	ENSG00000176438	ENSMUSG00000054150
UniProt	Q6ZMZ3	Q4FZC9
RefSeq (mRNA)	NM_024633; NM_152592; NM_001363692; NM_001384281; NM_001384282 NM_001384283; NM_001384284	NM_001042699; NM_172500
RefSeq (protein)	NP_689805; NP_001350621	NP_001036164; NP_766088; NP_001390387
Location (UCSC)	Chr 14: 95.41 – 95.52 Mb	Chr 12: 104.9 – 104.98 Mb
PubMed search
- Wikidata
View/Edit Human	View/Edit Mouse

Spectrin repeat containing nuclear envelope family member 3, or Nesprin-3, is a Nesprin-family protein that in humans is encoded by the SYNE3 gene. Nesprin-3 localizes to the outer nuclear membrane, where it is retained by SUN domain-containing proteins. The n-terminus of Nesprin-3 faces the cytoplasm and associates with the cytolinker protein Plectin.
