= David J. Glass =

American biomedical scientist (born 1961)

- Born: 1961 (age 64–65)
- Education: Bronx High School of Science, Columbia University (BS), New York Medical College (MD)
- Occupation: Biomedical scientist
- Employer: Regeneron

David J. Glass (born May 11, 1961) is an American biomedical scientist who has worked on elucidating the mechanisms by which skeletal muscle undergoes hypertrophy and atrophy. He played a role in discovering the "MuSK protein receptor" (Muscle Specific-kinase) that is responsible for formation of the neuromuscular junction, and d the mechanism by which MuSK is activated - it's a receptor for the motor neuron-secreted protein, agrin. He also wrote a book aimed at teaching biology graduate students how to design their experiments.

Glass is an elected member of the National Academy of Sciences and the American Association for the Advancement of Science. Earlier, he was elected to the American Society for Clinical Investigation.

Glass is also a playwright. His play, "Love + Science" was produced Off-Broadway in New York City in 2023. His most recent play is "Spare Parts," which was staged at Theatre Row (New York City) from March through April 2026.

== Scientific career ==
Glass helped to identify the mechanism by which muscles connect to nerves. Glass and his colleagues, including George Yancopoulos, discovered a receptor tyrosine kinase which they named "MuSK" (Muscle Specific Kinase, or MuSK protein). They went on to show that MuSK is required for the formation of the neuromuscular junction, the key structure which allows motor neurons to induce skeletal muscle to contract. They next demonstrated that the ligand for MuSK is agrin, a protein secreted by the motor neuron to induce formation of the neuromuscular junction.

Glass also cloned receptors for neurotrophic factors, such as TrkB, the receptor for BDNF, and showed that they were sufficient to mediate signaling without the requirement of the Low affinity Nerve Growth Factor receptor (LNGFR).

Glass identified the E3 ubiquitin ligases, MuRF1 and FBXO32/Atrogin1/MAFbx, which are upregulated during skeletal muscle atrophy; mice which are null for these ligases were found to have less loss of muscle under atrophic conditions. One substrate of MuRF1 is Myosin heavy chain (MHC), a major component of the sarcomere. Therefore, by degrading MHC, MuRF1 breaks down a major component of skeletal muscle, inducing muscle to atrophy.

Glass further identified the Akt pathway as being critical for inducing skeletal muscle to undergo hypertrophy. Briefly, the growth factor IGF1 induces muscle to hypertrophy, or expand in size, via the increase in size of the pre-existing muscle fibers. This happens by IGF1/IGF1R/PI3K/Akt signaling, which in turn both activates the mTOR pathway to increase protein synthesis, and inhibits the transcriptional upregulation of MuRF1, by blocking nuclear translocation of the Foxo family of transcription factors.

== Book on experimental design, and a critique of hypothesis-testing ==
David Glass is the author of a book aimed at teaching students how to design biology experiments, titled "Experimental Design for Biologists." The book is in its 2nd edition, published by Cold Spring Harbor Laboratory Press. In the initial chapters of his book, Glass argues against hypothesis testing as a framework for performing experiments, and instead suggests that experiments should initially be framed with questions, in order to stimulate the production of data. Once there is data, then that can be used to produce a model, which can next be tested for its predictive power. While he doesn't mention Bayesian reasoning, these suggestions are reminiscent of Bayesian methods. Glass also argued against hypothesis testing in an article titled, "A critique of the hypothesis, and a defense of the question, as a framework for experimentation.".

== Editorial role ==
Glass was the founding editor-in-chief of the Elsevier journal Skeletal Muscle.

== Honors and awards ==
- Elected (2024) to the National Academy of Sciences.
- Elected (2021) to the American Association for the Advancement of Science.
- President, Society for Muscle Biology (SMB) 2025
- Elected (2024), Academy of Geroscience
- Elected (2004) to the American Society for Clinical Investigation.
- Elected (2024) member to the New York Academy of Medicine.

== Theater ==
Glass wrote "Love + Science", which was produced Off-Broadway at City Center in New York City in the summer of 2023, and was reviewed by the New York Times, and by the editor-in-chief of Science.

His most recent play is "Spare Parts," which was presented at Theatre Row (New York City) in March though April 2026. It too was reviewed in Science.

== Selected papers ==
- Glass DJ, Nye SH, Hantzopoulos P, et al. (July 1991). "TrkB mediates BDNF/NT-3-dependent survival and proliferation in fibroblasts lacking the low affinity NGF receptor". Cell. 66 (2): 405–13. doi:10.1016/0092-8674(91)90629-D. PMID 1649703. S2CID 43626580.
- DeChiara TM, Bowen DC, Valenzuela DM, et al. (May 1996). "The receptor tyrosine kinase MuSK is required for neuromuscular junction formation in vivo". Cell. 85 (4): 501–12. doi:10.1016/S0092-8674(00)81251-9. PMID 8653786. S2CID 17455481.
- Glass DJ, Bowen DC, Stitt TN, et al. (May 1996). "Agrin acts via a MuSK receptor complex". Cell. 85 (4): 513–23. doi:10.1016/S0092-8674(00)81252-0. PMID 8653787. S2CID 14930468.
- Bodine S, Stitt TN, Gonzalez M, Kline WO, Stover GL, Bauerlein R, Zlotchenko E, Scrimgeour A, Lawrence JC, Glass DJ, Yancopoulos GD (2001). "Akt/mTOR pathway is a crucial regulator of skeletal muscle hypertrophy and can prevent muscle atrophy in vivo". Nature Cell Biology. 3 (1): 1014–1019. Bibcode:2001NaCB....3.1014B. doi:10.1038/ncb1101-1014. PMID 11715023.
- Bodine SC, Latres E, Baumhueter S, Lai VK, Nunez L, Clarke BA, Poueymirou WT, Panaro FJ, Na E, Dharmarajan K, Pan ZQ, Valenzuela DM, DeChiara TM, Stitt TN, Yancopoulos GD, Glass DJ (2001). "Identification of ubiquitin ligases required for skeletal muscle atrophy". Science. 294 (5547): 1704–1708. Bibcode:2001Sci...294.1704B. doi:10.1126/science.1065874. PMID 11679633.
- Rommel C, Bodine SC, Clarke BA, Rossman R, Nunez L, Stitt TN, Yancopoulos GD, Glass DJ (2001). "Mediation of IGF-1-induced skeletal myotube hypertrophy by PI(3)K/Akt/mTOR and PI(3)K/Akt/GSK3 pathways". Nature Cell Biology. 3 (11): 1009–1013. Bibcode:2001NaCB....3.1009R. doi:10.1038/ncb1101-1009. PMID 11715022.
- Stitt TN, Drujan D, Clarke BA, Panaro F, Timofeyva Y, Kline WO, Gonzalez M, Yancopoulos GD, Glass DJ (2004). "The IGF-1/PI3K/Akt pathway prevents expression of muscle atrophy-induced ubiquitin ligases by inhibiting FOXO transcription factors". Molecular Cell. 14 (3): 395–403. doi:10.1016/s1097-2765(04)00211-4. PMID 15125842.
- Egerman MA, Cadena SM, Gilbert JA, Meyer A, Nelson HN, Swalley SE, Mallozzi C, Jacobi C, Jennings LL, Clay I, Laurent G, Ma S, Brachat S, Lach-Trifilieff E, Shavlakadze T, Trendelenburg AU, Brack AS, Glass DJ (2014). "GDF11 Increases with Age and Inhibits Skeletal Muscle Regeneration". Cell Metabolism. 22 (1): 164–174. doi:10.1016/j.cmet.2015.05.010. PMC 4497834. PMID 26001423.
- Lach-Trifilieff E, Minetti GC, Sheppard K, Ibebunjo C, Feige JN, Hartmann S, Brachat S, Rivet H, Koelbing C, Morvan F, Hatakeyama S, Glass DJ (2014). "An antibody blocking activin type II receptors induces strong skeletal muscle hypertrophy and protects from atrophy". Molecular and Cellular Biology. 34 (4): 606–618. doi:10.1128/MCB.01307-13. PMC 3911487. PMID 24298022.
- Herman JL, Dornbos P, Landheer K, Geraghty BJ, Egerman MA, Phan D, Germino M, Mastaitis JW, Walls JR, Lotta LA, Abecasis G, Baras A, Altarejos JY, Sleeman MW, Regeneron Genetics Center, Melander O, Malmö Diet and Cancer Study, Shavlakadze T, Yancopoulos GD, Bovijn J, Marchini J, Glass DJ (2026). "Humans with function-disrupting variants in the myostatin gene (MSTN) have increased skeletal muscle mass and strength, and less adiposity". Nature Communications. 17 (1) 3891. Bibcode:2026NatCo..17.3891H. doi:10.1038/s41467-026-70422-2. PMC 13125550. PMID 41826329.
