= Titin =

Largest known protein in human muscles

TTN
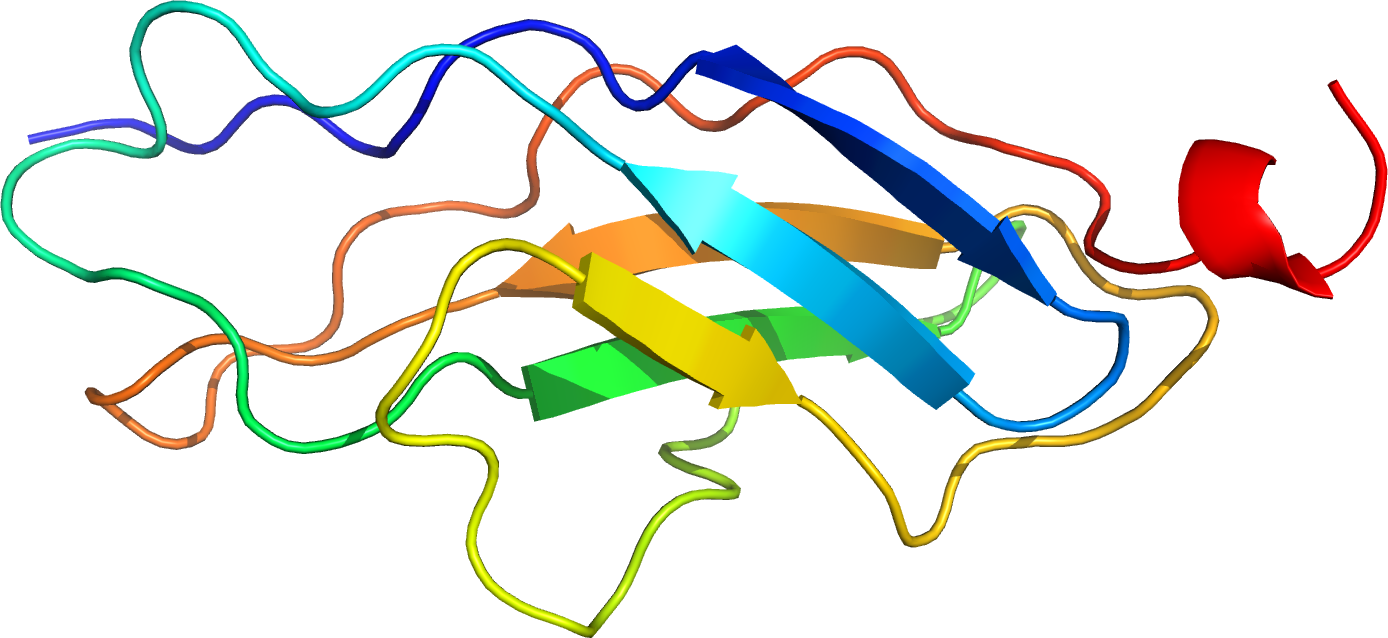

Identifiers
- Aliases: TTN, CMD1G, CMH9, CMPD4, EOMFC, HMERF, LGMD2J, MYLK5, TMD, titin, SALMY, LGMDR10
- External IDs: OMIM: 188840; MGI: 98864; GeneCards: TTN
Available structures
PDB	Ortholog search: PDBe RCSB
PDB	List of PDB id codes 4UOW, 1BPV, 1G1C, 1NCT, 1NCU, 1TIT, 1TIU, 1TKI, 1TNM, 1TNN, 1WAA, 1YA5, 2A38, 2BK8, 2F8V, 2ILL, 2J8H, 2J8O, 2NZI, 2RQ8, 2WP3, 2WWK, 2WWM, 2Y9R, 3KNB, 3LCY, 3LPW, 3PUC, 3Q5O, 3QP3, 4C4K, 4JNW, 4O00, 4QEG, 5BS0
Enzyme activity
EC #	BRENDA	ExPASy	KEGG	MetaCyc
2.7.11.1	↗	↗	↗	↗

Gene location (Human)
Chr.	Chromosome 2 (human)
Band	2q31.2	Start	178,525,989 bp
Band	2q31.2	End	178,830,802 bp

Gene location (Mouse)
Chr.	Chromosome 2 (mouse)
Band	2 C3|2 45.13 cM	Start	76,703,980 bp
Band	2 C3|2 45.13 cM	End	76,982,547 bp
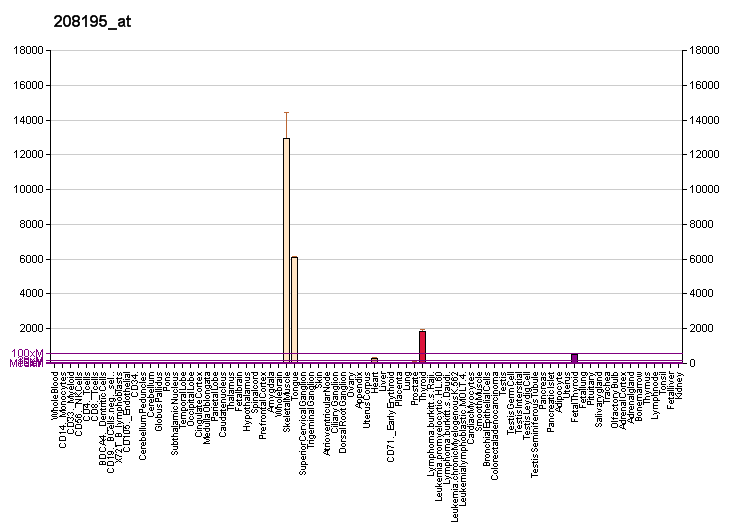
RNA expression pattern
Bgee	Human / Mouse (ortholog); Top expressed in: glutes; Skeletal muscle tissue of biceps brachii; triceps brachii muscle; Skeletal muscle tissue of rectus abdominis; right ventricle; thoracic diaphragm; body of tongue; vastus lateralis muscle; deltoid muscle; myocardium of left ventricle / Top expressed in: vastus lateralis muscle; digastric muscle; triceps brachii muscle; sternocleidomastoid muscle; knee joint; body of femur; temporal muscle; atrium; intercostal muscle; medial head of gastrocnemius muscle; More reference expression data
BioGPS	More reference expression data
Gene ontology
Molecular function	transferase activity; nucleotide binding; calcium ion binding; protein kinase activity; actinin binding; muscle alpha-actinin binding; structural molecule activity conferring elasticity; metal ion binding; telethonin binding; protease binding; protein self-association; actin filament binding; protein serine/threonine kinase activity; kinase activity; protein binding; identical protein binding; enzyme binding; protein tyrosine kinase activity; structural constituent of muscle; ATP binding; protein kinase binding; calmodulin binding; structural constituent of cytoskeleton; ankyrin binding
Cellular component	cytoplasm; cytosol; I band; striated muscle thin filament; condensed nuclear chromosome; extracellular region; Z discdkac; muscle myosin complex; extracellular exosome; nucleus; M band; sarcomere; A band; myofibril
Biological process	sarcomerogenesis; muscle contraction; mitotic chromosome condensation; cardiac muscle contraction; phosphorylation; cardiac muscle hypertrophy; platelet degranulation; cardiac muscle tissue morphogenesis; skeletal muscle thin filament assembly; detection of muscle stretch; response to calcium ion; cardiac myofibril assembly; protein phosphorylation; muscle filament sliding; regulation of protein kinase activity; regulation of catalytic activity; sarcomere organization; skeletal muscle myosin thick filament assembly; striated muscle contraction; peptidyl-tyrosine phosphorylation; positive regulation of gene expression; protein kinase A signaling; positive regulation of protein secretion; somitogenesis; ventricular system development; in utero embryonic development; heart morphogenesis; striated muscle cell development; heart growth; adult heart development; forward locomotion; development of the heart; regulation of relaxation of cardiac muscle; actin filament organization; striated muscle myosin thick filament assembly
Sources:Amigo / QuickGO
Orthologs
Databases	NCBI: entry; OMA: entry
Species	Human	Mouse
Entrez	7273	22138
Ensembl	ENSG00000155657	ENSMUSG00000051747
UniProt	Q8WZ42	A2ASS6
RefSeq (mRNA)	NM_001256850; NM_001267550; NM_003319; NM_133378; NM_133379 NM_133432; NM_133437	NM_011652; NM_028004
RefSeq (protein)	NP_001243779; NP_001254479; NP_003310; NP_596869; NP_596870 NP_597676; NP_597681; NP_035782; NP_082280; NP_001372637	NP_035782; NP_082280; NP_001372637
Location (UCSC)	Chr 2: 178.53 – 178.83 Mb	Chr 2: 76.7 – 76.98 Mb
PubMed search
- Wikidata
View/Edit Human	View/Edit Mouse

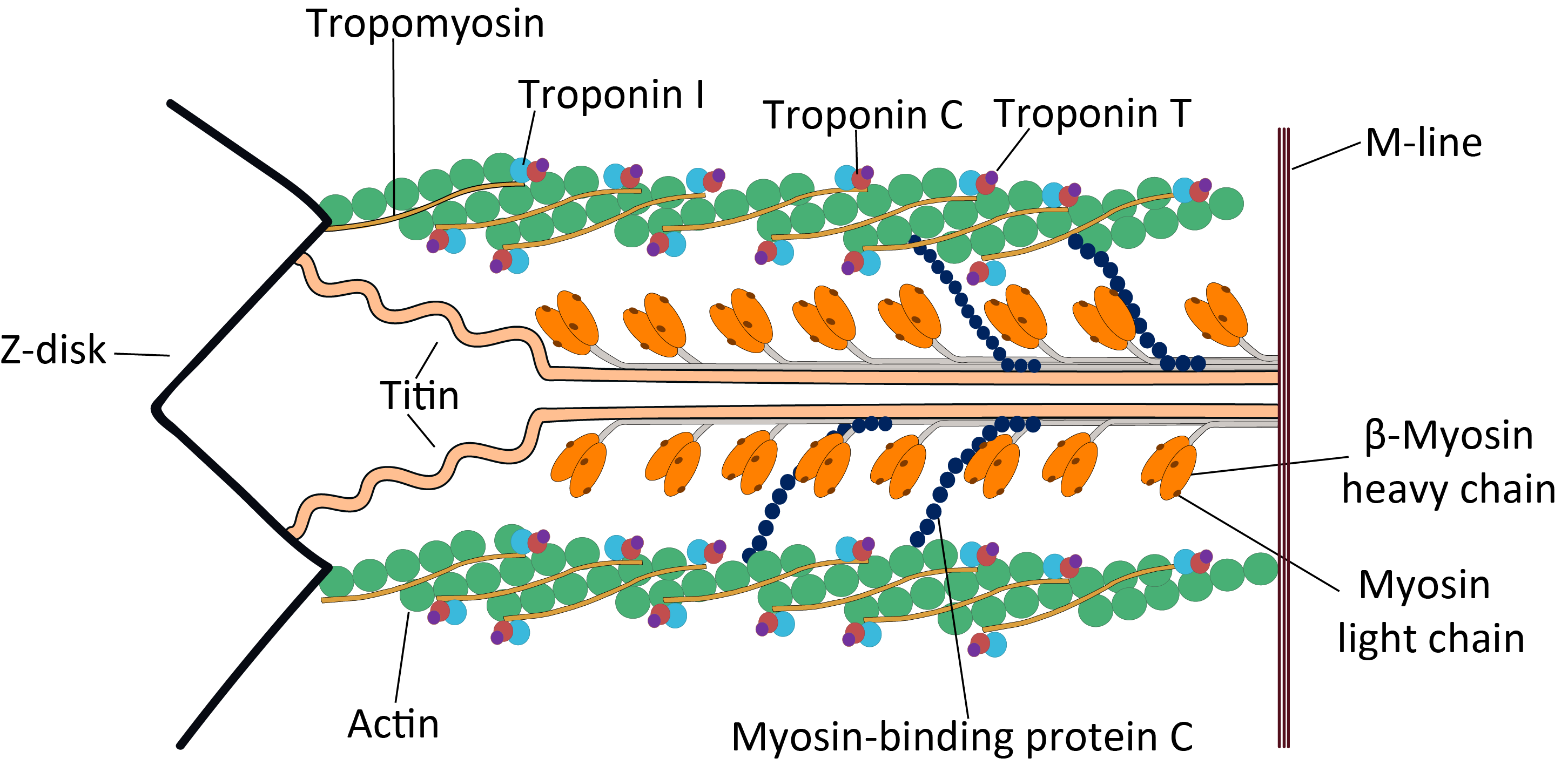
Cardiac sarcomere structure, featuring titin

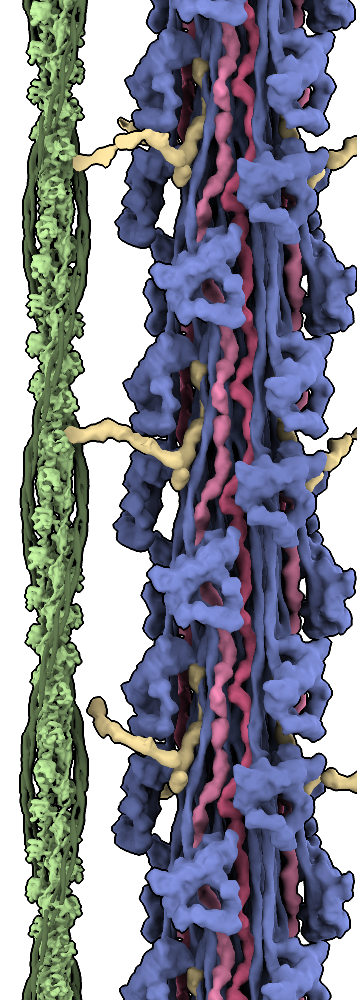
Reconstruction of the thin (green) and thick filament from mammalian cardiac tissue. Myosin is in blue, MyBP-C is in yellow, and titin is in two shades of red (dark red for titin-alpha and light red for titin-beta).

Titin (/ˈtaɪtɪn/; also called connectin) is a protein that in humans is encoded by the TTN gene. The protein, which is over 1 μm in length, functions as a molecular spring that is responsible for the passive elasticity of muscle. It comprises 244 individually folded protein domains connected by unstructured peptide sequences. These domains unfold when the protein is stretched and refold when the tension is removed.

Titin is used in the contraction of striated muscle tissues. It connects the Z disc to the M line in the sarcomere. The protein contributes to force transmission at the Z disc and resting tension in the I band region. It limits the range of motion of the sarcomere in tension, thus contributing to the passive stiffness of muscle. Variations in the sequence of titin between different types of striated muscle (cardiac or skeletal) have been correlated with differences in the mechanical properties of these muscles.

Titin is the third most abundant protein in muscle (after myosin and actin), and an adult human contains approximately 0.5 kg of titin. With its length of ~27,000 to ~35,000 amino acids (depending on the splice isoform), titin is the largest known protein. Furthermore, the gene for titin contains the largest number of exons (363) discovered in any single gene, as well as the longest single exon (17,106 bp)

== Discovery ==
In 1954, Reiji Natori proposed the existence of an elastic structure in muscle fiber to account for the return to the resting state when muscles are stretched and then released. In 1977, Koscak Maruyama and coworkers isolated an elastic protein from muscle fiber that they called connectin. Two years later, Kuan Wang and coworkers identified a doublet band on electrophoresis gel corresponding to a high molecular weight, elastic protein that they named titin.

In 1991, Siegfried Labeit isolated a partial cDNA clone of titin. Five years later, Labeit and Bernhard Kolmerer determined the cDNA sequence of human cardiac titin. In 2001, Labeit and colleagues determined the complete sequence of the human titin gene.

== Genetics ==
The human gene encoding for titin is located on the long arm of chromosome 2 and contains 363 exons, which together code for 38,138 amino acid residues (4200 kDa). Within the gene are found a large number of PEVK (proline-glutamate-valine-lysine -abundant structural motifs) exons 84 to 99 nucleotides in length, which code for conserved 28- to 33-residue motifs that may represent structural units of the titin PEVK spring. The number of PEVK motifs in the titin gene appears to have increased during evolution, apparently modifying the genomic region responsible for titin's spring properties.

== Isoforms ==
A number of titin isoforms are produced in different striated muscle tissues as a result of alternative splicing. All but one of these isoforms are in the range of ~27,000 to ~36,000 amino acid residues in length. The exception is the small cardiac novex-3 isoform, which is only 5,604 amino acid residues in length. The following table lists the known titin isoforms:

Isoform	Alias/description	Length (aa)	Molecular weight (Da)
Q8WZ42-1	The "canonical" sequence	34,350	3,816,030
Q8WZ42-2		34,258	3,805,708
Q8WZ42-3	Small cardiac N2-B	26,926	2,992,939
Q8WZ42-4	Soleus	33,445	3,716,027
Q8WZ42-5		32,900	3,653,085
Q8WZ42-6	Small cardiac novex-3	5,604	631,567
Q8WZ42-7	Cardiac novex-2	33,615	3,734,648
Q8WZ42-8	Cardiac novex-1	34,475	3,829,846
Q8WZ42-9		27,118	3,013,957
Q8WZ42-10		27,051	3,006,755
Q8WZ42-11		33,423	3,713,600
Q8WZ42-12		35,991	3,994,625
Q8WZ42-13		34,484	3,831,069

== Structure ==
Titin is the second largest known protein; its human variant consists of 34,350 amino acids, with the molecular mass of the mature "canonical" isoform of the protein being approximately 3,816,030.05 Da. Its mouse homologue is even larger, comprising 35,213 amino acids with a molecular weight of 3,906,487.6 Da. It has a theoretical isoelectric point of 6.02, and its chemical formula is C_{169,719}H_{270,466}N_{45,688}O_{52,238}S_{911}. It has a theoretical instability index (II) of 42.38, classifying the protein as unstable. The protein's in vivo half-life, the time it takes for half of the amount of protein in a cell to break down after its synthesis in the cell, is predicted to be approximately 30 hours (in mammalian reticulocytes).

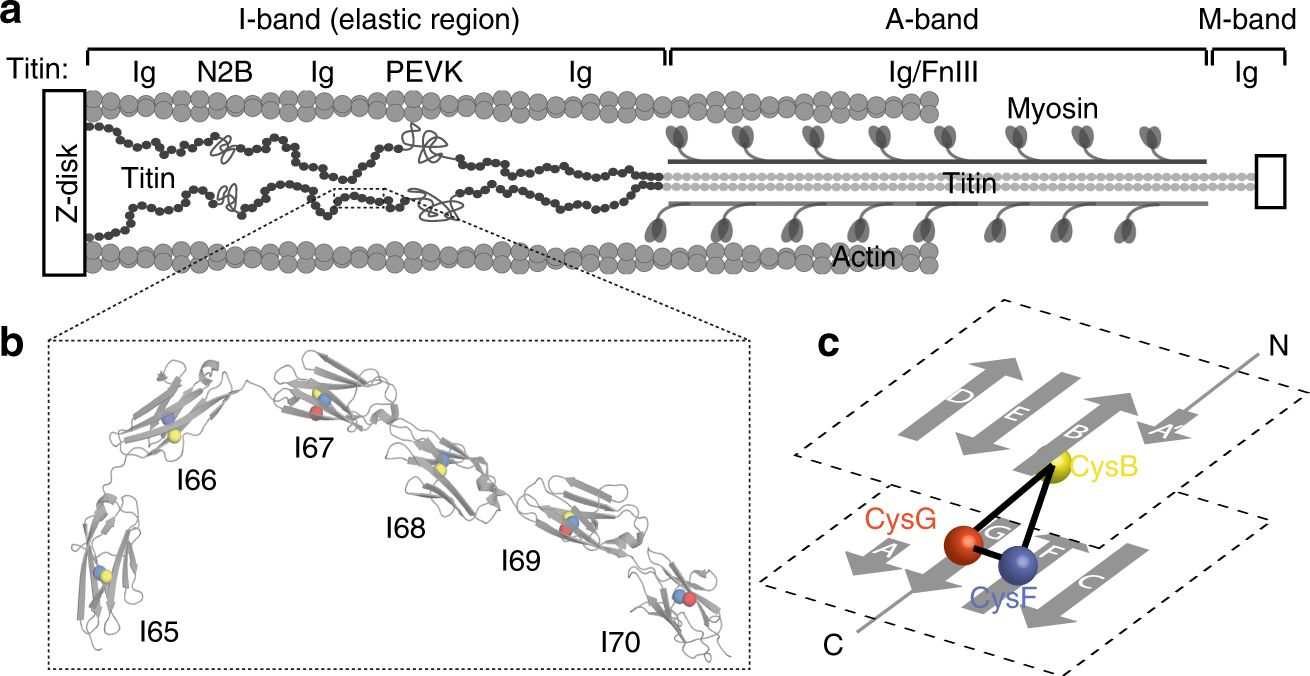
Titin Ig domains. a) Schematic of part of a sarcomere b) Structure of Ig domains c) Topology of Ig domains.

The titin protein is located between the myosin thick filament and the Z disk. Titin consists primarily of a linear array of two types of modules, also referred to as protein domains (244 copies in total): type I fibronectin type III domain (132 copies) and type II immunoglobulin domain (112 copies). However, the exact number of these domains is different in different species. This linear array is further organized into two regions:

- N-terminal I-band: acts as the elastic part of the molecule and is composed mainly of type II modules. More specifically the I-band contains two regions of tandem type II immunoglobulin domains on either side of a PEVK region that is rich in proline (P), glutamate (E), valine (V) and lysine (K).
- C-terminal A-band: is thought to act as a protein-ruler and is composed of alternating type I (Fn3) and II (Ig) modules with super-repeat segments. These have been shown to align to the 43 nm axial repeats of myosin thick filaments with immunoglobulin domains correlating to myosin crowns.

The C-terminal region also contains a serine kinase domain that is primarily known for adapting the muscle to mechanical strain. It is “stretch-sensitive” and helps repair overstretching of the sarcomere. The N-terminal (the Z-disc end) contains a "Z repeat" that recognizes Actinin alpha 2.

The elasticity of the PEVK region has both entropic and enthalpic contributions and is characterized by a polymer persistence length and a stretch modulus. At low to moderate extensions PEVK elasticity can be modeled with a standard worm-like chain (WLC) model of entropic elasticity. At high extensions PEVK stretching can be modeled with a modified WLC model that incorporates enthalpic elasticity. The difference between low-and high- stretch elasticity is due to electrostatic stiffening and hydrophobic effects.

Embedded between the PEVK and Ig residues are N2A domains.

== Evolution ==
The titin domains have evolved from a common ancestor through many gene duplication events. Domain duplication was facilitated by the fact that most domains are encoded by single exons. Other giant sarcomeric proteins made out of Fn3/Ig repeats include obscurin and myomesin. Throughout evolution, titin mechanical strength appears to decrease through the loss of disulfide bonds as the organism becomes heavier.

Titin A-band has homologs in invertebrates, such as twitchin (unc-22) and projectin, which also contain Ig and FNIII repeats and a protein kinase domain. The gene duplication events took place independently but were from the same ancestral Ig and FNIII domains. It is said that the protein titin was the first to diverge out of the family. Drosophila projectin, officially known as bent (bt), is associated with lethality by failing to escape the egg in some mutations as well as dominant changes in wing angles.

Titin repeat

Identifiers
- Symbol: Titin_Ig-rpts
- Pfam: PF06582
- InterPro: IPR010939
Available protein structures:
- PDB: IPR010939 PF06582 (ECOD; PDBsum)
- AlphaFold: IPR010939; PF06582

Drosophila titin, also known as Kettin or sallimus (sls), is kinase-free. It has roles in the elasticity of both muscle and chromosomes. It is homologous to vertebrate titin I-band and contains Ig PEVK domains, the many repeats being a hot target for splicing. There also exists a titin homologue, ttn-1, in C. elegans. It has a kinase domain, some Ig/Fn3 repeats, and PEVT repeats that are similarly elastic.

== Function ==
Sliding filament model of muscle contraction. (Titin labeled at upper right.)

Titin is a large abundant protein of striated muscle. Titin's primary functions are to stabilize the thick filament, center it between the thin filaments, prevent overstretching of the sarcomere, and to recoil the sarcomere like a spring after it is stretched. An N-terminal Z-disc region and a C-terminal M-line region bind to the Z-line and M-line of the sarcomere, respectively, so that a single titin molecule spans half the length of a sarcomere. Titin also contains binding sites for muscle-associated proteins so it serves as an adhesion template for the assembly of contractile machinery in muscle cells. It has also been identified as a structural protein for chromosomes. Considerable variability exists in the I-band, the M-line and the Z-disc regions of titin. Variability in the I-band region contributes to the differences in elasticity of different titin isoforms and, therefore, to the differences in elasticity of different muscle types. Of the many titin variants identified, five are described with complete transcript information available.

Dominant mutation in TTN causes predisposition to hernias.

Titin interacts with many sarcomeric proteins including:

- Z line region: telethonin and alpha-actinin
- I band region: calpain-3 and obscurin
- M line region: myosin-binding protein C, calmodulin 1, CAPN3, and MURF1

== Clinical relevance ==
Mutations anywhere within the unusually long sequence of this gene can cause premature stop codons or other defects. Titin mutations are associated with hereditary myopathy with early respiratory failure, early-onset myopathy with fatal cardiomyopathy, core myopathy with heart disease, centronuclear myopathy, limb-girdle muscular dystrophy type 2J, familial dilated cardiomyopathy 9, hypertrophic cardiomyopathy and tibial muscular dystrophy. Further research also suggests that no genetically linked form of any dystrophy or myopathy can be safely excluded from being caused by a mutation on the TTN gene. Truncating mutations in dilated cardiomyopathy patients are most commonly found in the A region; although truncations in the upstream I region might be expected to prevent translation of the A region entirely, alternative splicing creates some transcripts that do not encounter the premature stop codon, ameliorating its effect. mRNA splicing factors such as RBM20 and SLM2 (KHDRBS3) were shown to mediated alternative mRNA splicing of titin mRNA contributing to the development of heart failure due to cardiomyopathies.

Autoantibodies to titin are produced in patients with the autoimmune disease Myasthenia gravis.

== Interactions ==
Titin has been shown to interact with:

- ANK1,
- ANKRD1,
- ANKRD23
- CAPN3,
- FHL2,
- OBSCN,
- TCAP, and
- TRIM63.

== Linguistic significance ==
The name titin is derived from the Greek Titan (a giant deity, anything of great size). Titin also has the longest IUPAC name of a protein. The full chemical name of the human canonical form of titin, expressed as a sequence of amino acids, which starts methionyl... and ends ...isoleucine, contains 189,819 letters and is sometimes stated to be the longest word in the English language, or of any language. However, lexicographers regard formal names of chemical compounds as verbal formulae rather than English words.

== See also ==
- PKZILLA-1 - new largest known protein with 45,212 amino acids
