= Enaptin =

Protein-coding gene

SYNE1

Identifiers
- Aliases: SYNE1, 8B, ARCA1, C6orf98, CPG2, EDMD4, MYNE1, Nesp1, SCAR8, dJ45H2.2, spectrin repeat containing nuclear envelope protein 1, KASH1, AMCM, AMC3
- External IDs: OMIM: 608441; MGI: 1927152; GeneCards: SYNE1
Available structures
PDB	Ortholog search: PDBe RCSB
PDB	List of PDB id codes 4DXR

Gene location (Human)
Chr.	Chromosome 6 (human)
Band	6q25.2	Start	152,121,687 bp
Band	6q25.2	End	152,637,801 bp

Gene location (Mouse)
Chr.	Chromosome 10 (mouse)
Band	10|10 A1	Start	5,020,917 bp
Band	10|10 A1	End	5,551,482 bp
RNA expression pattern
Bgee	Human / Mouse (ortholog); Top expressed in: cerebellar hemisphere; right hemisphere of cerebellum; Achilles tendon; nucleus accumbens; sural nerve; left ovary; right lung; middle temporal gyrus; caudate nucleus; right frontal lobe / Top expressed in: cerebellar cortex; lobe of cerebellum; cerebellar vermis; granulocyte; habenula; Region I of hippocampus proper; superior frontal gyrus; dentate gyrus; primary visual cortex; dentate gyrus of hippocampal formation granule cell; More reference expression data
BioGPS	n/a
Gene ontology
Molecular function	actin filament binding; protein binding; identical protein binding; actin binding; lamin binding; protein homodimerization activity; enzyme binding; RNA binding
Cellular component	cytoplasm; integral component of membrane; postsynaptic membrane; Golgi apparatus; nuclear membrane; nuclear envelope; membrane; sarcomere; nucleoplasm; meiotic nuclear membrane microtubule tethering complex; nuclear outer membrane; cytoskeleton; nucleus; P-body; nucleolus
Biological process	nuclear matrix anchoring at nuclear membrane; Golgi organization; nucleus organization; muscle cell differentiation; spermatogenesis; cell differentiation
Sources:Amigo / QuickGO
Orthologs
Databases	NCBI: entry; OMA: entry
Species	Human	Mouse
Entrez	23345	64009
Ensembl	ENSG00000131018	ENSMUSG00000096054
UniProt	Q8NF91	Q6ZWR6
RefSeq (mRNA)	NM_001099267; NM_001134379; NM_015293; NM_033071; NM_133650 NM_182961; NM_001347701; NM_001347702	NM_001079686; NM_022027; NM_153399; NM_001347711; NM_001347732
RefSeq (protein)	NP_001334630; NP_001334631; NP_149062; NP_892006	NP_001073154; NP_001334640; NP_001334661; NP_071310; NP_700448
Location (UCSC)	Chr 6: 152.12 – 152.64 Mb	Chr 10: 5.02 – 5.55 Mb
PubMed search
- Wikidata
View/Edit Human	View/Edit Mouse

Enaptin also known as nesprin-1 or synaptic nuclear envelope protein 1 (syne-1) is an actin-binding protein that in humans that is encoded by the SYNE1 gene.

== Function ==
This gene encodes a spectrin repeat containing protein expressed in skeletal and smooth muscle, and peripheral blood lymphocytes, that localizes to the nuclear membrane.

Enaptin is a nuclear envelope protein found in human myocytes and synapses, which is made up of 8,797 amino acids. Enaptin is involved in the maintenance of nuclear organization and structural integrity, tethering the cell nucleus to the cytoskeleton by interacting with the nuclear envelope and with F-actin in the cytoplasm.

== Structure ==
Enaptin contains a coiled alpha-helical region and a large beta-sheet region in the upper part and at least four alpha-helices spliced together, indicating the similarity with collagen. The protein is made up of three main parts, as can be seen in the diagram: cytoplasmic (1-8746), anchor for type IV membrane protein (8747-8767), and the sequence for perinuclear space (8768-8797). The region in the perinuclear space contains a KASH domain.

The molecular weight of the mature protein is approximately 1,011 kDa, and it has a theoretical pI of 5.38. The protein's chemical formula is C_{44189}H_{71252}N_{12428}O_{14007}S_{321}. It has a theoretical Instability Index (II) of 51.63, indicating that it would be unstable in a test tube. The protein's in vivo half-life, the time it takes for half of the amount of protein in a cell to disappear after its synthesis in the cell, is predicted to be approximately 30 hours (in mammalian reticulocytes).

== Clinical significance ==
Mutations in this gene have been associated with autosomal recessive spinocerebellar ataxia 8, also referred to as autosomal recessive cerebellar ataxia type 1 or recessive ataxia of Beauce.
