= Y-box-binding protein 1 =

Protein found in humans

YBX1
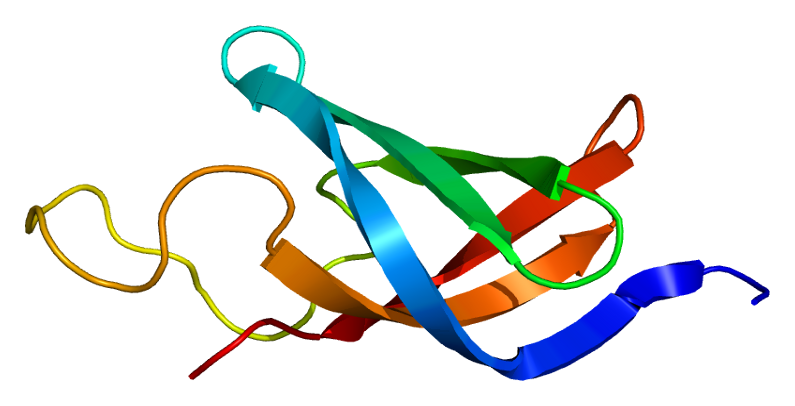

Identifiers
- Aliases: YBX1, BP-8, CSDA2, CSDB, DBPB, MDR-NF1, NSEP-1, NSEP1, YB-1, YB1, CBF-A, EFI-A, Y-box binding protein 1
- External IDs: OMIM: 154030; MGI: 99146; GeneCards: YBX1
Available structures
PDB	Ortholog search: PDBe RCSB
PDB	List of PDB id codes 1H95

Gene location (Human)
Chr.	Chromosome 1 (human)
Band	1p34.2	Start	42,682,418 bp
Band	1p34.2	End	42,703,805 bp

Gene location (Mouse)
Chr.	Chromosome 4 (mouse)
Band	4|4 D2.1	Start	119,135,178 bp
Band	4|4 D2.1	End	119,151,801 bp
RNA expression pattern
Bgee	Human / Mouse (ortholog); Top expressed in: left testis; right testis; ganglionic eminence; ventricular zone; Achilles tendon; gastrocnemius muscle; muscle of thigh; skeletal muscle tissue; left ventricle; stromal cell of endometrium / Top expressed in: Ileal epithelium; primitive streak; tail of embryo; abdominal wall; medial ganglionic eminence; endothelial cell of lymphatic vessel; seminiferous tubule; choroid plexus of fourth ventricle; migratory enteric neural crest cell; maxillary prominence; More reference expression data
BioGPS	n/a
Gene ontology
Molecular function	DNA binding; DNA-binding transcription factor activity; DNA-binding transcription activator activity, RNA polymerase II-specific; RNA polymerase II cis-regulatory region sequence-specific DNA binding; protein binding; RNA binding; nucleic acid binding; GTPase binding; double-stranded DNA binding; single-stranded DNA binding; chromatin binding; DNA-binding transcription factor activity, RNA polymerase II-specific
Cellular component	cytoplasm; CRD-mediated mRNA stability complex; nuclear membrane; intracellular membrane-bounded organelle; U12-type spliceosomal complex; nucleoplasm; extracellular region; cytoplasmic stress granule; extracellular exosome; nucleus; histone pre-mRNA 3'end processing complex; cytosol; ribonucleoprotein complex
Biological process	CRD-mediated mRNA stabilization; mRNA splicing, via spliceosome; regulation of transcription, DNA-templated; mRNA processing; transcription by RNA polymerase II; protein localization to cytoplasmic stress granule; transcription, DNA-templated; positive regulation of cell division; positive regulation of transcription by RNA polymerase II; in utero embryonic development; RNA splicing; negative regulation of striated muscle cell differentiation; negative regulation of transcription by RNA polymerase II; Notch signaling pathway; cellular response to interleukin-7
Sources:Amigo / QuickGO
Orthologs
Databases	NCBI: entry; OMA: entry
Species	Human	Mouse
Entrez	4904	22608
Ensembl	ENSG00000065978	ENSMUSG00000028639
UniProt	P67809	P62960
RefSeq (mRNA)	NM_004559	NM_011732
RefSeq (protein)	NP_004550	NP_035862
Location (UCSC)	Chr 1: 42.68 – 42.7 Mb	Chr 4: 119.14 – 119.15 Mb
PubMed search
- Wikidata
View/Edit Human	View/Edit Mouse

Y box binding protein 1 (YB-1), also known as Y-box transcription factor or nuclease-sensitive element-binding protein 1, is a protein that in humans is encoded by the YBX1 gene. YBX1 is an RNA binding protein that stabilises messenger RNAs modified with N6-methyladenosine.

== Clinical significance ==
YBX1 is a potential drug target in cancer therapy. YB-1 helps the replication of adenovirus type 5, a commonly used vector in gene therapy. Thus, YB-1 can cause an "oncolytic" effect in YB-1 positive cancer cells treated with adenoviruses.

== DNA repair ==
The mitochondria of human cells possess a repair pathway for DNA base pair mismatches that is distinct from the DNA mismatch repair pathway of the nucleus. This mitochondrial pathway includes participation of Y box binding protein 1 (designated YB-1 or YBX1), that likely acts in the mismatch binding and recognition steps of mismatch repair.

== Interactions ==
Y box binding protein 1 has been shown to interact with:

- ANKRD2,
- CTCF,
- P53,
- PCNA,
- RBBP6, and
- SFRS9.
