= TRIM63 =

Protein-coding gene in humans

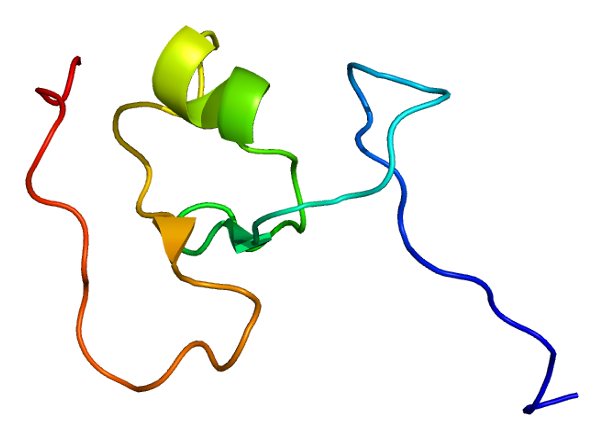

Identifiers
- Aliases: TRIM63, IRF, MURF1, MURF2, RNF28, SMRZ, tripartite motif containing 63
- External IDs: OMIM: 606131; MGI: 2447992; GeneCards: TRIM63
Available structures
PDB	Ortholog search: PDBe RCSB
PDB	List of PDB id codes 3DDT, 4M3L, 2D8U
Enzyme activity
EC #	BRENDA	ExPASy	KEGG	MetaCyc
2.3.2.27	↗	↗	↗	↗

Gene location (Human)
Chr.	Chromosome 1 (human)
Band	1p36.11	Start	26,051,301 bp
Band	1p36.11	End	26,068,436 bp

Gene location (Mouse)
Chr.	Chromosome 4 (mouse)
Band	4|4 D2.3	Start	134,042,431 bp
Band	4|4 D2.3	End	134,056,940 bp
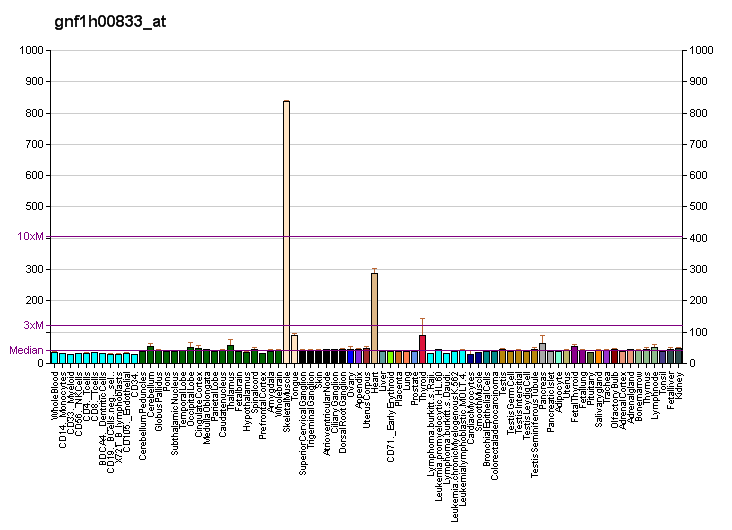
RNA expression pattern
Bgee	Human / Mouse (ortholog); Top expressed in: gastrocnemius muscle; tibialis anterior muscle; muscle of thigh; quadriceps femoris muscle; vastus lateralis muscle; deltoid muscle; Skeletal muscle tissue of rectus abdominis; biceps brachii; myocardium of left ventricle; Skeletal muscle tissue of biceps brachii / Top expressed in: muscle of thigh; knee joint; tibialis anterior muscle; triceps brachii muscle; medial head of gastrocnemius muscle; soleus muscle; vastus lateralis muscle; temporal muscle; sternocleidomastoid muscle; digastric muscle; More reference expression data
BioGPS	More reference expression data
Gene ontology
Molecular function	zinc ion binding; protein binding; titin binding; signal transducer activity; metal ion binding; ubiquitin-protein transferase activity; transferase activity
Cellular component	cytoplasm; M band; contractile fiber; Z discdkac; microtubule; nucleus; intracellular anatomical structure
Biological process	skeletal muscle atrophy; muscle contraction; response to glucocorticoid; response to interleukin-1; protein ubiquitination; response to electrical stimulus involved in regulation of muscle adaptation; signal transduction; negative regulation of cardiac muscle hypertrophy
Sources:Amigo / QuickGO
Orthologs
Databases	NCBI: entry; OMA: entry
Species	Human	Mouse
Entrez	84676	433766
Ensembl	ENSG00000158022	ENSMUSG00000028834
UniProt	Q969Q1	Q38HM4
RefSeq (mRNA)	NM_032588	NM_001039048; NM_001369245
RefSeq (protein)	NP_115977	n/a
Location (UCSC)	Chr 1: 26.05 – 26.07 Mb	Chr 4: 134.04 – 134.06 Mb
PubMed search
- Wikidata
View/Edit Human	View/Edit Mouse

E3 ubiquitin-protein ligase TRIM63, also known as "MuRF1" (Muscle Ring-Finger Protein-1), is an enzyme that in humans is encoded by the TRIM63 gene.

This gene encodes a member of the RING zinc finger protein family found in striated muscle and iris. The product of this gene is localized to the Z-line and M-line lattices of myofibrils, where titin's N-terminal and C-terminal regions respectively bind to the sarcomere. In vitro binding studies have shown that this protein also binds directly to titin near the region of titin containing kinase activity. Another member of this protein family binds to microtubules. Since these family members can form heterodimers, this suggests that these proteins may serve as a link between titin kinase and microtubule-dependent signal pathways in muscle.

The protein encoded by the Trim63 gene is also called MuRF1. MuRF1 is the name most commonly used in the literature, and it stands for "Muscle RING Finger 1." Structurally, there are two closely related MuRFs, MuRF2 and MuRF3. These also have TRIM codes: MuRF2 is TRIM55; MuRF3 is TRIM54.

== Interactions ==
Trim63/MuRF1 has been shown to be an E3 ubiquitin ligase. Its major substrate is Myosin Heavy Chain (MHC, or Myosin-2, or MYH2), meaning it induces the proteasome-mediated degradation of MHC, by causing MHC to be ubiquitinated. MuRF1 is upregulated during skeletal muscle atrophy – and thus the degradation of myosin heavy chain, which is a major component of the sarcomere, is an important mechanism in the breakdown of skeletal muscle under atrophy conditions MuRF1 has been shown to be upregulated during denervation, administration of glucocorticoids, immobilization, and casting (when a cast is applied to a limb, in order to immobilize it). All of these settings cause skeletal muscle atrophy.

TRIM63/MuRF1 has been shown to interact with Titin, GMEB1 and SUMO2.

== Regulation during skeletal muscle atrophy ==
During settings of skeletal muscle atrophy, the levels of Trim63/MuRF1 mRNA increase., leading to breakdown of the sarcomere.

This was found to be due to regulation of gene expression of Trim63/MuRF1 by the FOXO (or Forkhead) family of transcription factors.; see also FOX proteins.

Foxo1 or Foxo3 may regulate MuRF1. These factors are normally kept out of the nucleus by phosphorylation induced by a kinase called Akt. When Akt is inactivated, or less active, Foxo1 or Foxo3 can then transport to the nucleus, and induce expression of MuRF1.

== Clinical significance ==
Recently, it has been suggested that TRIM63/MuRF1 is associated with an autosomal-recessive form of hypertrophic cardiomyopathy (HCM). In this paper, the authors describe that individuals harboring homozygous or compound heterozygous rare variants in TRIM63/MuRF1 show a peculiar HCM phenotype, characterized by concentric left ventricular (LV) hypertrophy (50% of patients) and a high rate of LV dysfunction (20%). This finding suggests that Myosin Heavy Chain levels may be dysregulated in the heart in the absence of MuRF1, leading to pathology.

Upregulation of MuRF1/Trim63 mRNA is regularly used as an indicator that active skeletal muscle atrophy is occurring.
