= Calpain-3 =

Protein found in humans

CAPN3

Identifiers
- Aliases: CAPN3, CANP3, CANPL3, LGMD2, LGMD2A, nCL-1, p94, calpain 3, LGMDR1, LGMDD4
- External IDs: OMIM: 114240; MGI: 107437; GeneCards: CAPN3
Available structures
PDB	Ortholog search: PDBe RCSB
PDB	List of PDB id codes 4OKH
Enzyme activity
EC #	BRENDA	ExPASy	KEGG	MetaCyc
3.4.22.54	↗	↗	↗	↗

Gene location (Human)
Chr.	Chromosome 15 (human)
Band	15q15.1	Start	42,359,498 bp
Band	15q15.1	End	42,412,949 bp

Gene location (Mouse)
Chr.	Chromosome 2 (mouse)
Band	2 E5|2 60.31 cM	Start	120,294,053 bp
Band	2 E5|2 60.31 cM	End	120,335,399 bp

RNA expression pattern
Bgee	Human / Mouse (ortholog); Top expressed in: muscle of thigh; skeletal muscle tissue; C1 segment; corpus callosum; gastrocnemius muscle; substantia nigra; putamen; hippocampus proper; primary visual cortex; caudate nucleus / Top expressed in: lens; muscle of thigh; muscle tissue; skeletal muscle tissue; quadriceps femoris muscle; thymus; zone of skin; esophagus; dentate gyrus of hippocampal formation granule cell; hippocampus proper; More reference expression data
BioGPS	More reference expression data
Gene ontology
Molecular function	calcium ion binding; cysteine-type peptidase activity; sodium ion binding; titin binding; signal transducer activity; metal ion binding; calcium-dependent cysteine-type endopeptidase activity; peptidase activity; catalytic activity; protein binding; molecular adaptor activity; structural constituent of muscle; hydrolase activity; ligase regulator activity
Cellular component	cytoplasm; cytosol; T-tubule; plasma membrane; intracellular anatomical structure; myofibril; Z discdkac; nucleus; protein-containing complex
Biological process	muscle structure development; cellular response to calcium ion; protein localization to membrane; negative regulation of protein sumoylation; positive regulation of satellite cell activation involved in skeletal muscle regeneration; muscle cell cellular homeostasis; muscle organ development; self proteolysis; negative regulation of apoptotic process; positive regulation of release of sequestered calcium ion into cytosol; proteolysis; positive regulation of transcription, DNA-templated; response to calcium ion; negative regulation of skeletal muscle cell differentiation; G1 to G0 transition involved in cell differentiation; cellular response to salt stress; myofibril assembly; regulation of myoblast differentiation; positive regulation of NF-kappaB transcription factor activity; positive regulation of proteolysis; regulation of catalytic activity; negative regulation of transcription, DNA-templated; sarcomere organization; response to muscle activity; regulation of I-kappaB kinase/NF-kappaB signaling; apoptotic process; signal transduction; programmed cell death; protein-containing complex assembly; protein catabolic process; protein destabilization; calcium-dependent self proteolysis
Sources:Amigo / QuickGO
Orthologs
Databases	NCBI: entry; OMA: entry
Species	Human	Mouse
Entrez	825	12335
Ensembl	ENSG00000092529	ENSMUSG00000079110
UniProt	P20807	Q64691
RefSeq (mRNA)	NM_000070; NM_024344; NM_173087; NM_173088; NM_173089 NM_173090; NM_212465	NM_001109761; NM_001177799; NM_007601
RefSeq (protein)	NP_000061; NP_077320; NP_775110; NP_775111; NP_775112 NP_775113	NP_001103231; NP_001171270; NP_031627
Location (UCSC)	Chr 15: 42.36 – 42.41 Mb	Chr 2: 120.29 – 120.34 Mb
PubMed search
- Wikidata
View/Edit Human	View/Edit Mouse

Calpain-3 is a protein that in humans is encoded by the CAPN3 gene.

== Function ==
Calpain, a heterodimer consisting of a large and a small subunit, is a major intracellular protease, although its function has not been well established. This gene encodes a muscle-specific member of the calpain large subunit family that specifically binds to titin. Mutations in this gene are associated with limb-girdle muscular dystrophies type 2A. Alternate promoters and alternative splicing result in multiple transcript variants encoding different isoforms and some variants are ubiquitously expressed.

In melanocytic cells CAPN3 gene expression may be regulated by MITF.

== Interactions ==
CAPN3 has been shown to interact with Titin.
