= ANKRD23 =

Protein-coding gene in humans

Identifiers
- Aliases: ANKRD23, DARP, MARP3, ankyrin repeat domain 23
- External IDs: OMIM: 610736; MGI: 1925571; GeneCards: ANKRD23

Gene location (Human)
Chr.	Chromosome 2 (human)
Band	2q11.2	Start	96,824,526 bp
Band	2q11.2	End	96,857,934 bp

Gene location (Mouse)
Chr.	Chromosome 1 (mouse)
Band	1|1 B	Start	36,569,269 bp
Band	1|1 B	End	36,575,964 bp
RNA expression pattern
Bgee	Human / Mouse (ortholog); Top expressed in: muscle of thigh; gastrocnemius muscle; sural nerve; tibialis anterior muscle; skeletal muscle tissue; quadriceps femoris muscle; vastus lateralis muscle; right uterine tube; apex of heart; biceps brachii / Top expressed in: quadriceps femoris muscle; muscle tissue; muscle of thigh; skeletal muscle tissue; esophagus; zone of skin; lip; heart; adrenal gland; neural layer of retina; More reference expression data
BioGPS	n/a
Gene ontology
Molecular function	titin binding
Cellular component	myofibril; nucleus; intercalated disc; nucleoplasm; actin cytoskeleton; cytosol
Biological process	response to mechanical stimulus
Sources:Amigo / QuickGO
Orthologs
Databases	NCBI: entry; OMA: entry
Species	Human	Mouse
Entrez	200539	78321
Ensembl	ENSG00000163126	ENSMUSG00000067653
UniProt	Q86SG2	Q812A3
RefSeq (mRNA)	NM_144994	NM_153502; NM_001310521
RefSeq (protein)	NP_659431	NP_001297450; NP_705722
Location (UCSC)	Chr 2: 96.82 – 96.86 Mb	Chr 1: 36.57 – 36.58 Mb
PubMed search
- Wikidata
View/Edit Human	View/Edit Mouse

Ankyrin repeat domain-containing protein 23 is a protein that in humans is encoded by the ANKRD23 gene.

This gene is a member of the muscle ankyrin repeat protein (MARP) family and encodes a protein with four tandem ankyrin-like repeats. The protein is localized to the nucleus, functioning as a transcriptional regulator. Expression of this protein is induced during recovery following starvation.

== Interactions ==
ANKRD23 has been shown to interact with Titin and MYPN.
