= Instability index =

The Instability index is a measure of proteins, used to determine whether it will be stable in a test tube.

If the index is less than 40, then it is probably stable in the test tube. If it is greater (for example, enaptin) then it is probably not stable.
