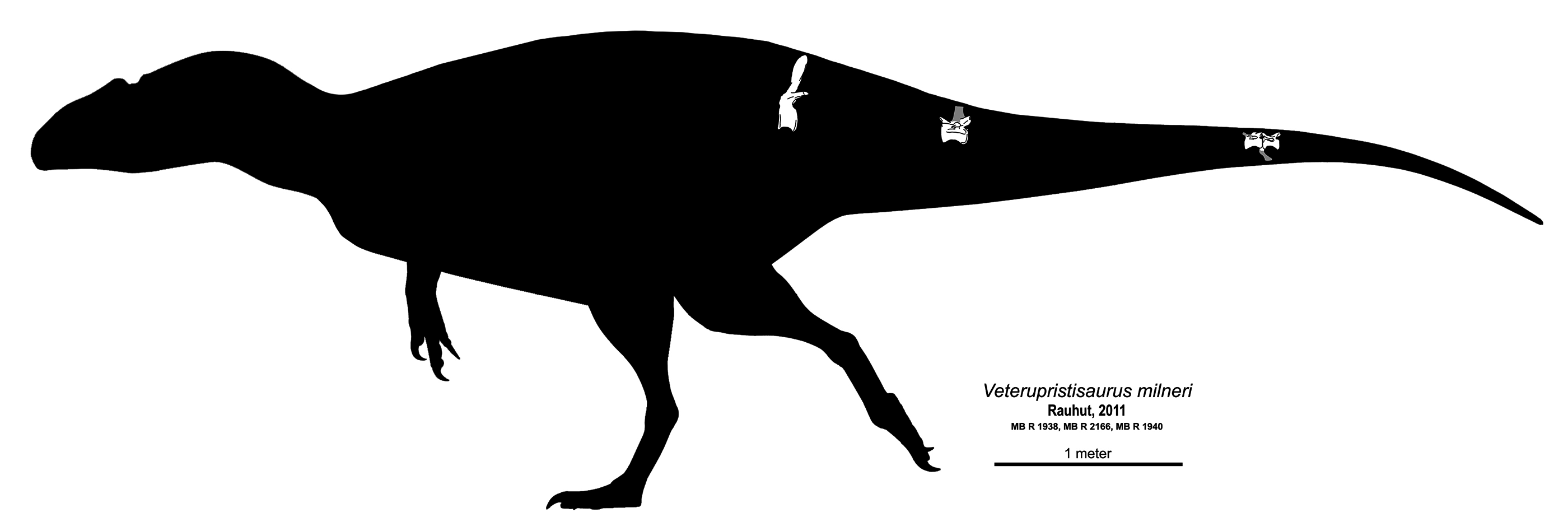
- Skeletal diagram showing known remains

Scientific classification
- Kingdom: Animalia
- Phylum: Chordata
- Class: Reptilia
- Clade: Dinosauria
- Clade: Saurischia
- Clade: Theropoda
- Clade: †Carcharodontosauria
- Family: †Carcharodontosauridae
- Genus: †Veterupristisaurus; Rauhut, 2011
- Species: †V. milneri

Binomial name
- †Veterupristisaurus milneri Rauhut, 2011

Synonyms
- Ceratosaurus? roechlingi Janensch, 1925

= Veterupristisaurus =

Veterupristisaurus Temporal range: Kimmeridgian to Tithonian, Late Jurassic, 154–150 Ma

Genus of carcharodontosaurid theropod dinosaur from the Late Jurassic period

Veterupristisaurus is an extinct genus of carcharodontosaurid theropod dinosaur known from the Jurassic of Tendaguru, Lindi Region of southeastern Tanzania.

== Discovery and naming ==
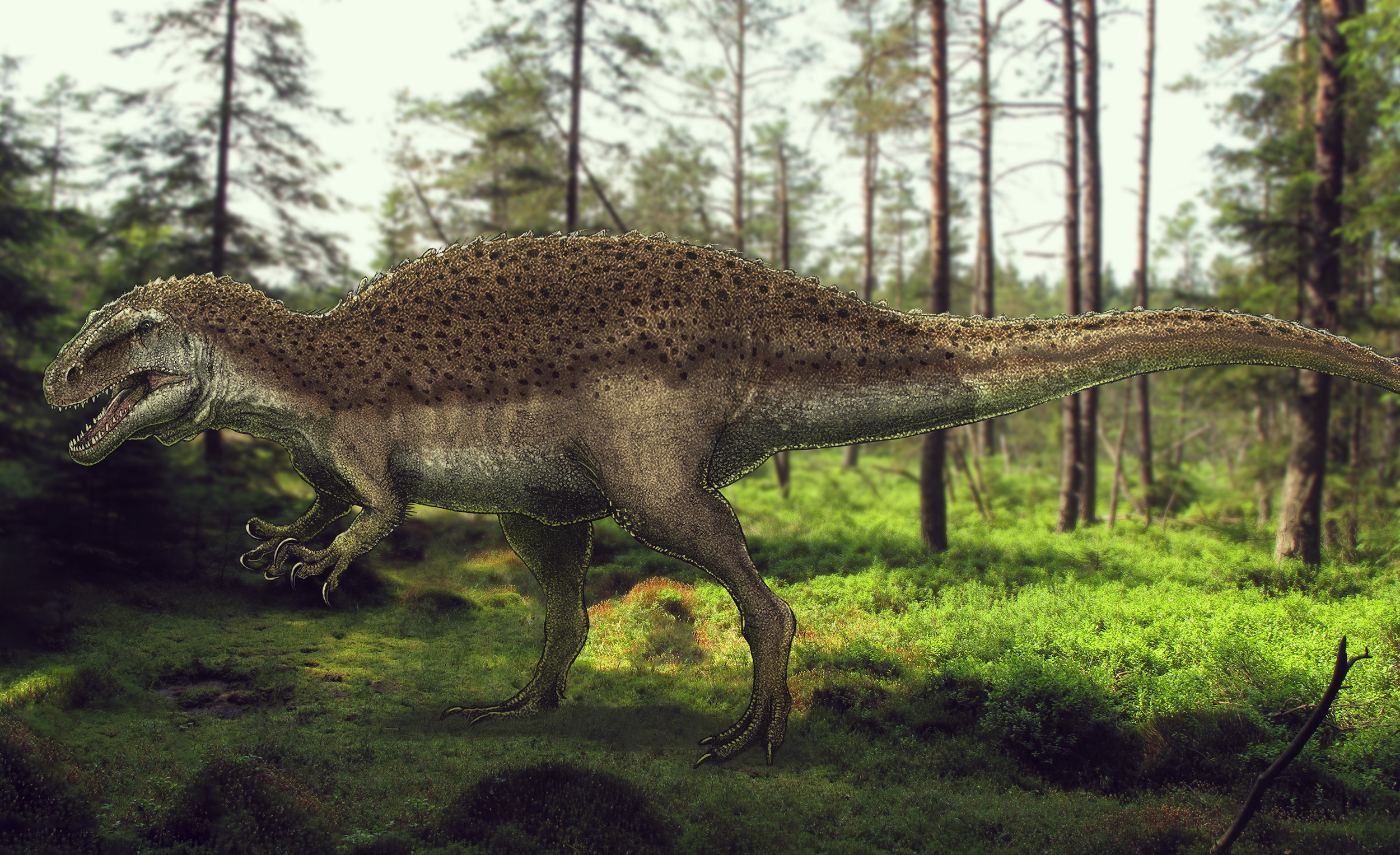
Speculative life restoration

Veterupristisaurus is known from the holotype specimen MB R 1938, an isolated middle caudal vertebra. Two partially fused posterior middle caudal vertebrae, MB R 2166, from the same locality as the holotype, are referred to this genus and most probably came from the same individual. The anterior caudal vertebra, MB R 1940, may also represent this genus. The holotype was collected in the St (EH) locality of the Tendaguru in German East Africa, from the Middle Dinosaur Member of the Tendaguru Formation, dating to the late Kimmeridgian to earliest Tithonian faunal stage of the Late Jurassic, about 154-150 million years ago. The holotype was originally referred to Ceratosaurus? roechlingi by Werner Janensch in 1925.

Veterupristisaurus was named by Oliver W. M. Rauhut in 2011 and the type species is Veterupristisaurus milneri. The generic name translates as "old shark lizard". It refers to the fact that Veterupristisaurus is currently the oldest known representative of the "shark-toothed lizards", the carcharodontosaurids. The specific name honours the paleontologist Angela C. Milner.

== Description ==
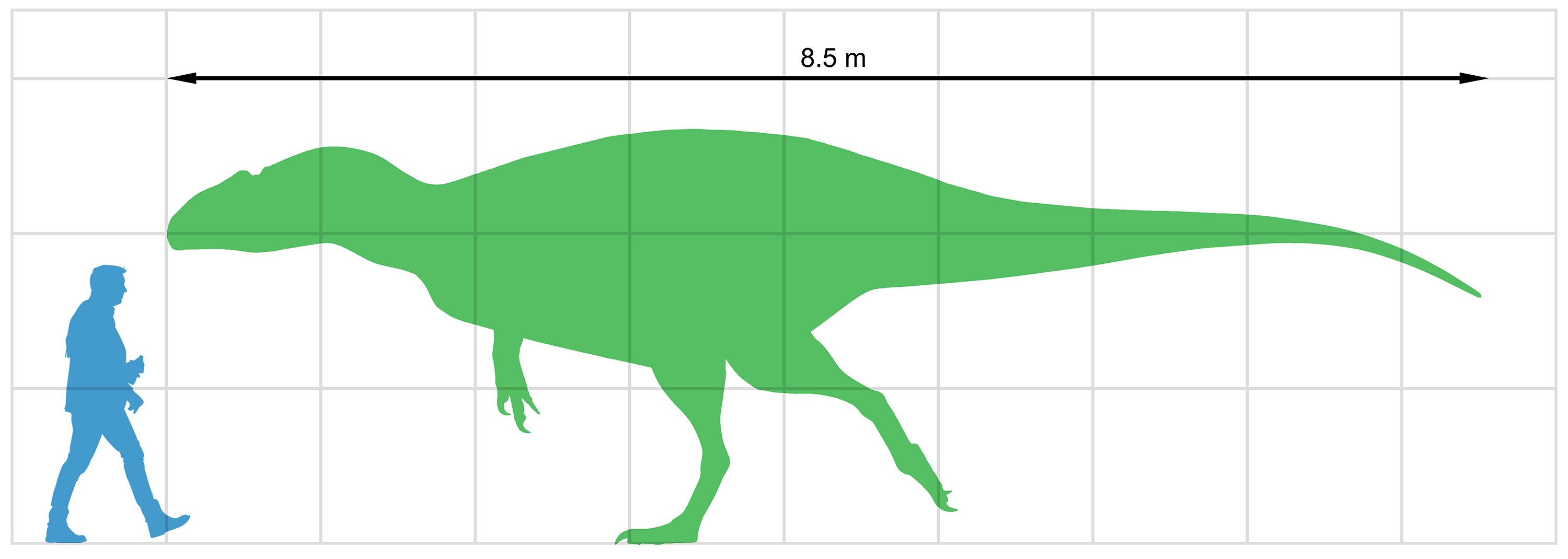
Size of Veterupristisaurus compared to a human

Veterupristisaurus was a large bipedal animal. The length of the holotype vertebra is about 123 mm (4.8 in). Veterupristisaurus has been estimated to have been about 8–11 m (26–36 ft) in length. There are teeth from Tendaguru Formation that probably belong to this taxon. Whether the individual represented by the holotype represents an adult individual cannot be determined based on the available material. It is diagnosed by a spinoprezygapophyseal lamina in the middle caudal vertebrae extending anteriorly to the midwidth of the base of the prezygapophysis and being flanked laterally by a short, parallel lamina extending from the lateral margin of the prezygapophysis posteriorly. Thus, Rauhut considered a sister-group relationship between Veterupristisaurus and Acrocanthosaurus within the Carcharodontosauridae. In 2025, the study that described Tameryraptor, which had Rauhut as a co-author, noted its only diagnostic character was shared with Lusovenator, making the validity of Veterupristisaurus questionable.

== Classification ==
Veterupristisaurus is generally recovered as a member of the Carcharodontosauridae although some studies find it to be a Carcharodontosaurian outside of Carcharodontosauridae instead.

Cau (2024) found Veterupristisaurus to be a carcharodontosaurid forming a clade with Sauroniops, Lusovenator, Eocarcharia, and Concavenator.

- Carcharodontosauridae
  - Neovenator
  - - - Sauroniops
      - Veterupristisaurus
      - Lusovenator
      - Eocarcharia (type skull roof)
      - Concavenator
    - - Carcharodontosaurus iguidensis (holotype maxilla)
      - - Acrocanthosaurus
        - - Eocarcharia (referred maxilla)
          - - - - Meraxes
                - Carcharodontosaurus iguidensis (referred cranial material)
              - - Lajasvenator
                - - Labocania
                  - Shaochilong
            - - - Carcharodontosaurus saharicus (neotype)
                - Carcharodontosaurus saharicus (described by Stromer in 1931)
              - - Tyrannotitan
                - - Mapusaurus
                  - Giganotosaurus

In 2025, the describers of Tameryraptor noted that the main diagnostic character of Veterupristisaurus ("a double spinoprezygapophyseal lamina in the mid-caudal vertebrae") is also seen in Lusovenator, making the validity of Veterupristisaurus questionable.
