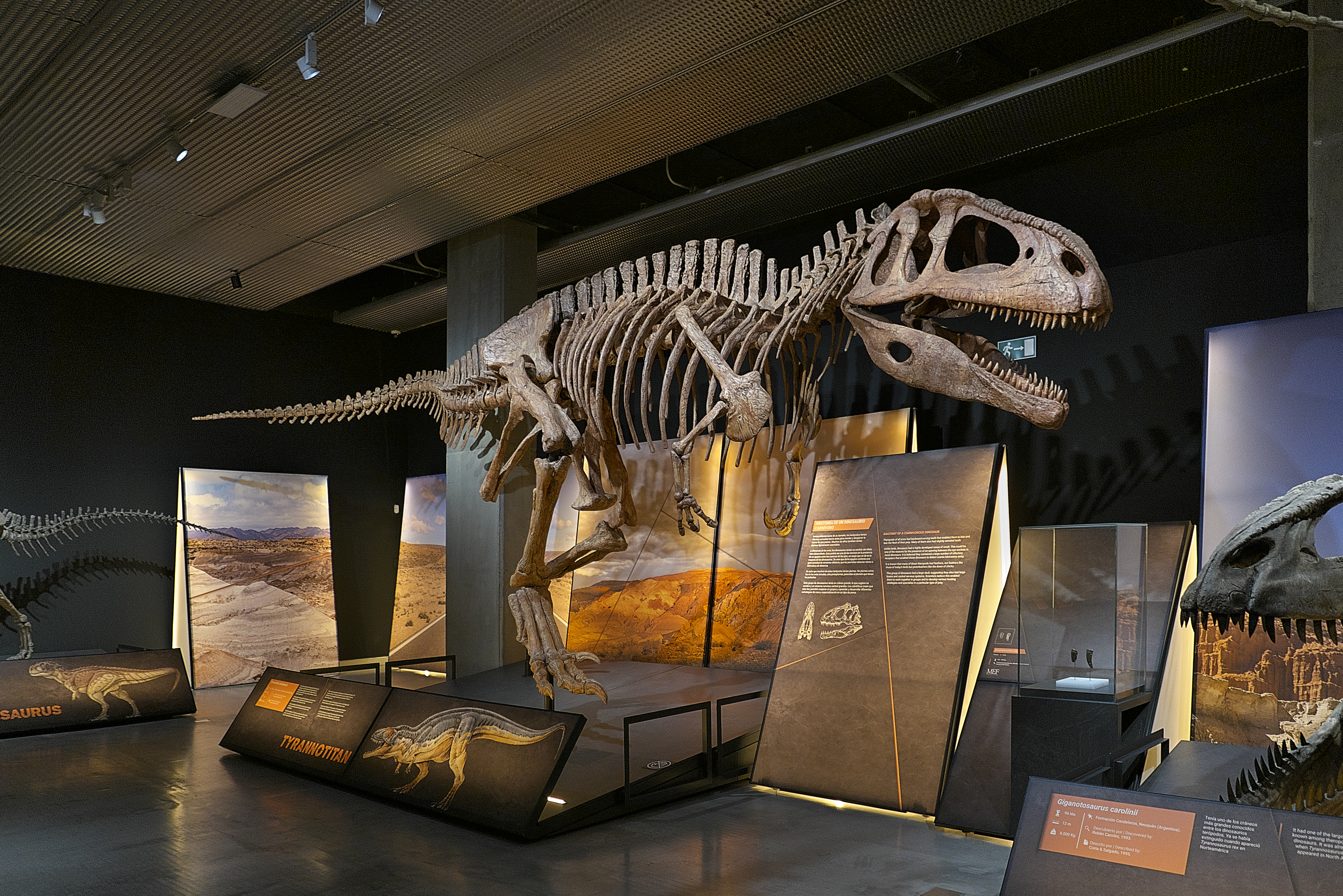
- Reconstructed skeleton in Museo Paleontológico Egidio Feruglio

Scientific classification
- Kingdom: Animalia
- Phylum: Chordata
- Class: Reptilia
- Clade: Dinosauria
- Clade: Saurischia
- Clade: Theropoda
- Family: †Carcharodontosauridae
- Tribe: †Giganotosaurini
- Genus: †Tyrannotitan; Novas et al., 2005

Type species
- †Tyrannotitan chubutensis Novas et al., 2005

= Tyrannotitan =

Tyrannotitan Temporal range: Early Cretaceous (Albian), 110.78–101.62 Ma

Carcharodontosaurid dinosaur genus from the early Cretaceous

Tyrannotitan (/tɪˌrænəˈtaɪtən/; lit. 'tyrant titan') is a genus of large theropod dinosaur belonging to the carcharodontosaurid family. It is known from a single species, T. chubutensis, which lived during the Albian stage of the Early Cretaceous period in what is now Argentina. Tyrannotitan is considered to share a close relationship with other prominent South American carcharodontosaurids such as Giganotosaurus and Mapusaurus. Unlike its relatives, it was bulkier and more robust. This taxon is known from two specimens, both of which are highly incomplete.

== Discovery and species ==
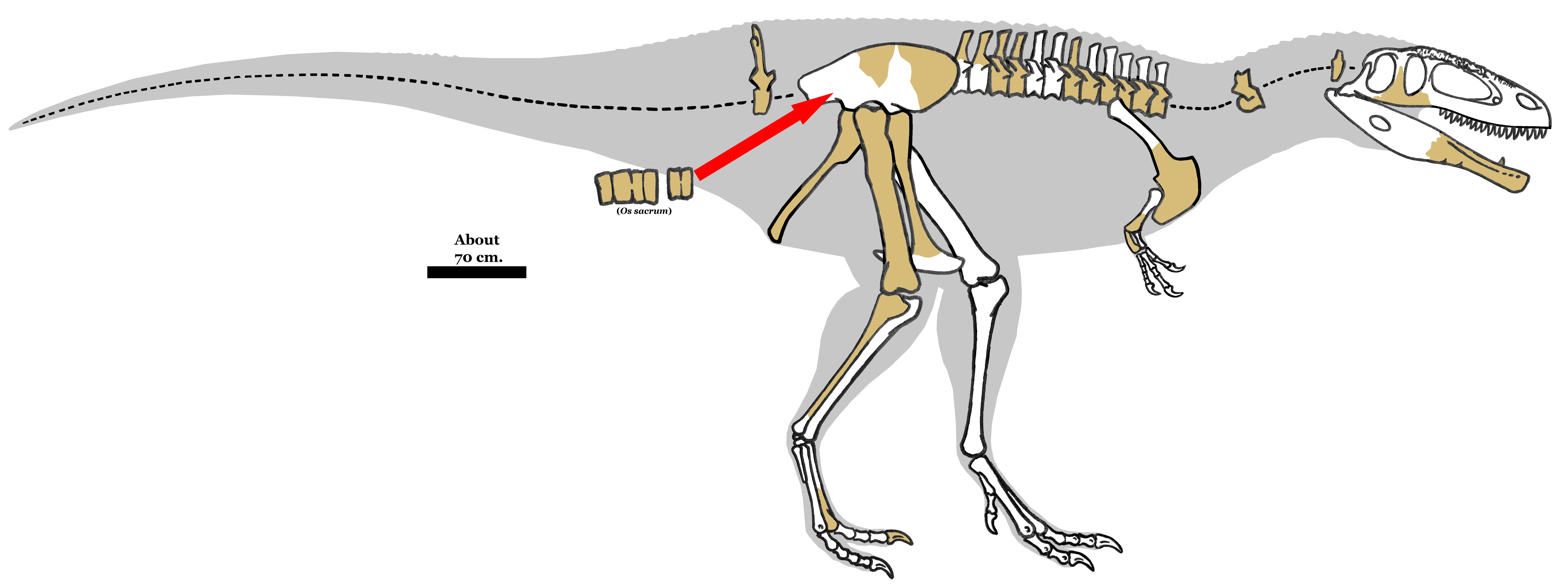
Known remains (in yellow)

Tyrannotitan chubutensis was described by Fernando E. Novas, Silvina de Valais, Pat Vickers-Rich, and Tom Rich in 2005. The fossils were found at La Juanita Farm, 28 kilometres (17 mi) northeast of Paso de Indios, Chubut Province, Argentina. They are believed to have been from the Cerro Castaño Member, Cerro Barcino Formation (Albian stage).

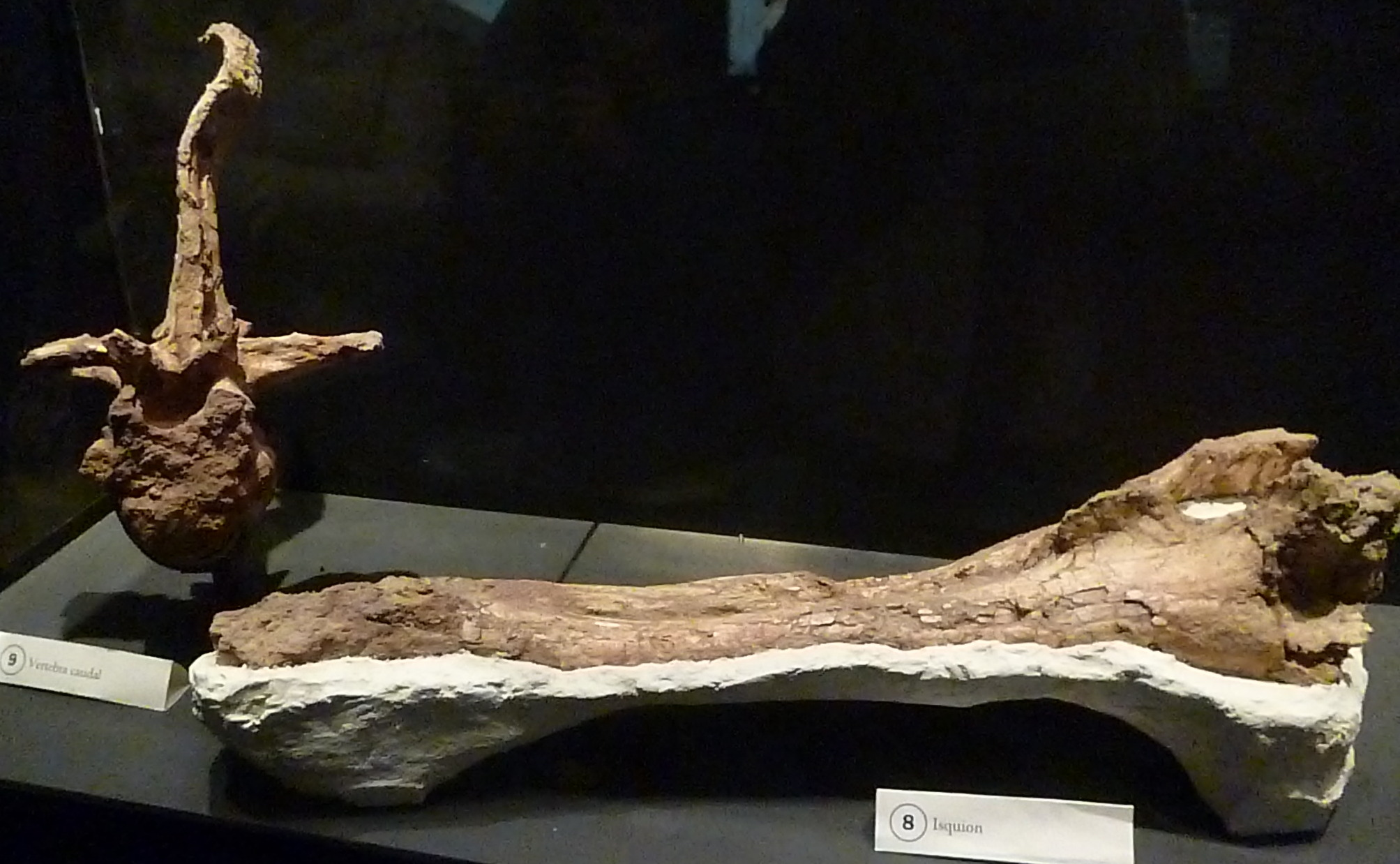
Vertebra and ischium

The holotype material was designated MPEF-PV 1156 and included partial dentaries, teeth, back vertebrae 3–8 and 11–14, proximal tail vertebrae, ribs and chevrons, a fragmentary scapulocoracoid, humerus, ulna, partial ilium, a nearly complete femur, fibula, and left metatarsal 2. Additional material (designated MPEF-PV 1157) included jugals, a right dentary, teeth, atlas vertebra, neck vertebra (?) 9, back vertebrae (?)7, 10, 13, fused sacral centra (5 total), an assortment of distal caudals, ribs, the right femur, a fragmentary left metatarsal 2, pedal phalanges 2-1, 2–2, and 3-3.

== Description ==
Estimated size compared to a human

Tyrannotitan was a large reptile, reaching 11.6 metres (38 ft) in length and 6–7.4 t (6.6–8.2 short tons) in body mass. Its vertebral column is extensively pneumatized, with pneumatic openings in the dorsal and caudal vertebrae resembling those of Giganotosaurus and Mapusaurus. More unusually, Tyrannotitan shows a pneumatic hiatus in the anterior sacral region, a gap in the invasive pneumaticity of different portions of the vertebral column that were pneumatized by independent segments of the respiratory system (air sacs or their diverticula). Such gaps are most commonly observed in juvenile individuals, whose skeletal pneumaticity has not yet fully developed.

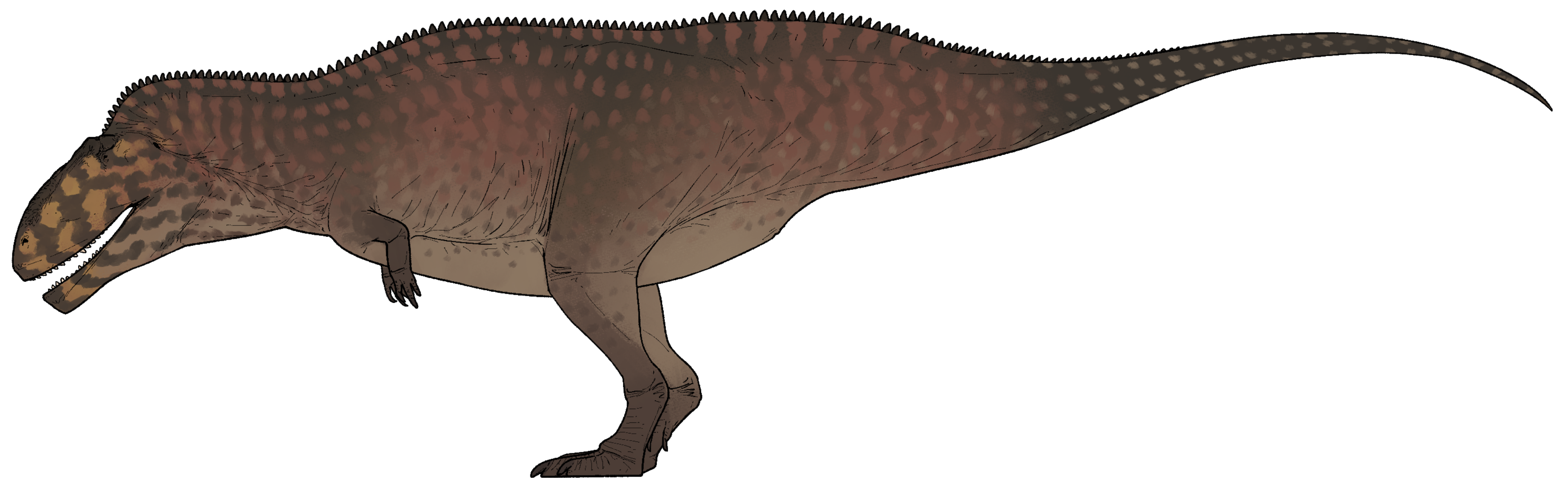
Speculative life restoration of T. chubutensis

The scapulocoracoid is fused, and much better developed than that of Giganotosaurus carolinii, yet the arm is very small. Most of the shaft of the scapula is missing. The acromion curves about 90 degrees from the shaft axis, making it look vaguely tyrannosaurid-like. Whether the sharp difference between taxa is due to evolution or sexual dimorphism in poorly sampled populations of both species, has not been determined (the latter seems unlikely). A proximal caudal has a very tall neural spine (about twice the height of its centrum, judging by the figure). The base of the orbital fenestra is a notch of nearly 90 degrees into the body of the jugal, which contrasts with the rounded base restored for Giganotosaurus and agrees with Carcharodontosaurus favorably. The denticles on its teeth are "chisel-like", and are virtually identical to those of other carcharodontosaurids in having a wrinkled enamel surface, heavily serrated mesial and distal carinae, and labiolingually compressed (laterally flattened) crowns. The femur of the paratype specimen is 1.4 m (4.6 ft) long according to Novas et al. Canale et al. recover Tyrannotitan as deeply nested within the tribe Giganotosaurini as its most basal member. Characteristics that unite the Giganotosaurini include the presence of a postorbital process on the jugal with a wide base, and a derived femur with a weak fourth trochanter and a shallow broad extensor groove at the distal end. The skull length is estimated at 1.22 metres (4.0 ft) in length.

== Classification ==
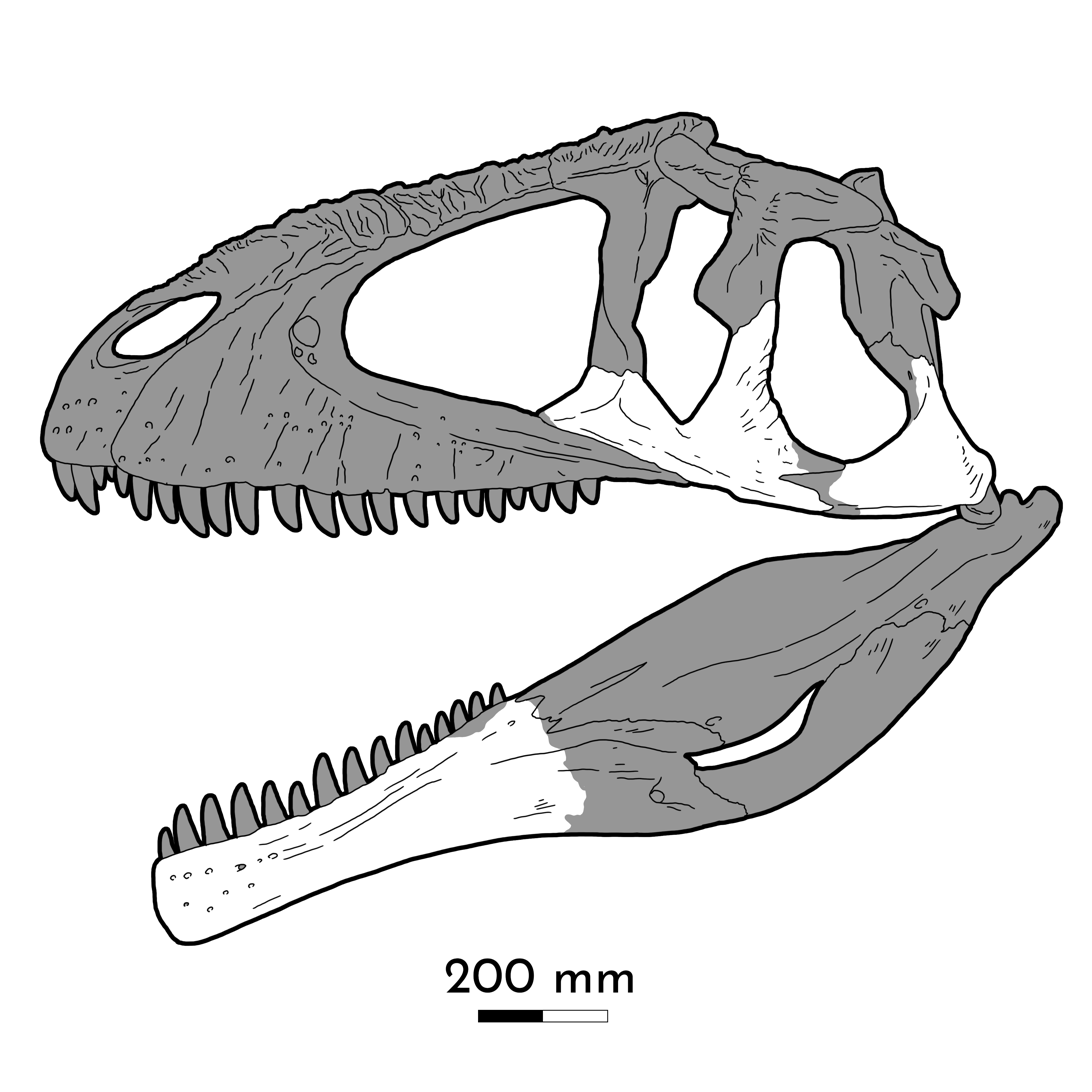
Diagram showing preserved elements of the skull

In their 2022 description of the large carcharodontosaurine Meraxes, Canale et al. placed Tyrannotitan within the clade Giganotosaurini, along with Meraxes, Giganotosaurus, and Mapusaurus. The results of their phylogenetic analyses are shown in the cladogram below:

- Carcharodontosauridae
  - Neovenator
  - - Concavenator
    - Eocarcharia
    - Lajasvenator
    - Lusovenator
    - - Acrocanthosaurus
      - - Shaochilong
        - Carcharodontosaurinae
          - Carcharodontosaurus spp.
          - Giganotosaurini
            - Meraxes
            - - Tyrannotitan
              - - Giganotosaurus
                - Mapusaurus

In his 2024 review of theropod relationships, Cau found similar relationships for Tyrannotitan. His results are shown below:

- Carcharodontosauridae
  - Neovenator
  - - - Sauroniops
      - Veterupristisaurus
      - Lusovenator
      - Eocarcharia (type skull roof)
      - Concavenator
    - - Carcharodontosaurus iguidensis (holotype maxilla)
      - - Acrocanthosaurus
        - - Eocarcharia (referred maxilla)
          - - - - Meraxes
                - Carcharodontosaurus iguidensis (referred cranial material)
              - - Lajasvenator
                - - Labocania
                  - Shaochilong
            - - - Carcharodontosaurus saharicus (neotype)
                - Carcharodontosaurus saharicus (described by Stromer in 1931)
              - - Tyrannotitan
                - - Mapusaurus
                  - Giganotosaurus

== Paleoecology ==
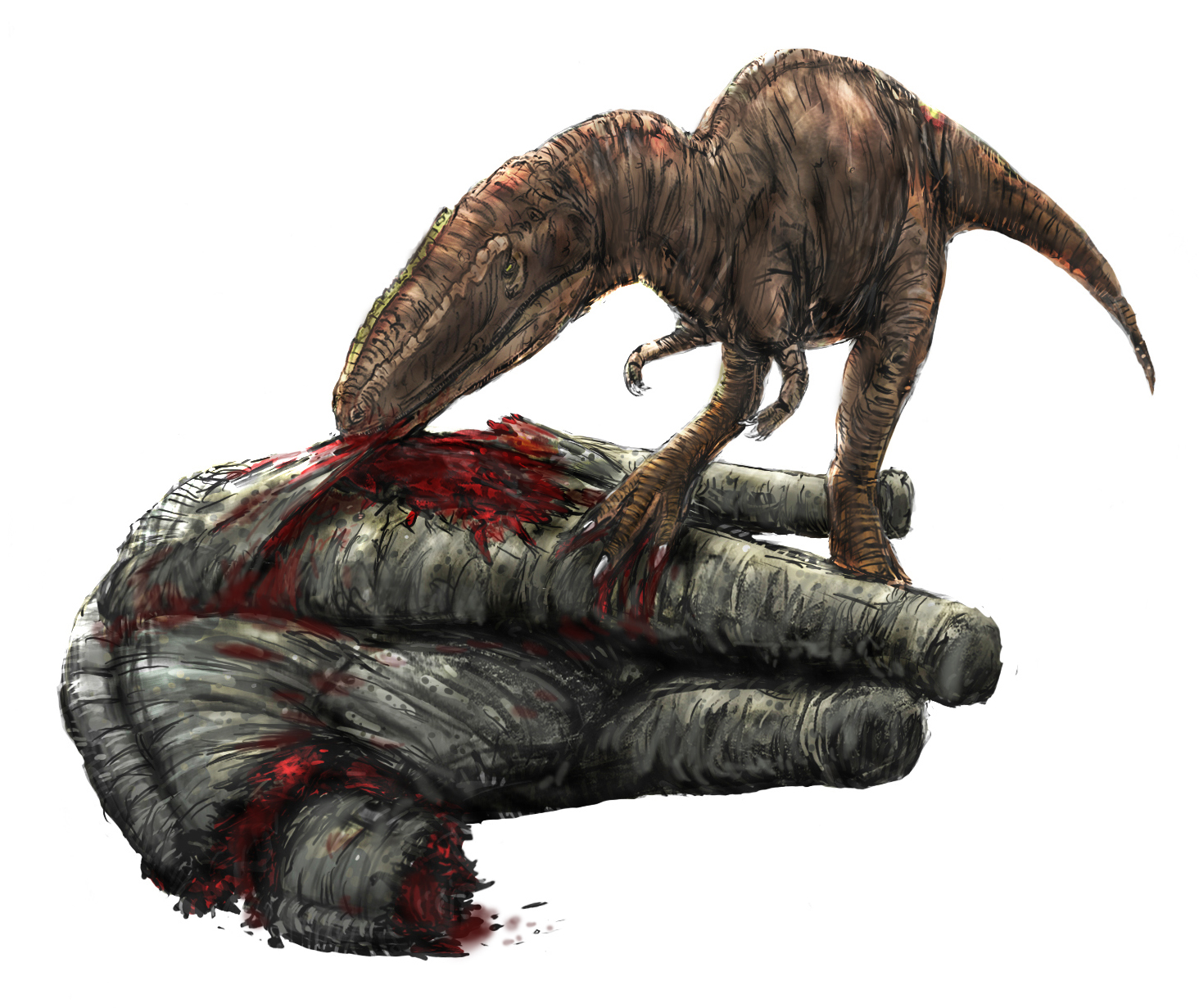
Reconstruction of a Tyrannotitan feeding on a Chubutisaurus

Tyrannotitan chubutensis lived during the Albian stage of the Early Cretaceous period, approximately 113 to 100 million years ago, in what is now the Cerro Castaño Member of the Cerro Barcino Formation in Chubut Province, Argentina. This region was part of Gondwana and featured a variety of environments, including river systems, floodplains, and semi-arid areas interspersed with scattered forests. The warm climate and abundant water sources, such as rivers and lakes, supported a diverse ecosystem that included large herbivorous dinosaurs, smaller theropods, and other fauna.

As an apex predator, Tyrannotitan likely played a significant role in shaping its ecosystem. Its diet primarily consisted of large herbivorous dinosaurs such as Chubutisaurus and possibly juveniles or weaker individuals of massive sauropods like Patagotitan. These interactions highlight its position at the top of the food chain. Evidence suggests that Tyrannotitan may have been an active hunter, using its powerful bite and robust dentition to subdue prey, though it may also have scavenged opportunistically.

Some studies propose that Tyrannotitan may have exhibited adaptations for ambush hunting near water sources. Its proximity to rivers and swamps not only provided cooling opportunities but also facilitated access to prey seeking refuge near these habitats. The possibility of social behavior remains speculative; however, tracksite evidence from other large theropods in Gondwana suggests that some degree of interaction or grouping behavior might have occurred.
