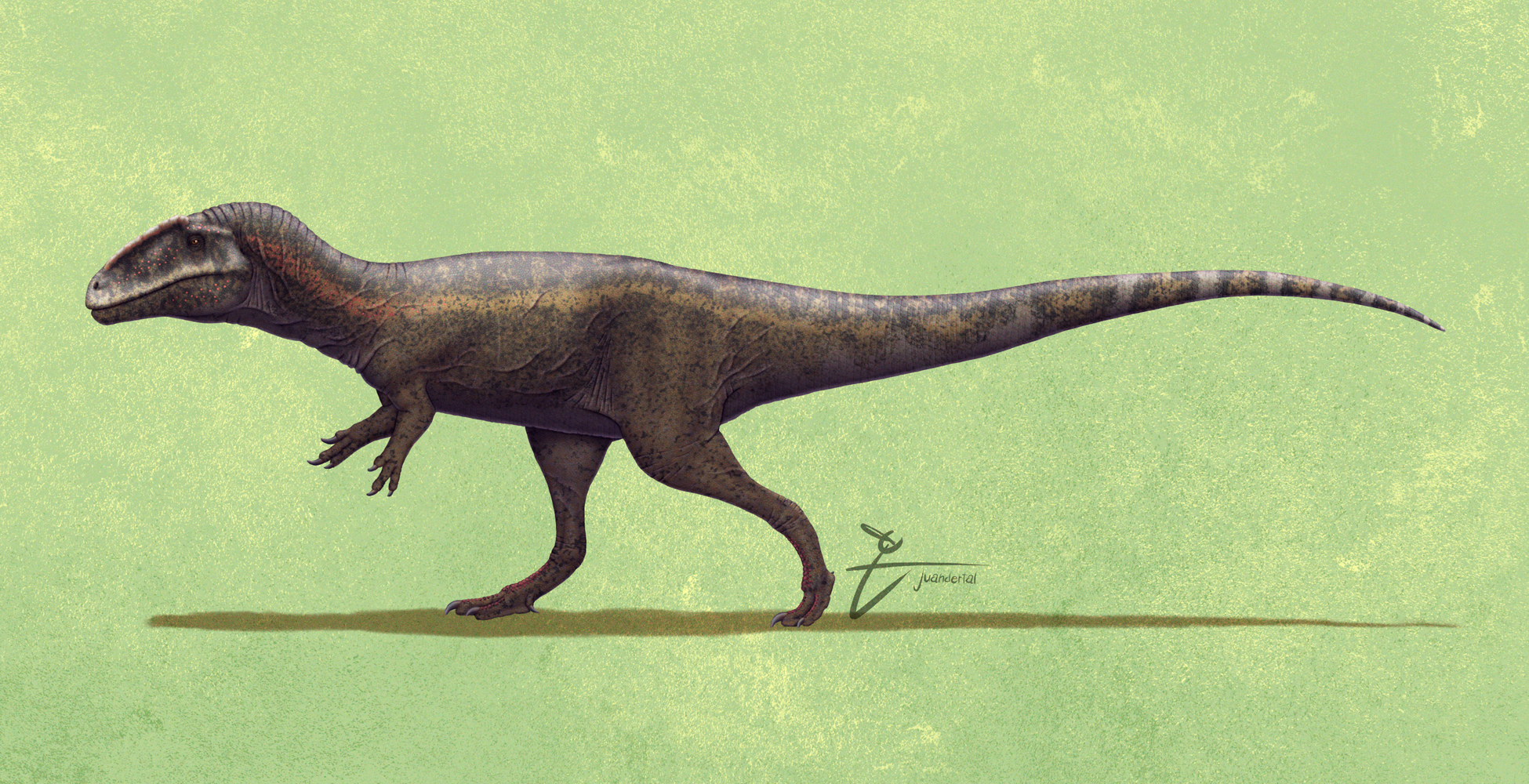
- Speculative life restoration

Scientific classification
- Kingdom: Animalia
- Phylum: Chordata
- Class: Reptilia
- Clade: Dinosauria
- Clade: Saurischia
- Clade: Theropoda
- Family: †Carcharodontosauridae
- Genus: †Lajasvenator; Coria et al., 2020

Type species
- †Lajasvenator ascheriae Coria et al., 2020

= Lajasvenator =

Lajasvenator Temporal range: Valanginian

Genus of carcharodontosaurid (fossil)

Lajasvenator (meaning "Las Lajas hunter" after the city of Las Lajas in Neuquén, Argentina) is a genus of carcharodontosaurid dinosaur from the Mulichinco Formation from Neuquén Province in Argentina. The type and only species is Lajasvenator ascheriae. It was probably one of the smaller known Carcharodontosaurids, being slightly more than half the length of Concavenator, about 3.5 m (11 ft).

Lajasvenator is known from two specimens, MLL-PV-005 (the holotype) and MLL-PV-007 (a referred specimen). The referred specimen includes the proximal end of a cervical rib that is identical to the seventh cervical rib of the holotype. It is possible that the early evolutionary stage for the Carcharodontosauridae started with medium-sized predators like Lajasvenator that later diversified into the heavily-built taxa such as Giganotosaurus and Mapusaurus. Lajasvenator is the oldest carcharodontosaur known from the Cretaceous of South America and is a key taxon for understanding the clade's evolutionary history.

== Classification ==
In their 2020 description of Lajasvenator, Coria et al. found it to be a carcharodontosaurid in a clade with Eocarcharia and Concavenator. In their description of Meraxes, Canale et al. (2022) recovered similar relationships, with Lajasvenator in a polytomy with Lusovenator, Eocarcharia, and Concavenator.

- Carcharodontosauridae
  - Neovenator
  - - Concavenator
    - Eocarcharia
    - Lajasvenator
    - Lusovenator
    - - Acrocanthosaurus
      - - Shaochilong
        - Carcharodontosaurinae
          - Carcharodontosaurus spp.
          - Giganotosaurini
            - Meraxes
            - - Tyrannotitan
              - - Giganotosaurus
                - Mapusaurus

In his 2024 review of theropod relationships, Andrea Cau recovered Lajasvenator as a carcharodontosaurid as the sister taxon to the clade formed by Labocania and Shaochilong.

- Carcharodontosauridae
  - Neovenator
  - - - Sauroniops
      - Veterupristisaurus
      - Lusovenator
      - Eocarcharia (type skull roof)
      - Concavenator
    - - Carcharodontosaurus iguidensis (holotype maxilla)
      - - Acrocanthosaurus
        - - Eocarcharia (referred maxilla)
          - - - - Meraxes
                - Carcharodontosaurus iguidensis (referred cranial material)
              - - Lajasvenator
                - - Labocania
                  - Shaochilong
            - - - Carcharodontosaurus saharicus (neotype)
                - Carcharodontosaurus saharicus (described by Stromer in 1931)
              - - Tyrannotitan
                - - Mapusaurus
                  - Giganotosaurus
