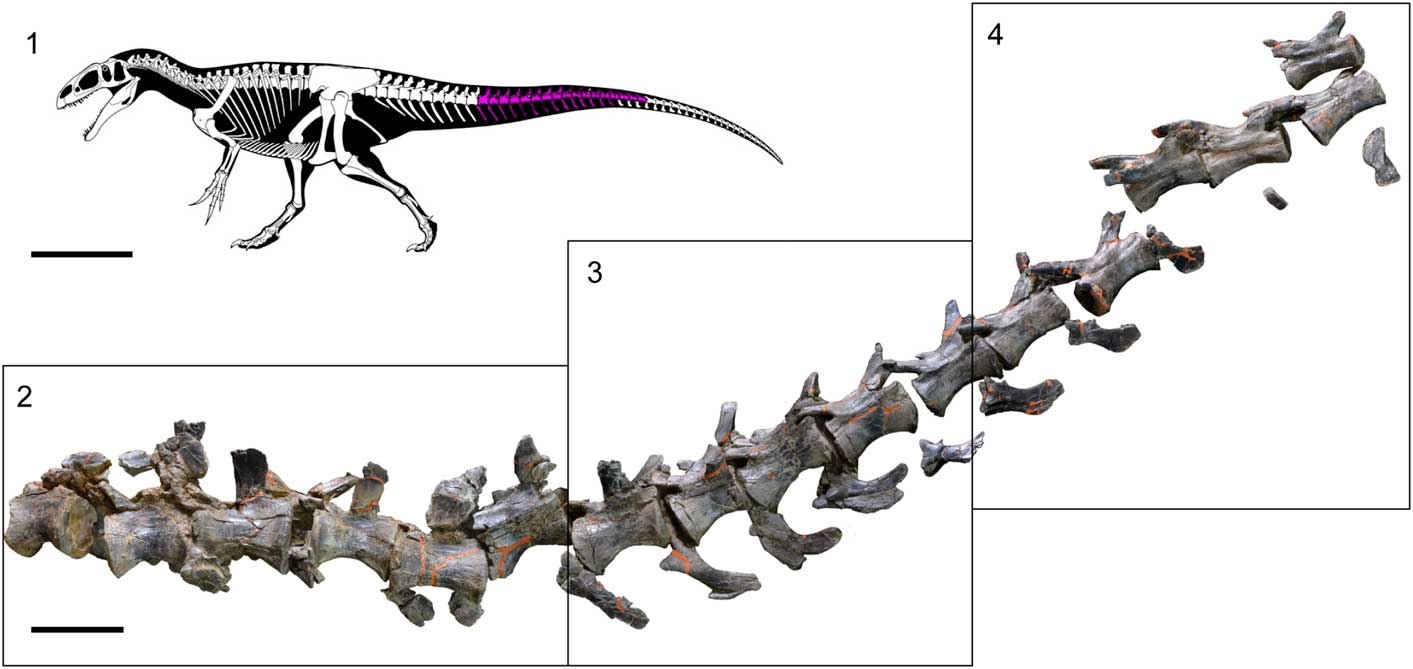
- Articulated caudal vertebrae referred to Lusovenator

Scientific classification
- Kingdom: Animalia
- Phylum: Chordata
- Class: Reptilia
- Clade: Dinosauria
- Clade: Saurischia
- Clade: Theropoda
- Clade: †Carcharodontosauria
- Genus: †Lusovenator; Malafaia et al., 2020

Type species
- †Lusovenator santosi Malafaia et al., 2020

= Lusovenator =

Lusovenator Temporal range: Late Jurassic (late Kimmeridgian)–(late Tithonian)

Extinct genus of dinosaurs

Lusovenator (meaning "Portuguese hunter") is a genus of carcharodontosaurian theropod dinosaur from the Late Jurassic (Kimmeridgian) Praia de Amoreira Porto-Novo Member and the Late Jurassic-Early Cretaceous (Tithonian-Berriasian) Assenta Member of the Lourinhã Formation in present-day Portugal. It includes one species, Lusovenator santosi.

== Discovery and naming ==
The holotype was discovered during the 1980s by José Joaquim dos Santos, and he donated his fossil collection to the Sociedade de História Natural around thirty years later. The unnamed holotype was described and placed in the Allosauroidea in 2017. The neotype, was described in 2019 and both specimens were placed within Carcharodontosauria. The species Lusovenator santosi was named and described in 2020.

The known remains consist of the holotype SHN.036 - "a partial postcranial skeleton preserving the odontoid, the atlantal intercentrum, a cervical vertebra, isolated cervical neural spines, dorsal vertebrae, fragments of sacral vertebrae, caudal vertebrae, chevrons, fragments of cervical and dorsal ribs, the right ilium, both pubes, and ischia", thought to represent a juvenile individual - and the referred specimen SHN.019, "a partial skeleton represented by a series of articulated caudal vertebrae and an almost complete right pes".

== Etymology ==
The generic name Lusovenator is derived from Lusitania, the province of the Roman Empire that roughly matches present-day Portugal, affixed with the Latin venator, meaning "hunter". The specific epithet, santosi, refers to José Joaquim dos Santos, who discovered the remains.

== Classification ==
The describers ran a phylogenetic analysis and recovered Lusovenator within the clade Carcharodontosauria, outside Carcharodontosauridae and Neovenatoridae. Their cladogram is shown below:

- Allosauroidea
  - Metriacanthosauridae
  - Allosauria
    - Allosauridae
    - Carcharodontosauria
      - Lusovenator
      - Veterupristisaurus
      - Siats
      - - Carcharodontosauridae
        - Neovenatoridae

Cau (2024) found Lusovenator to be in the family Carcharodontosauridae, forming a clade with Sauroniops, Veterupristisaurus, Eocarcharia, and Concavenator.

- Carcharodontosauridae
  - Neovenator
  - - - Sauroniops
      - Veterupristisaurus
      - Lusovenator
      - Eocarcharia (type skull roof)
      - Concavenator
    - - Carcharodontosaurus iguidensis (holotype maxilla)
      - - Acrocanthosaurus
        - - Eocarcharia (referred maxilla)
          - - - - Meraxes
                - Carcharodontosaurus iguidensis (referred cranial material)
              - - Lajasvenator
                - - Labocania
                  - Shaochilong
            - - - Carcharodontosaurus saharicus (neotype)
                - Carcharodontosaurus saharicus (described by Stromer in 1931)
              - - Tyrannotitan
                - - Mapusaurus
                  - Giganotosaurus
