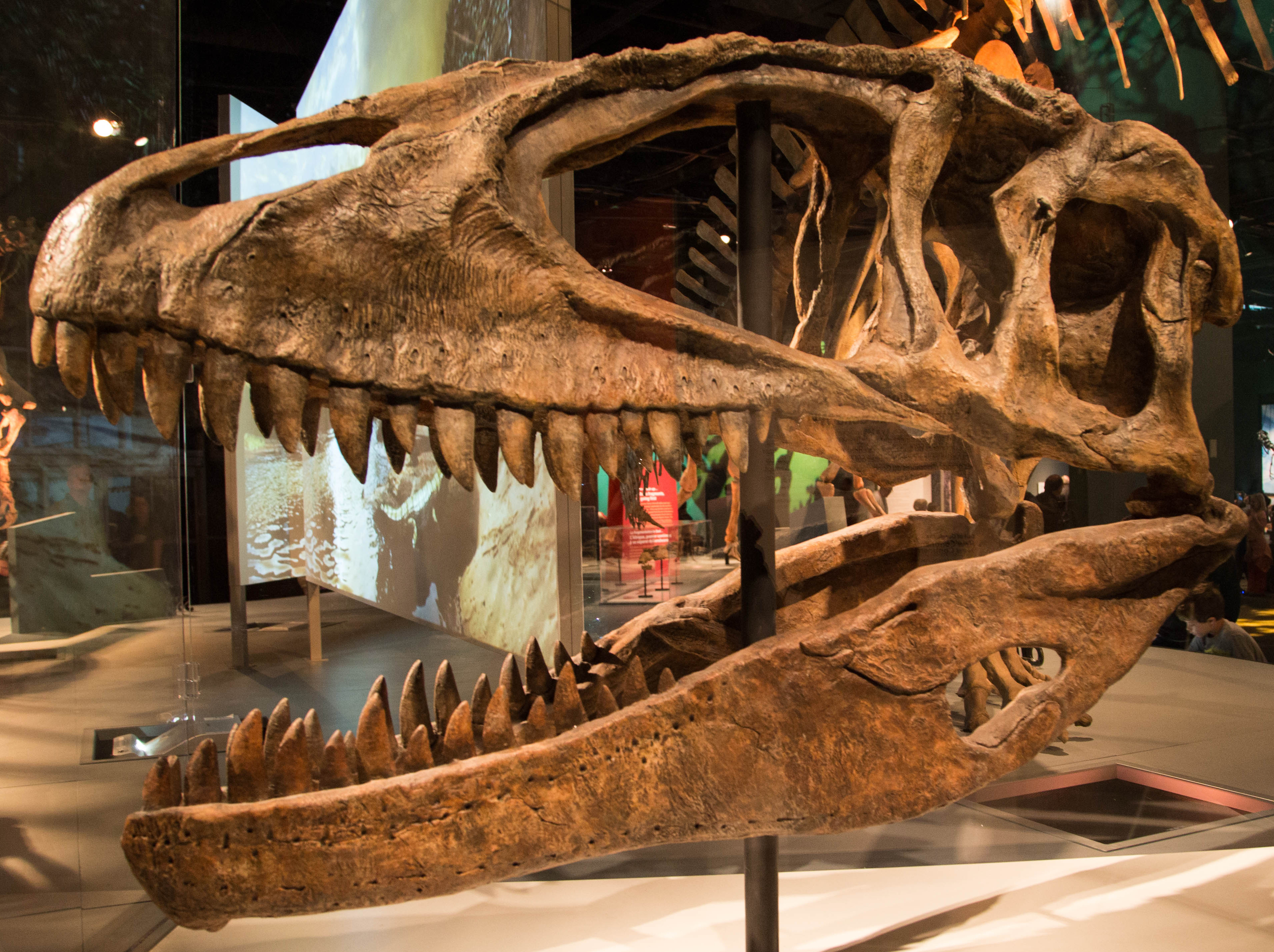
- Reconstructed Carcharodontosaurus skull, Science Museum of Minnesota
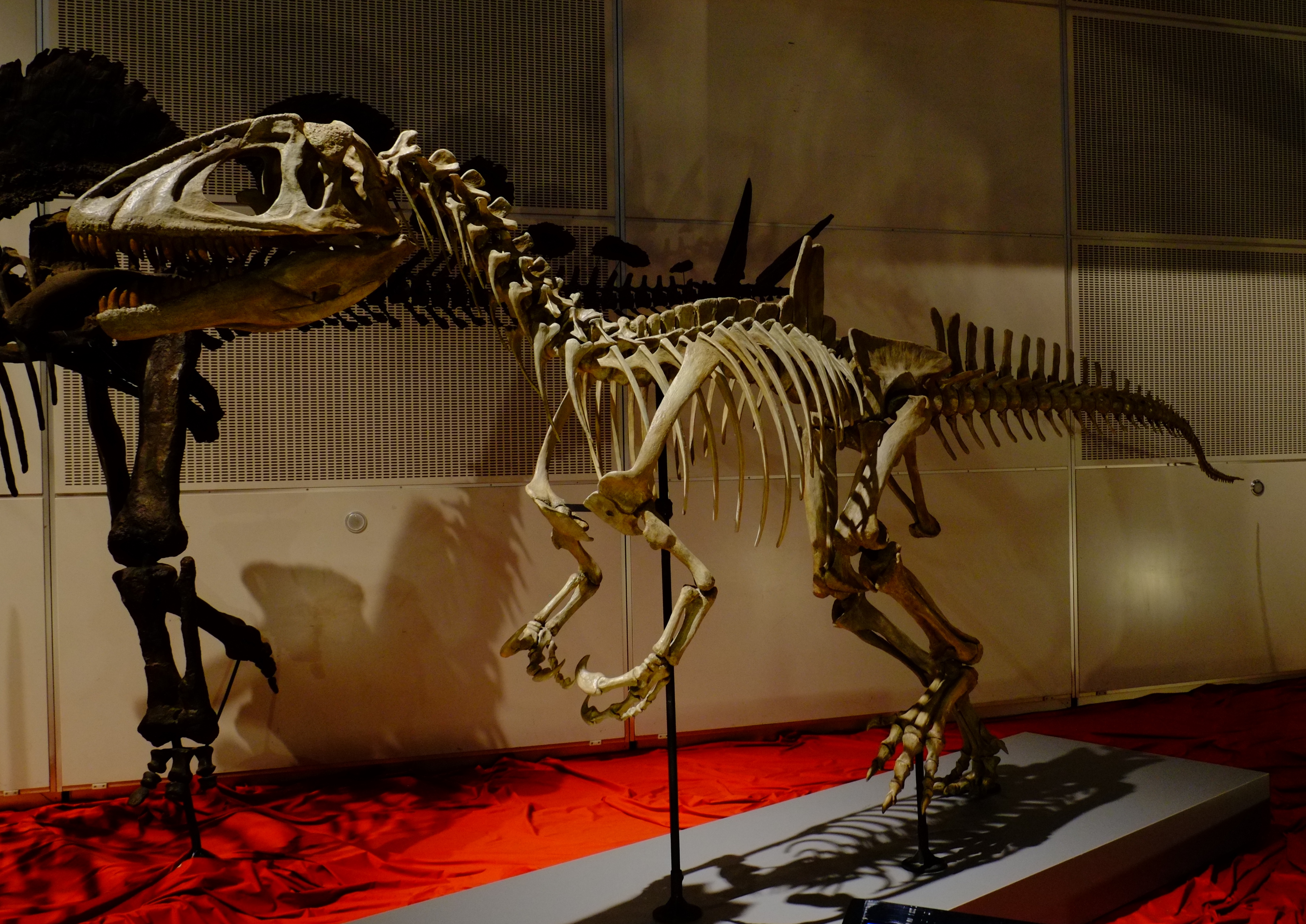
- Reconstructed skeleton of Concavenator on display in Japan

Scientific classification
- Kingdom: Animalia
- Phylum: Chordata
- Class: Reptilia
- Clade: Dinosauria
- Clade: Saurischia
- Clade: Theropoda
- Clade: †Carcharodontosauria
- Family: †Carcharodontosauridae; Stromer, 1931

Subgroups
- †Acrocanthosaurus
- †Concavenator
- †Lajasvenator
- †Sauroniops
- †Tameryraptor
- †Ulughbegsaurus
- †Veterupristisaurus
- †Carcharodontosaurinae Brusatte & Sereno, 2007
  - †Carcharodontosaurus
  - †Giganotosaurini Brusatte & Sereno, 2008
    - †Giganotosaurus
    - †Mapusaurus
    - †Meraxes
    - †Taurovenator
    - †Tyrannotitan
Possible members
- †Datanglong
- †Eocarcharia
- †Kelmayisaurus
- †Lusovenator
- †Neovenator
- †Poekilopleuron
- †Shaochilong
- †Siamraptor
- †Wakinosaurus

Synonyms
- Acrocanthosauridae Molnar, 2003

= Carcharodontosauridae =

Carcharodontosaurids Temporal range: Late Jurassic - early Late Cretaceous 154–90 Ma

Extinct family of dinosaurs

Carcharodontosauridae (carcharodontosaurids; from the Greek καρχαροδοντόσαυρος, carcharodontósauros: "shark-toothed lizards") is a group of carnivorous theropod dinosaurs. In 1931, Ernst Stromer named Carcharodontosauridae as a family, which, in modern paleontology, indicates a clade within Carnosauria. Carcharodontosaurids include some of the largest land predators ever known: Acrocanthosaurus, Giganotosaurus, Mapusaurus, Carcharodontosaurus, and Tyrannotitan all rivaled Tyrannosaurus and Spinosaurus in size. Estimates give a maximum weight of 8–10 metric tons (8.8–11.0 short tons) for the largest carcharodontosaurids, while the smallest carcharodontosaurids were estimated to have weighed at least 500 kilograms (1,100 lb).

== Discovery and history ==
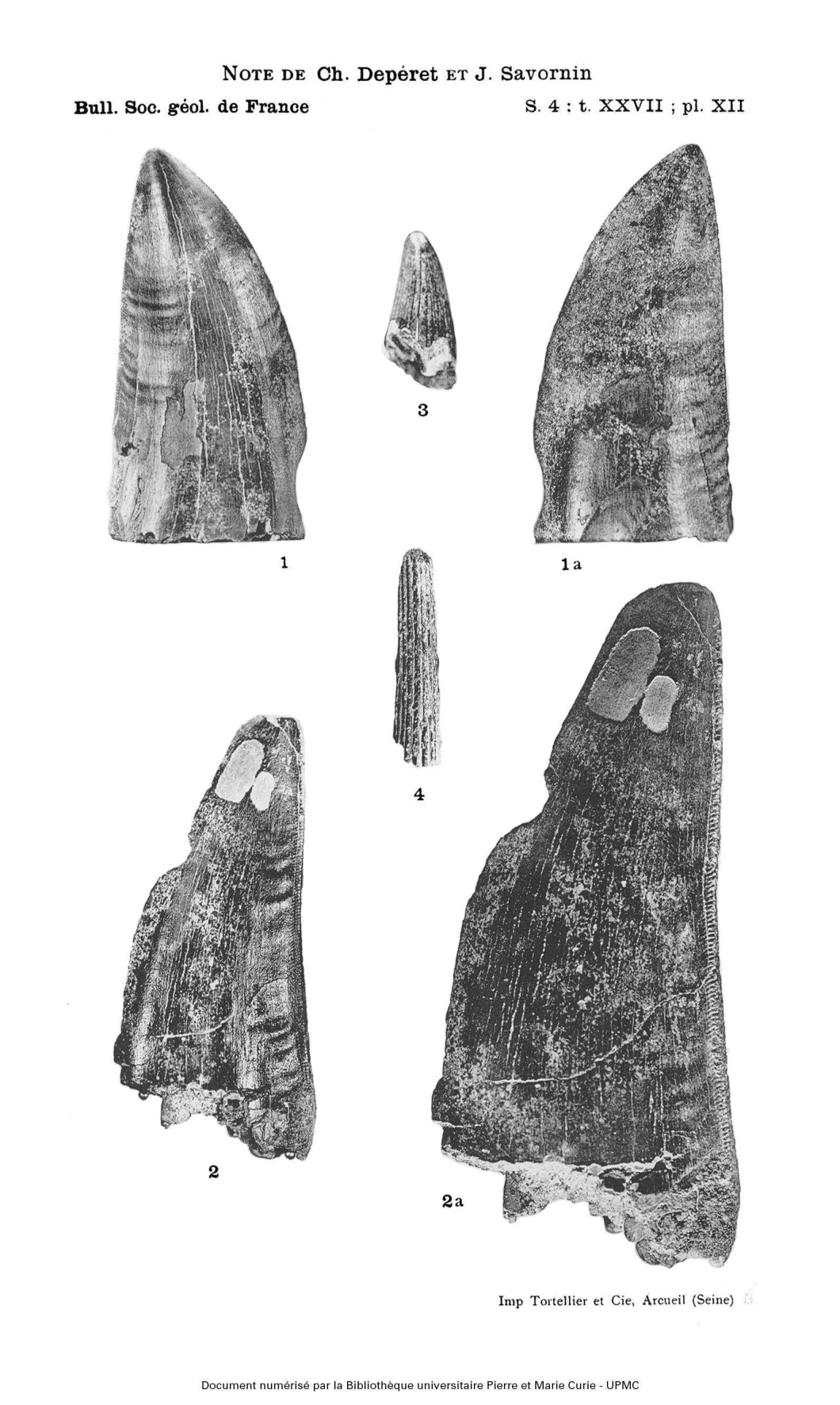
Lost original teeth of Carcharodontosaurus (Megalosaurus) saharicus (Fig. 1-2), the lectotype being at the top (Fig. 1)

The earliest discovery of carcharodontosaurid fossils may date to 1835 with the discovery of Poekilopleuron in Jurassic-aged sediments in Normandy, France and it was then described in 1836 by French naturalist Jacques Amand Eudes-Deslongchamps. However, the holotype (name-bearing) specimen, which consisted of an incomplete postcranial skeleton, was destroyed during World War II. Due to the fragmentary and destroyed nature of Poekilopleuron's fossils, little can be ascertained about its phylogenetic position or validity. However, recent phylogenetic analyses have recovered it as a basal carcharodontosaurid or carcharodontosaurian, though it has also been classified as a metriacanthosaurid, megalosauroid, or another position in Carnosauria. If not Poekilopleuron, the oldest discovery of carcharodontosaurid fossils would be between 1909 and 1913 with the discovery of Veterupristisaurus in the Jurassic-aged Tendaguru Formation of Lindi, Tanzania. These fossils, consisting of several caudal (tail) vertebrae, were described by German paleontologist Werner Janensch in 1925 as belonging to an indeterminate large theropod. However after further study in 2011, German paleontologist Oliver Rauhut concluded that these vertebrae belonged to a novel genus and species of carcharodontosaurid which he named Veterupristisaurus milneri.

Fossils of Carcharodontosaurus itself were discovered in 1924 in several Cretaceous-aged deposits of the Continental Intercalaire in Timimoun, Algeria. These fossils, consisting of only two teeth, were then described by French geologists Charles Depéret and Justin Savornin in 1925 as belonging to a new species of theropod dinosaur, Megalosaurus saharicus, though then Megalosaurus was a wastebasket taxon. It was the first theropod described from North Africa and the first confirmed carcharodontosaurid to be named. Both teeth have since been lost and are now thought to be undiagnostic, however many other teeth and bones were referred to the species from Cretaceous-aged sediments across North Africa. A partial skeleton of a carcharodontosaurid was unearthed in marls near Ain Gedid, Egypt in 1914 by Austro-Hungarian paleontologist Richard Markgraf and deposited in the collections of the Paläontologisches Museum München in 1922. This incomplete skeleton was described by German paleontologist Ernst Stromer in 1931, who recognized the uniqueness of the teeth and skeleton leading to him to erect a new genus name for M. saharicus, Carcharodontosaurus. This name was for their similarities, in sharpness and serrations, to the teeth of the great white shark (Carcharodon carcharias). Carcharodontosaurus is the name-bearing genus of the family Carcharodontosauridae, whose name means "shark-toothed lizards". In describing this partial skeleton, Stromer designated the smaller of the two teeth described by Deperet and Savornin as the type specimen of C. saharicus. Thus, this tooth, although lost, must be considered as the lectotype (a later selected type specimen) of this species. However, this partial skeleton was later destroyed in World War II and was recognized as a new genus and species of carcharodontosaurid, Tameryraptor markgrafi, in 2025.

=== Later discoveries ===
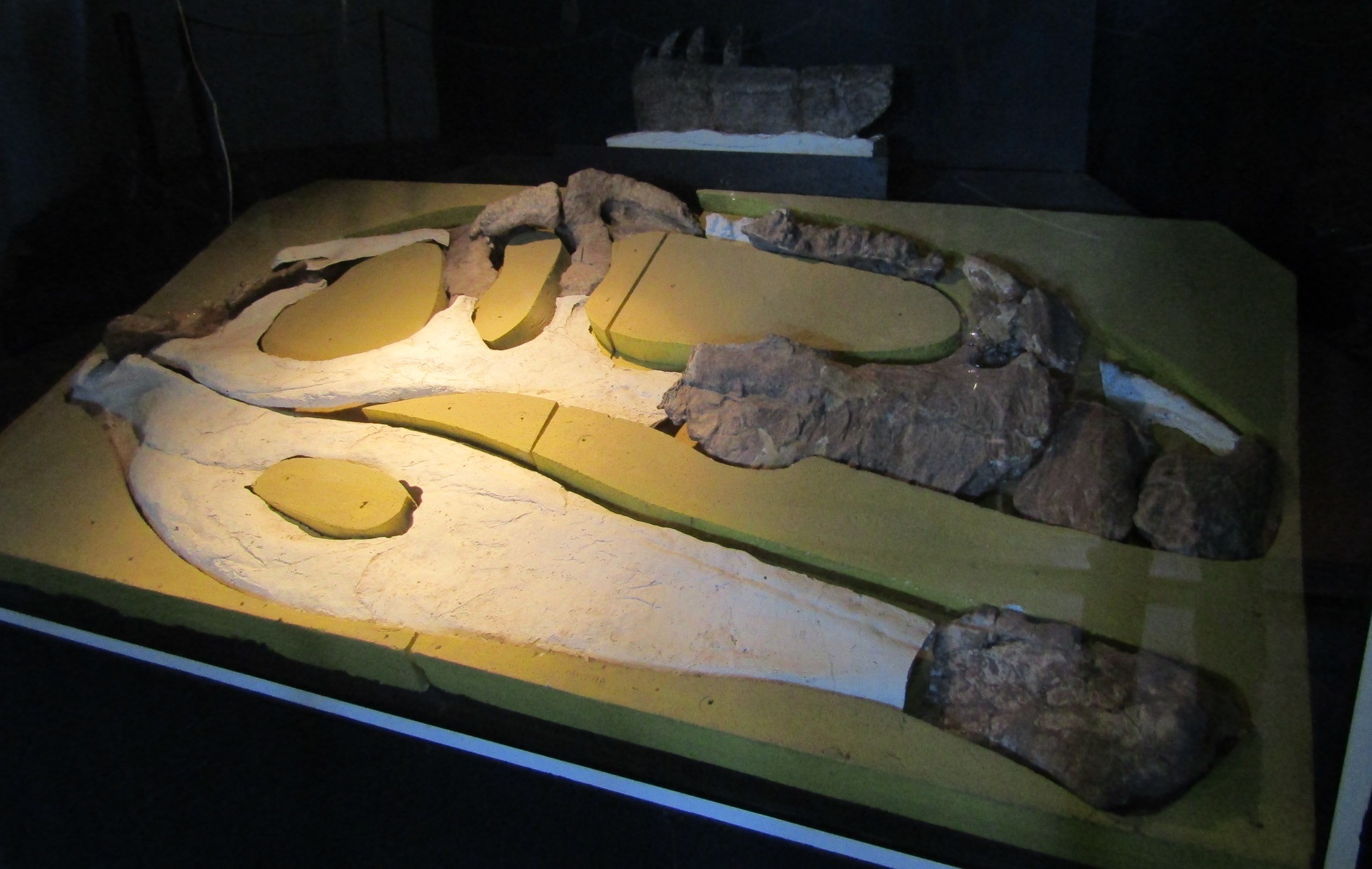
Partial holotype skull (white parts are reconstructed) and teeth of Giganotosaurus, Ernesto Bachmann Paleontological Museum

Following the description of Carcharodontosaurus, few additional carcharodontosaurid discoveries were made or recognized as being carcharodontosaurid. Fossils of carcharodontosaurids, such as those of Acrocanthosaurus, were often described as belonging to another family in Carnosauria or Theropoda, or described as species of other genera, such as Shaochilong. However, in the 1990s and 2000s, resurgent interest in the Cretaceous fauna of Gondwana led to the discovery of many additional carcharodontosaurids. Although isolated carcharodontosaurid fossils had been known from South America since the 1960s with the description of "Megalosaurus chubutensis", the first major find came with the discovery of Giganotosaurus in 1993. Giganotosaurus was found in Cretaceous-aged rocks in Neuquén, Argentina and named in 1995 by Argentine paleontologists Rodolfo Coria and Leonardo Salgado. This specimen of Giganotosaurus consisted of around 70% of the skeleton, including much of the vertebral column, skull, and limbs. However, Coria and Salgado did not recognize the close relationship of Giganotosaurus to Carcharodontosaurus and Acrocanthosaurus.

Also in 1995, an incomplete skull of Carcharodontosaurus was unearthed from layers of the Lower Douira Formation, Kem Kem Beds, in Errachidia, southeastern Morocco. This skull was then described by American paleontologist Paul Sereno and colleagues in 1996, who recognized that Giganotosaurus and Acrocanthosaurus were both members of Carcharodontosauridae, together forming a transcontinental clade. Since the 1990s, a menagerie of novel genera have been described. This includes taxa represented by relatively complete and well-preserved remains, such as Concavenator, Meraxes, and Tyrannotitan. In 2007, American paleontologists Steve Brusatte and Sereno erected a subfamily, Carcharodontosaurinae, for Carcharodontosaurus, Giganotosaurus, Mapusaurus, and Tyrannotitan, to encompass the highly-derived, giant carcharodontosaurids of Africa and South America. It was defined as the least inclusive clade encompassing Carcharodontosaurus and Giganotosaurus. Within Carcharodontosaurinae is the tribe Giganotosaurini, which consists of South American carcharodontosaurines but excludes Carcharodontosaurus.

== Evolution ==
Along with the spinosaurids, carcharodontosaurids were the largest predators in the early and middle Cretaceous throughout Gondwana, with species also present in North America (Acrocanthosaurus), Europe (Concavenator) and possibly Asia (Shaochilong). Although not classified within the family Carcharodontosauridae, indeterminate remains of carcharodontosaurians are also found in Early Cretaceous deposits of Australia. Carcharodontosaurids range throughout the Cretaceous from the Barremian (127-121 million years ago) to the Turonian (94-90 million years ago). Past the Turonian, they were replaced by the smaller abelisaurids in Gondwana and by tyrannosaurids in North America and Asia. While some teeth and a maxilla discovered in Maastrichtian deposits of Brazil. this identification has been subsequently rejected and the material assigned to abelisaurids after better examination, and there are no reliable records of carcharodontosaurs in South America beyond the end of the Turonian. In December 2011, Oliver W. M. Rauhut described a new genus and species of carcharodontosaurid from the Late Jurassic (late Kimmeridgian to earliest Tithonian faunal stage, about 154-150 million years ago) of Tendaguru Formation, southeastern Tanzania. This genus, Veterupristisaurus represents the oldest known carcharodontosaurid.

Size comparison of seven carcharodontosaurids, though the inclusion of Shaochilong as a member of the family is under contention.

== Classification ==
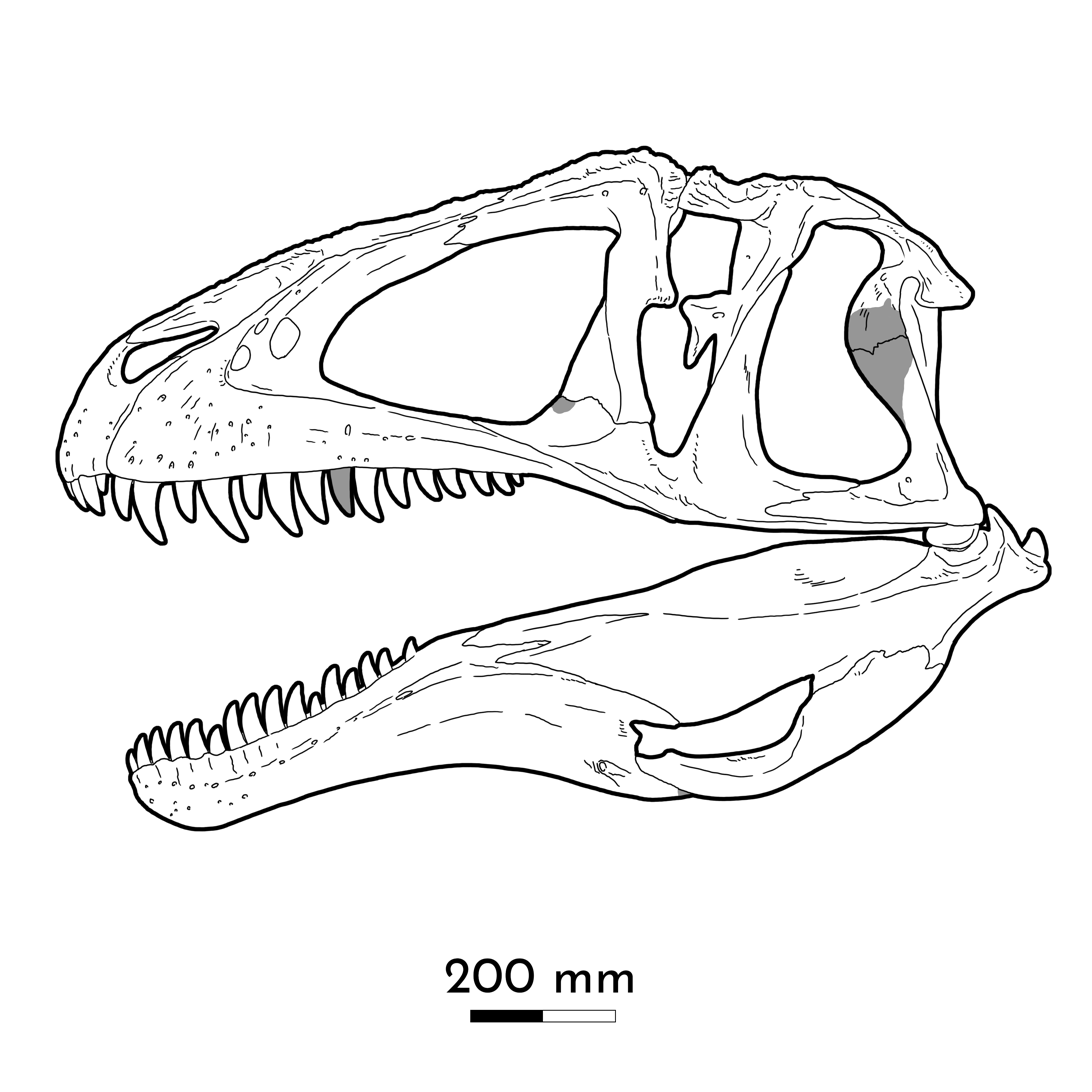
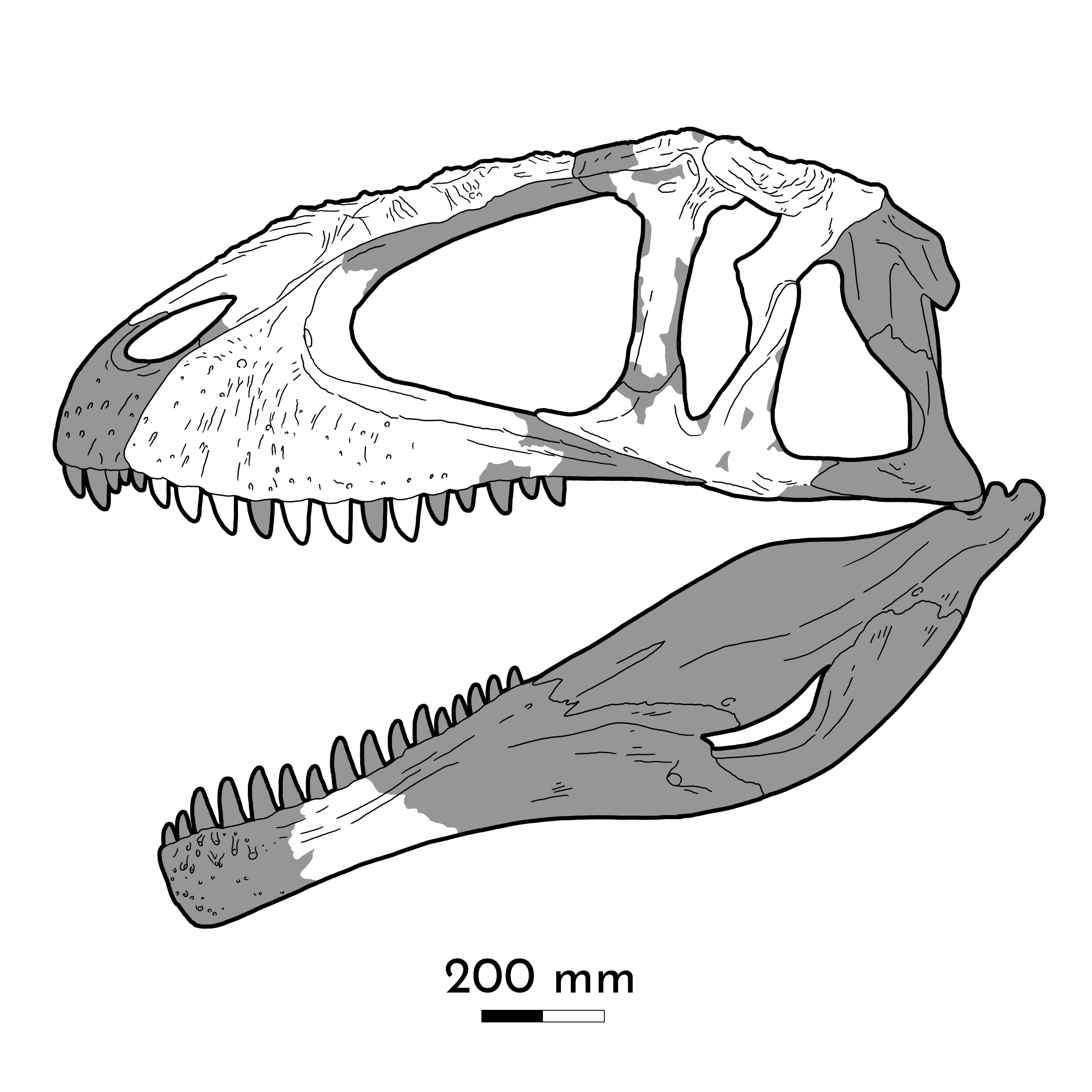
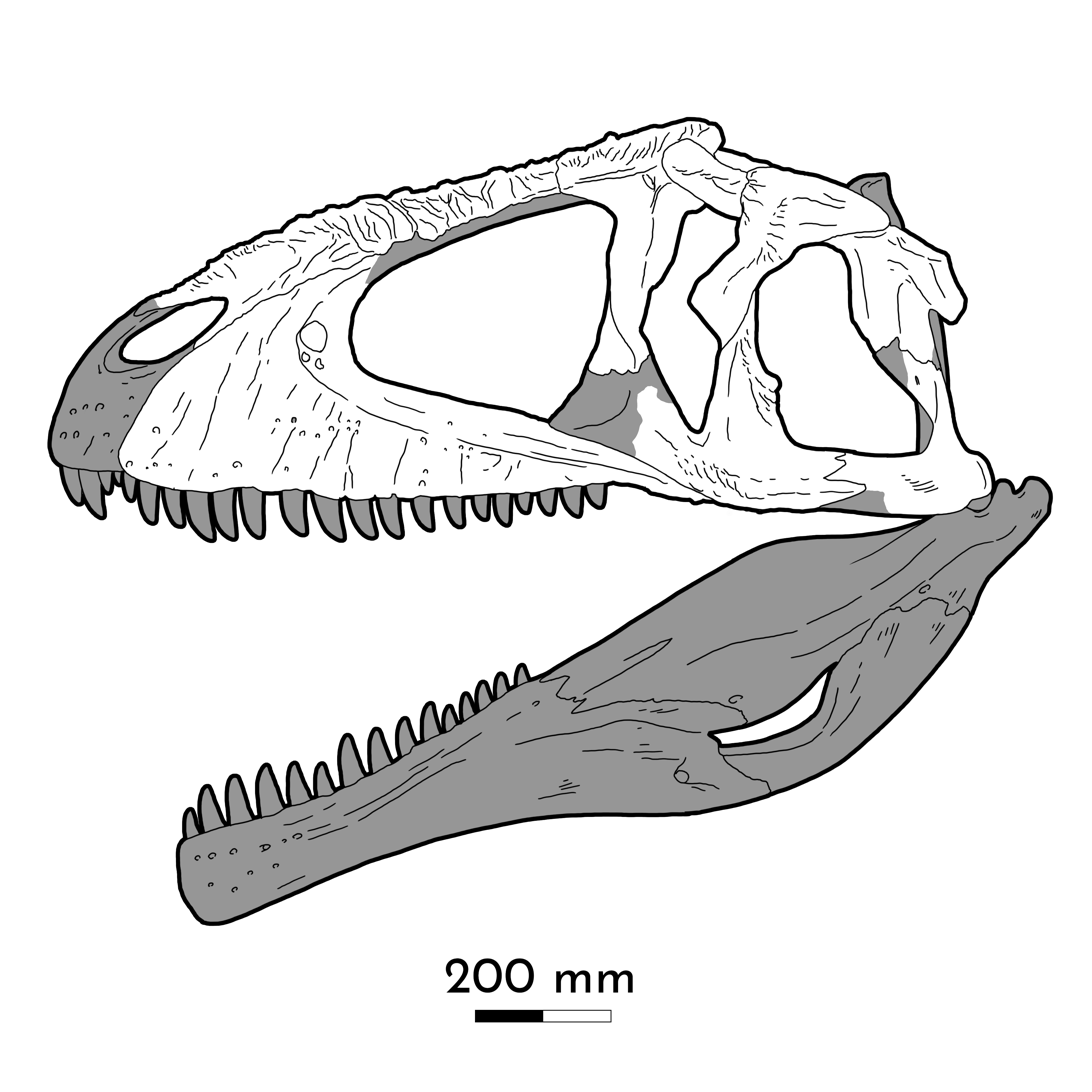
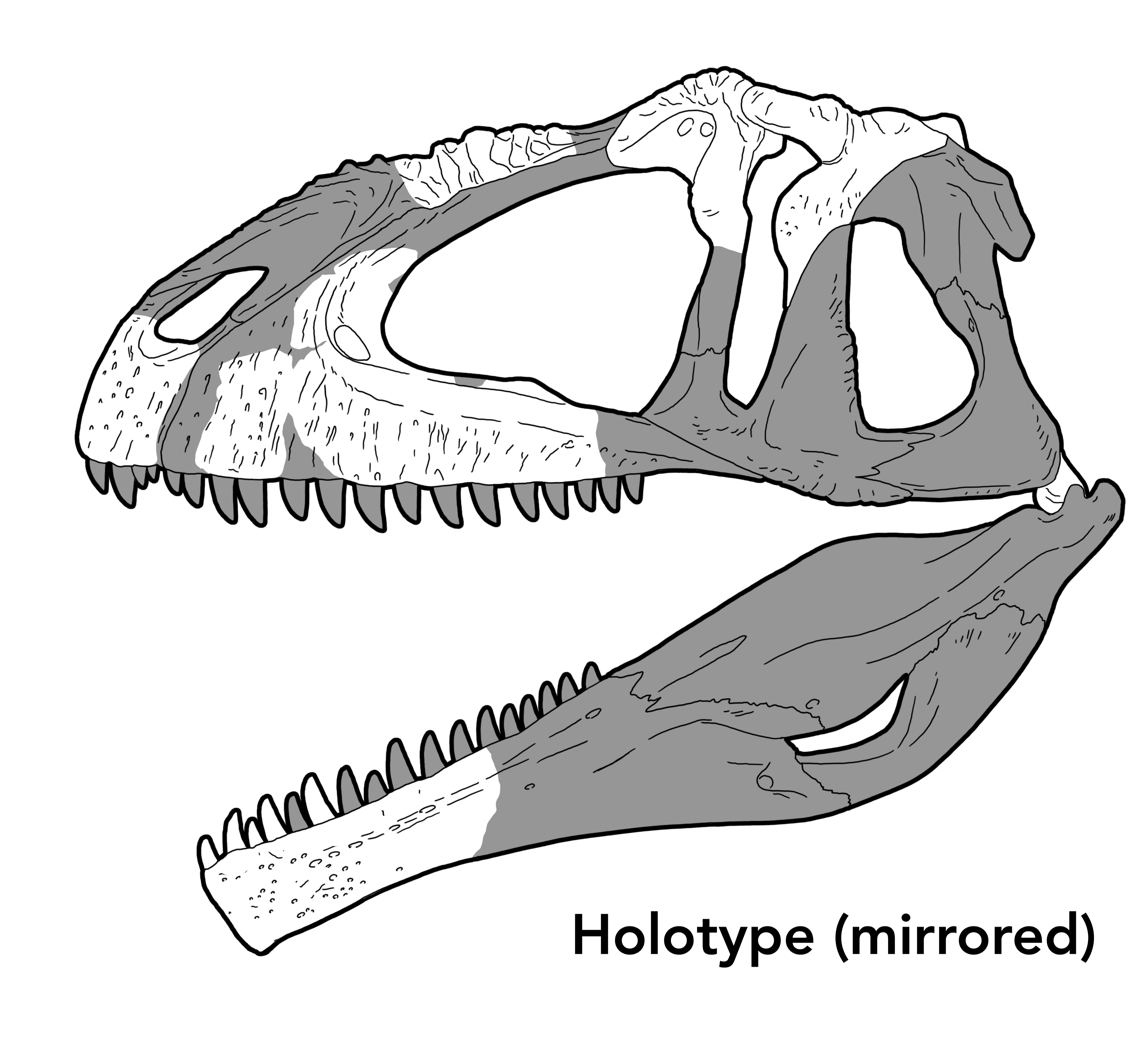
Top to bottom: Acrocanthosaurus, Carcharodontosaurus, Meraxes, Giganotosaurus

The family Carcharodontosauridae was originally named by Ernst Stromer in 1931 to include the single newly discovered species Carcharodontosaurus saharicus. A close relative of C. saharicus, Giganotosaurus, was added to the family when it was described in 1995. Additionally, many paleontologists have included Acrocanthosaurus in this family (Sereno et al. 1996, Harris 1998, Holtz 2000, Rauhut 2003, Eddy & Clarke, 2011, Rauhut 2011), though others place it in the related family Allosauridae (Currie & Carpenter, 2000; Coria & Currie, 2002). Carcharodontosaurids are characterized by the following morphological characteristics : Dorsoventral depth of anterior maxillary interdental plates more than twice anteroposterior width, squared, sub-rectangular anterior portion of the dentary, teeth with wrinkled enamel surfaces, presence of four premaxillary alveoli and a premaxillary body taller than long in lateral aspect, opisthocoelous cervical vertebrae with neural spines more than 1.9 times the height of the centrum, large, textured rugosities on the lacrimal and postorbital formed by roofing and forming broad orbital shelves, and a proximomedially inclined femoral head. With the discovery of Mapusaurus in 2006, Rodolfo Coria and Phil Currie erected a subfamily of Carcharodontosauridae, the Giganotosaurinae, to contain the most advanced South American species, which they found to be more closely related to each other than to the African and European forms. Coria and Currie did not formally refer Tyrannotitan to this subfamily, pending a more detailed description of that genus, but noted that based on characteristics of the femur, it may be a giganotosaurine as well.

Restoration of the crushed skull of Concavenator

In 1998 Paul Sereno defined Carcharodontosauridae as a clade, consisting of Carcharodontosaurus and all species closer to it than to either Allosaurus, Sinraptor, Monolophosaurus, or Cryolophosaurus. Therefore, this clade is by definition outside of the clade Allosauridae.

The cladogram below follows the analyses by Canale et al. (2022) from their description of the large carcharodontosaurine Meraxes.

- Carcharodontosauridae
  - Neovenator
  - - Concavenator
    - Eocarcharia
    - Lajasvenator
    - Lusovenator
    - - Acrocanthosaurus
      - - Shaochilong
        - Carcharodontosaurinae
          - Carcharodontosaurus spp.
          - Giganotosaurini
            - Meraxes
            - - Tyrannotitan
              - - Giganotosaurus
                - Mapusaurus

In his 2024 review of theropod relationships, Cau recovered the following results for the Carcharodontosauridae.

- Carcharodontosauridae
  - Neovenator
  - - - Sauroniops
      - Veterupristisaurus
      - Lusovenator
      - Eocarcharia (type skull roof)
      - Concavenator
    - - Carcharodontosaurus iguidensis (holotype maxilla)
      - - Acrocanthosaurus
        - - Eocarcharia (referred maxilla)
          - - - - Meraxes
                - Carcharodontosaurus iguidensis (referred cranial material)
              - - Lajasvenator
                - - Labocania
                  - Shaochilong
            - - - Carcharodontosaurus saharicus (neotype)
                - Carcharodontosaurus saharicus (described by Stromer in 1931)
              - - Tyrannotitan
                - - Mapusaurus
                  - Giganotosaurus

While describing Tameryraptor in their phylogenetic analyses Kellermann, Cuesta & Rauhut (2025) recovered the following results. They recovered Lusovenator and Veterupristisaurus as Late Jurassic carcharodontosaurids. Taurovenator and Kelmayisaurus were recovered variably within or outside Carcharodontosauridae. Siamraptor and Concavenator were recovered as sister taxa outside of Carcharodontosauridae but still basal members of Carcharodontosauria in all analyses. Datanglong was consistently recovered as an indeterminate carcharodontosaurid along with Veterupristisaurus. Neovenator, Eocarcharia, and Poekilopleuron were recovered outside of Carcharodontosauridae in all analyses, with Neovenator consistently recovered within Carcharodontosauria and sometimes as the sister taxon of Chilantaisaurus. Shaochilong was recovered as a tyrannosauroid rather than a carcharodontosaurid.

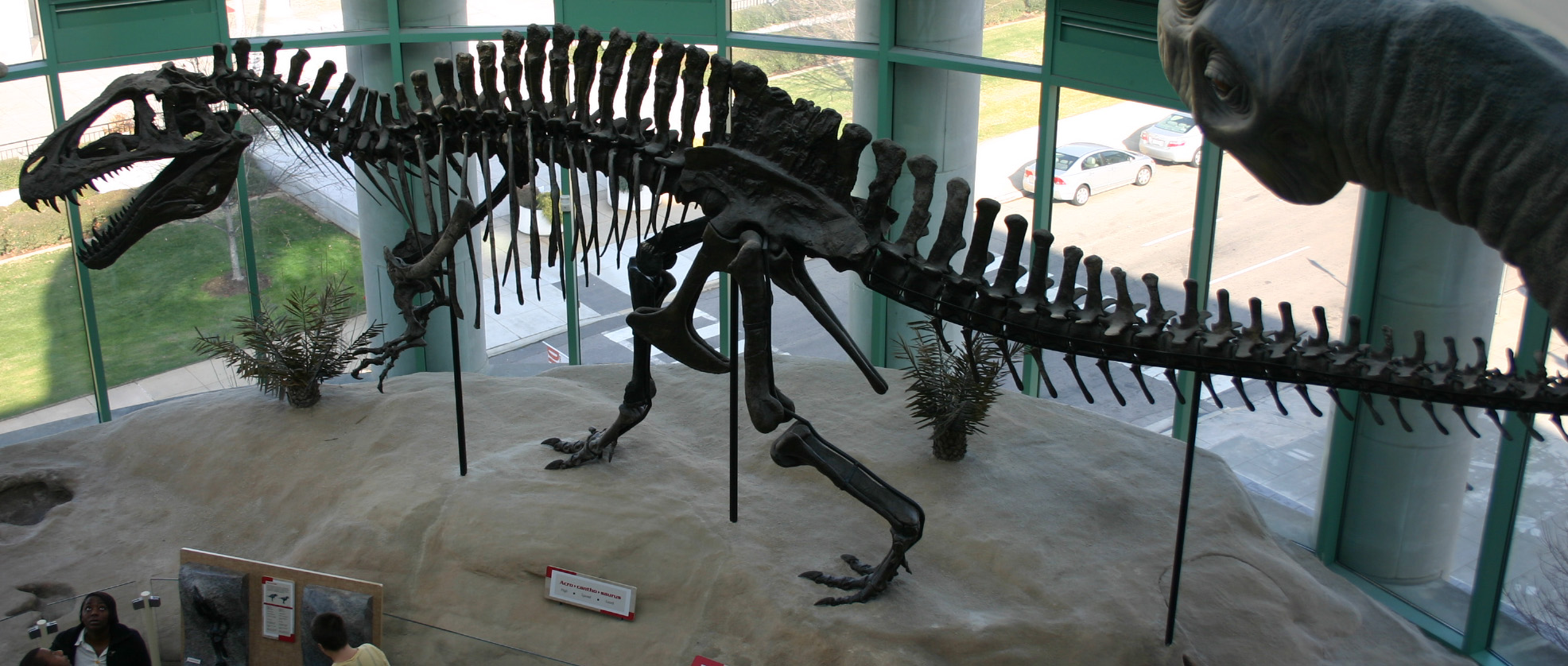
Mounted Acrocanthosaurus skeleton (NCSM 14345) at the North Carolina Museum of Natural Sciences.

- Carcharodontosauridae
  - - Lusovenator
    - Lajasvenator
  - - Acrocanthosaurus
    - - Tameryraptor
      - - Carcharodontosaurus iguidensis
        - Carcharodontosaurinae
          - - Taurovenator
            - Carcharodontosaurus saharicus
          - Giganotosaurini
            - Meraxes
            - - Tyrannotitan
              - - Mapusaurus
                - Giganotosaurus

== Paleobiology ==
=== Growth ===
Osteohistological analysis of the Meraxes holotype specimen suggests the individual could have been between 39 and 53 years old when it died, having reached skeletal maturity approximately 4 years prior to its death (between 35 and 49 years old), making it the longest-lived non-avian theropod currently known. Meraxes was determined to have grown to large size by extending its growth period (hypermorphosis), rather than increasing its relative growth rate (acceleration) through development as in Tyrannosaurus, to which it was compared.
