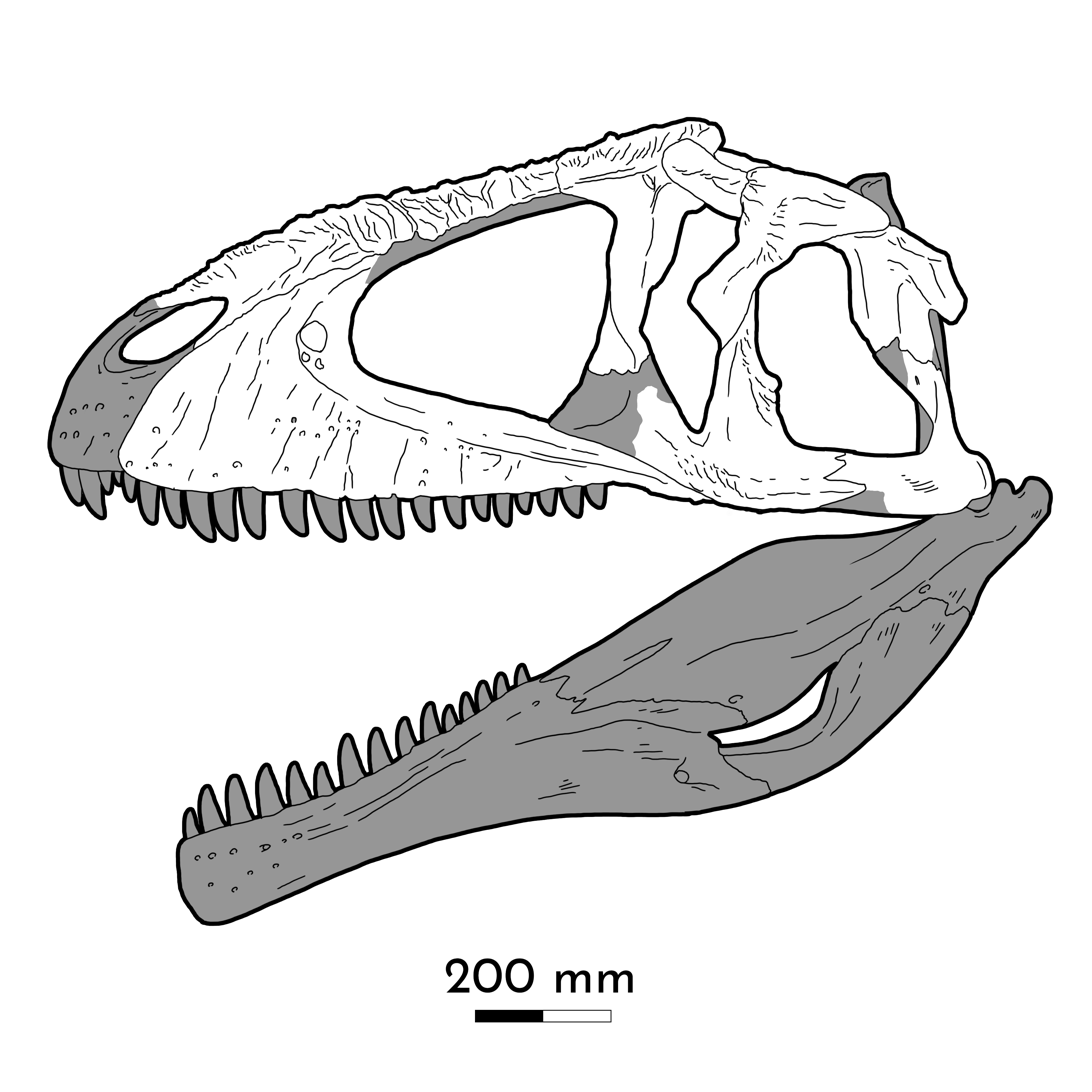
- Reconstructed skull

Scientific classification
- Kingdom: Animalia
- Phylum: Chordata
- Class: Reptilia
- Clade: Dinosauria
- Clade: Saurischia
- Clade: Theropoda
- Family: †Carcharodontosauridae
- Tribe: †Giganotosaurini
- Genus: †Meraxes; Canale et al., 2022
- Species: †M. gigas

Binomial name
- †Meraxes gigas Canale et al., 2022

= Meraxes =

Meraxes Temporal range: Early Cretaceous (Albian), 106.2 Ma

Genus of carcharodontosaurid dinosaurs

Meraxes is a genus of large carcharodontosaurid theropod dinosaur from the Early Cretaceous Huincul Formation of Patagonia, Argentina. The genus contains a single species, Meraxes gigas.

== Discovery and naming ==
The holotype of Meraxes, MMCh-PV 65, was discovered in 2012. Known from a nearly complete skull, pectoral and pelvic elements, partial forelimbs, complete hindlimbs, fragmentary ribs and cervical and dorsal vertebrae, a sacrum, and several complete caudal vertebrae, it represents the most complete carcharodontosaurid skeleton known from the Southern Hemisphere. The specimen was referred to as the "Campanas carcharodontosaurid" before its description as a new species in 2022.

Meraxes gigas was described in 2022 by Canale et al. based on these remains. The generic name, "Meraxes", honors a female dragon ridden by Queen Rhaenys Targaryen in the George R. R. Martin novel series, A Song of Ice and Fire. The specific name, "gigas", means "giant" in Greek, in reference to its large size.

== Description ==
Size of the holotype compared to a human

The holotype of Meraxes was estimated to weigh approximately 4.26 metric tons (4.70 short tons). Henderson (2023) listed a body length estimate of 9–10 metres (30–33 ft), referencing Canale et al. (2022), but also estimated a body length of 10.2–11.6 metres (33–38 ft) using the pelvic area. Its skull is 1.27 m (4.2 ft) long, similar to that of Acrocanthosaurus, which has a skull length of 1.23–1.29 m (4.0–4.2 ft). A second specimen is estimated to be 15% larger than the holotype,although this should be treated with caution as it has only been published in an abstract.

The shapes and proportions of various bones, including the skull, scapula, metacarpals, ischial shaft, and foot, indicate that Meraxes and Acrocanthosaurus had similar proportions and body size. Meraxes possessed reduced forelimbs, an instance of convergent evolution that occurred independently in four different lineages: Carcharodontosauridae, Abelisauridae, Tyrannosauridae, and Alvarezsauridae. Additionally, the second toes possess an enlarged claw, almost twice as long as the claw on the fourth toe.

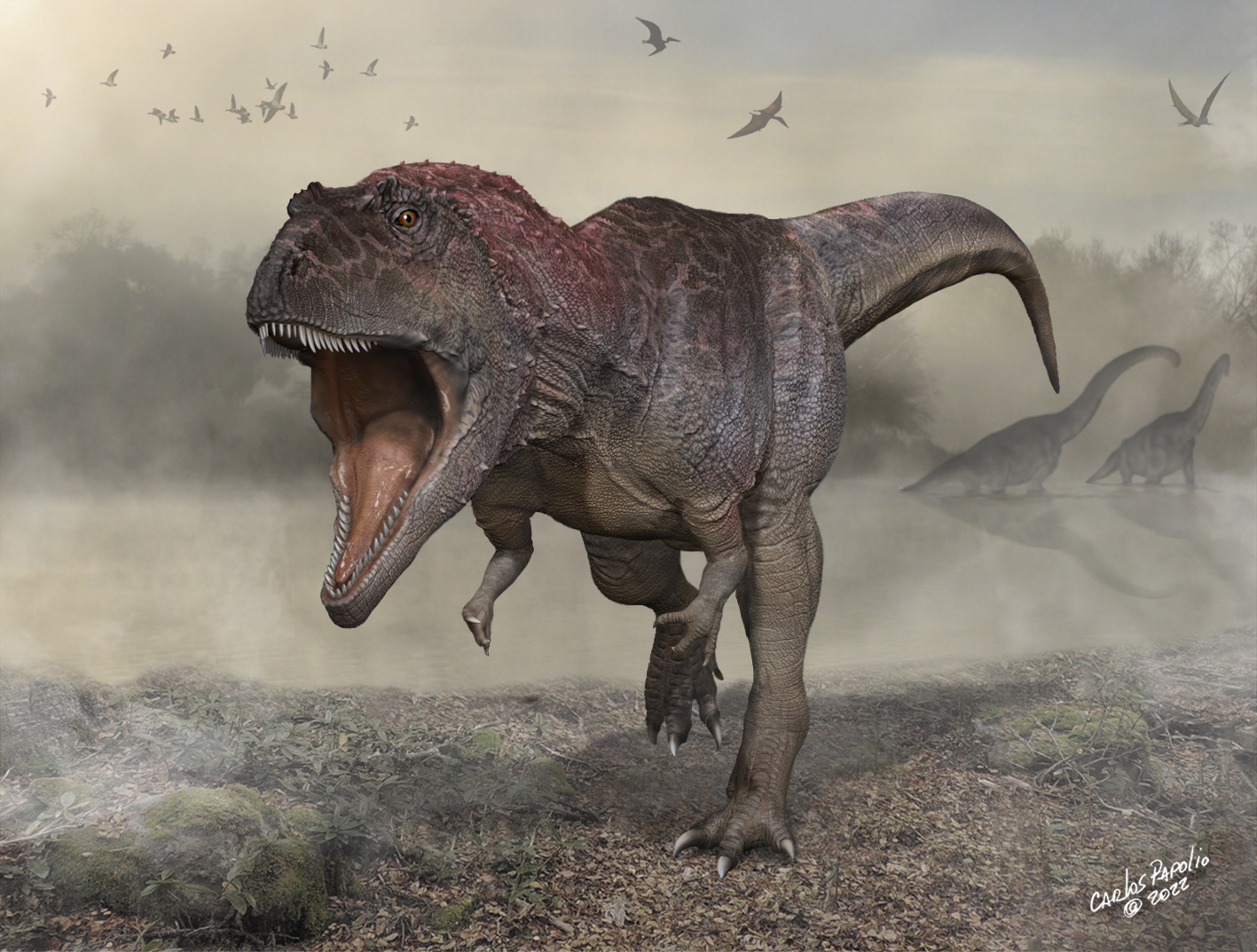
Life restoration

== Paleobiology ==
Osteohistological analysis of the holotype suggests the individual could have been between 39 and 53 years old when it died, having reached skeletal maturity approximately 4 years prior to its death (between 35 and 49 years old). This would make it among the longest-lived non-avian theropods currently known. Meraxes was determined to have grown to a large size by extending its growth period (hypermorphosis), rather than increasing its relative growth rate (acceleration) through development as in Tyrannosaurus, to which it was compared. A 2026 study indicated that Tyrannosaurus likely underwent a more gradual and protracted growth rate than previously thought, reaching asymptomatic size at around 35–40 years of age. The upper limit of the growth rate of Tyrannosaurus is approximately 43–53 years. This would suggest convergent similarities in growth rates between the two giant theropods.

== Classification ==
Canale et al. (2022) recovered Meraxes as the earliest diverging member of the tribe Giganotosaurini within the Carcharodontosauridae. The results of their phylogenetic analyses are displayed in the cladogram below:

- Carcharodontosauridae
  - Neovenator
  - - Concavenator
    - Eocarcharia
    - Lajasvenator
    - Lusovenator
    - - Acrocanthosaurus
      - - Shaochilong
        - Carcharodontosaurinae
          - Carcharodontosaurus spp.
          - Giganotosaurini
            - Meraxes
            - - Tyrannotitan
              - - Giganotosaurus
                - Mapusaurus

== Paleoenvironment ==
Several dinosaurs from the Huincul Formation (Meraxes in dark blue, left)

The fossil remains of Meraxes were recovered from the Huincul Formation. A substantial number of taxa are known to have inhabited this paleoenvironment. Theropods from the formation include the paravian Overoraptor, the elaphrosaurine Huinculsaurus, the abelisaurs Skorpiovenator, Tralkasaurus, and Ilokelesia, the megaraptoran Aoniraptor, and the fellow giant carcharodontosaurids Mapusaurus and Taurovenator. Meraxes was found in an older rock layer than either Mapusaurus and Taurovenator, so it is unlikely they coexisted. The herbivores of the area are represented by the rebbachisaurid sauropods Cathartesaura and Limaysaurus, the titanosaurs Argentinosaurus, Choconsaurus, and Chucarosaurus, and indeterminate iguanodonts.
