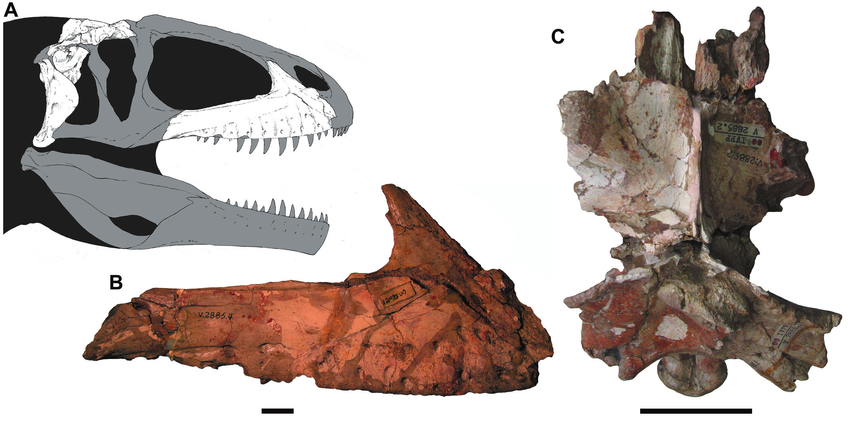
- Skull reconstruction and fossils of Shaochilong maortuensis

Scientific classification
- Kingdom: Animalia
- Phylum: Chordata
- Class: Reptilia
- Clade: Dinosauria
- Clade: Saurischia
- Clade: Theropoda
- Clade: †Carcharodontosauria
- Family: †Carcharodontosauridae (?)
- Genus: †Shaochilong; Brusatte et al., 2009
- Species: †S. maortuensis

Binomial name
- †Shaochilong maortuensis (Hu, 1964)

Synonyms
- "Alashansaurus" Chure, 2000 (nomen nudum)

= Shaochilong =

Shaochilong Temporal range: Early Cretaceous, ~Barremian–Albian

Extinct genus of dinosaurs

Shaochilong (meaning "shark toothed dragon") is an extinct genus of tetanuran theropod dinosaurs from the Early Cretaceous (Barremian to Albian stages) Miaogou Formation of China, though a more restrictive suggestion from the Aptian to the Albian has been suggested based on faunal composition. It was usually described as a carcharodontosaurid, but other phylogenies have suggested a different position as a tyrannosauroid or as a member of polytomic allosauroid. The genus contains a single species, Shaochilong maortuensis, which was originally placed in the genus Chilantaisaurus as C. maortuensis, but was re-described and reclassified in 2009.

== History ==
The material referred to Shaochilong, IVPP V.2885.1-7, was found in the Miaogou Formation (Maortu locality; originally interpreted as the nearby Ulansuhai Formation). It consists of skull fragments (a braincase, partial skull roof, quadrates, and a right maxilla), axis and six caudal vertebrae. A fragmentary left maxilla was also referred to the species, although it has apparently gone missing as of 2009. Although these are believed to belong to a single individual, a lectotype was established in 2010 to accommodate for the possibility that the specimens came from multiple individuals. The lectotype consists of the braincase (IVPP V.2885.1) and partial skull roof (IVPP V.2885.2). All of these specimens were discovered in Inner Mongolia and described by Hu in 1964 as a species of Chilantaisaurus. The genus was informally named "Alashansaurus" by Chure in 2000.

Chure (2002) and Rauhut (2001) suggested that it did not belong to that genus, and was probably a primitive coelurosaur. However, a re-description by Brusatte and colleagues in 2009 found that it was a carcharodontosaurid, the first recognized from Asia, though this has now been disputed. This re-description also provided a new genus name. A more comprehensive description and discussion was published the following year.

== Description ==
Size of Shaochilong reconstructed as a carcharodontosaurid compared to a human

The individual which IVPP V2885.1 belonged to was probably adult or nearly adult individual, due to the fusion of many elements of the braincase. Shaochilong's length – based on the length of the maxillary tooth row – is estimated at 5 to 6 metres (16 to 20 ft). Estimated length of the femur is 61.5 cm which suggests the whole animal weighed approximately 500 kilograms (1,100 lb). This made Shaochilong an uncharacteristically small for a carcharodontosaurid, in contrast with other members of the family, which were among the largest carnivorous animals on earth. According to the proportions of its maxilla, Shaochilong would have been relatively short-faced if a carcharodontosaur. In combination with its comparatively small size, it could have had a unique ecological role in comparison to other members of this family. The taxa seemed to provide an unambiguous example of a fairly large carnosaur in Cretaceous Asia at the time of its description, and was considered the youngest known Laurasian allosauroid. However, a 2024 study has interpreted it to come from the Miaogou formation instead of the Ulansuhai formation which would make the genus Barremian to Albian, and phylogenetic studies have cast doubt on its carcharodontosaurid nature.

== Classification ==
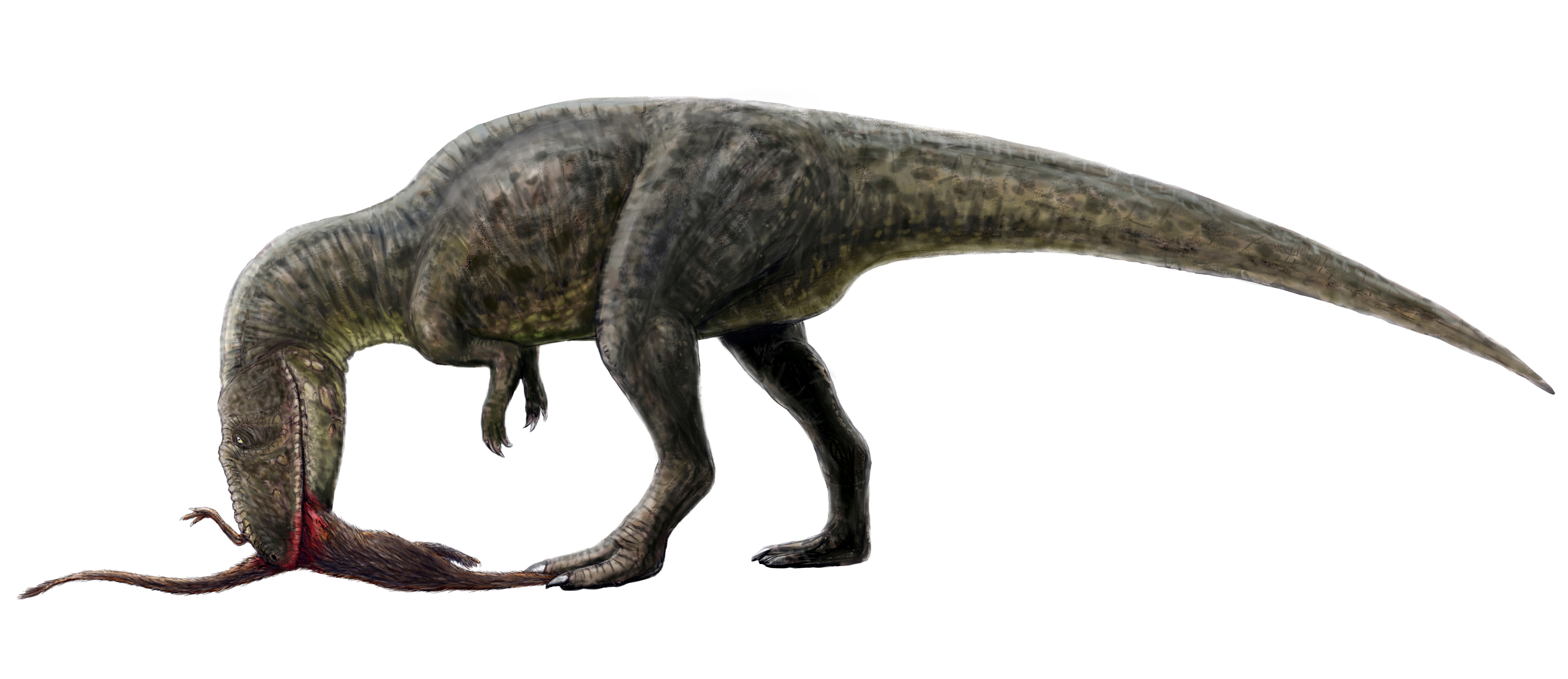
Restoration of Shaochilong as a carcharodontosaurid preying on an ornithomimid

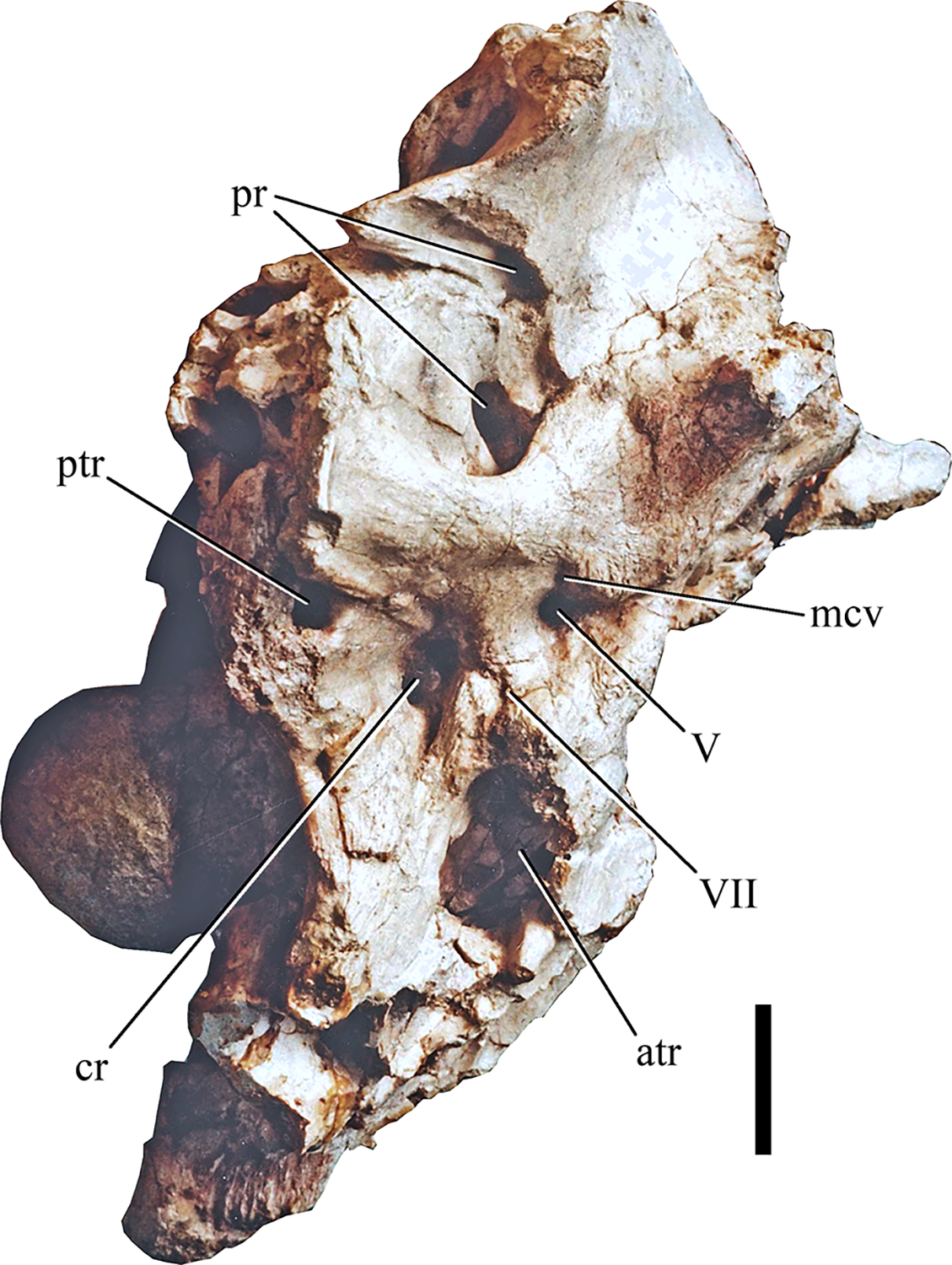
Braincase IVPP V 2885 in right lateral view

Phylogenetic analyses performed by Brusatte and coworkers indicate that Shaochilong is deeply nested within the carcharodontosaurids, the most derived group among the allosauroids. Shaochilong appears to be more closely related to the Gondwanan carcharodontosaurians (Tyrannotitan, Carcharodontosaurus, Mapusaurus, Giganotosaurus) than the Laurasian ones (such as Neovenator and Acrocanthosaurus). Shaochilong was distinguished from other carcharodontosaurids due to having the several autapomorphies, including a reduced and nearly absent maxillary antorbital fossa, no paradental groove on the medial surface of the maxilla, deep vertical grooves located dorsally on the maxillary interdental plates, a pneumatic recess which penetrates to the posterior end of the nasal, a deep sagittal crest on the frontal, and a large pneumatic foramen in the anterodorsal corner of the prootic's dorsal tympanic recess.

In their description of the large South American carcharodontosaurid Meraxes, Canale et al. (2022) recovered Shaochilong as the sister taxon to the Carcharodontosaurinae. The results of their phylogenetic analyses are displayed in the cladogram below:

- Carcharodontosauridae
  - Neovenator
  - - Concavenator
    - Eocarcharia
    - Lajasvenator
    - Lusovenator
    - - Acrocanthosaurus
      - - Shaochilong
        - Carcharodontosaurinae
          - Carcharodontosaurus spp.
          - Giganotosaurini
            - Meraxes
            - - Tyrannotitan
              - - Giganotosaurus
                - Mapusaurus

However, some more recent research has questioned this taxon's position as a carcharodontosaurid. In the description of the metriacanthosaurid Alpkarakush, Shaochilong was recovered as a member of Tyrannosauroidea in the phylogenetic analyses of tetanurans. Additionally, in the description of the large African carcharodontosaurid Tameryraptor, all analyses recovered Shaochilong as a tyrannosauroid as it shares several autapomorphies with the grouping, while many of its listed carcharodontosaurid autapomorphies are either present in other theropods or problematic in their definition. In the reappraisal of Camarillasaurus by Rauhut and colleagues, Shaochilong was placed again in the polytomic Allosauroidea, close to carcharodontosaurians. The describers of the metriacanthosaurid Yuanmouraptor have placed Shaochilong back to Carcharodontosauridae again.
