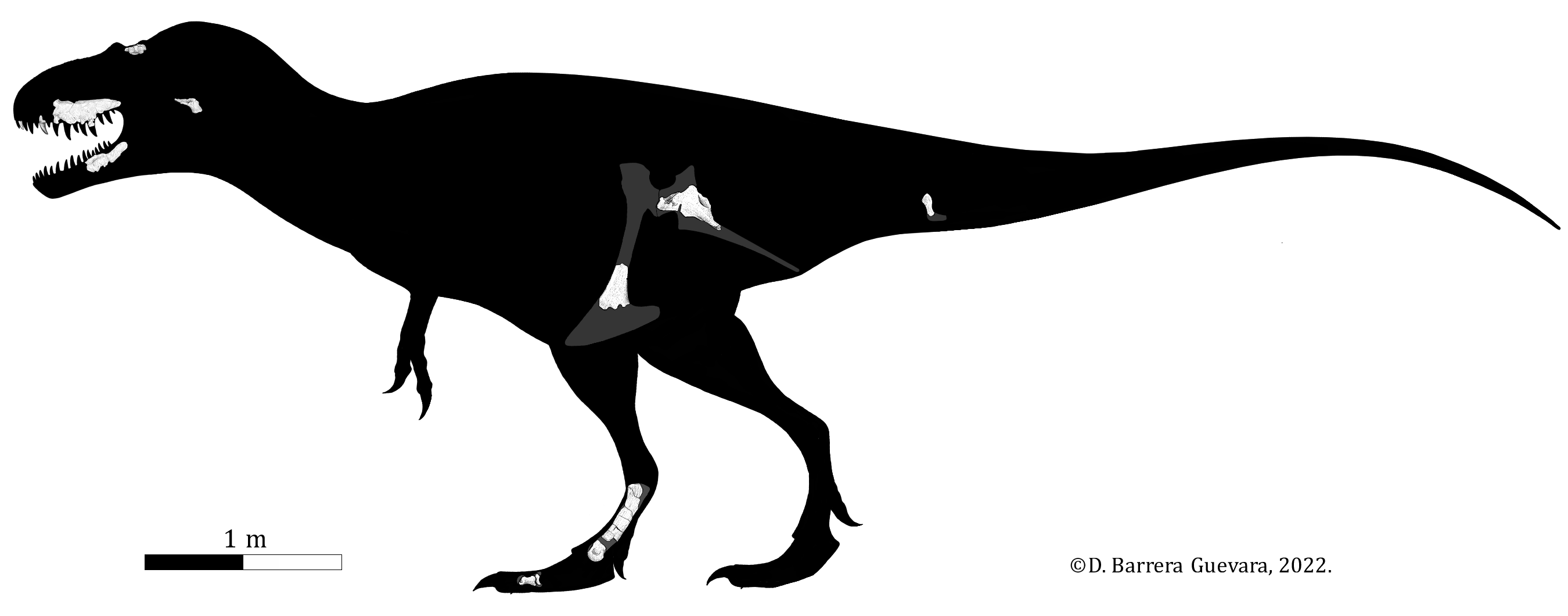
- Known remains of L. anomala
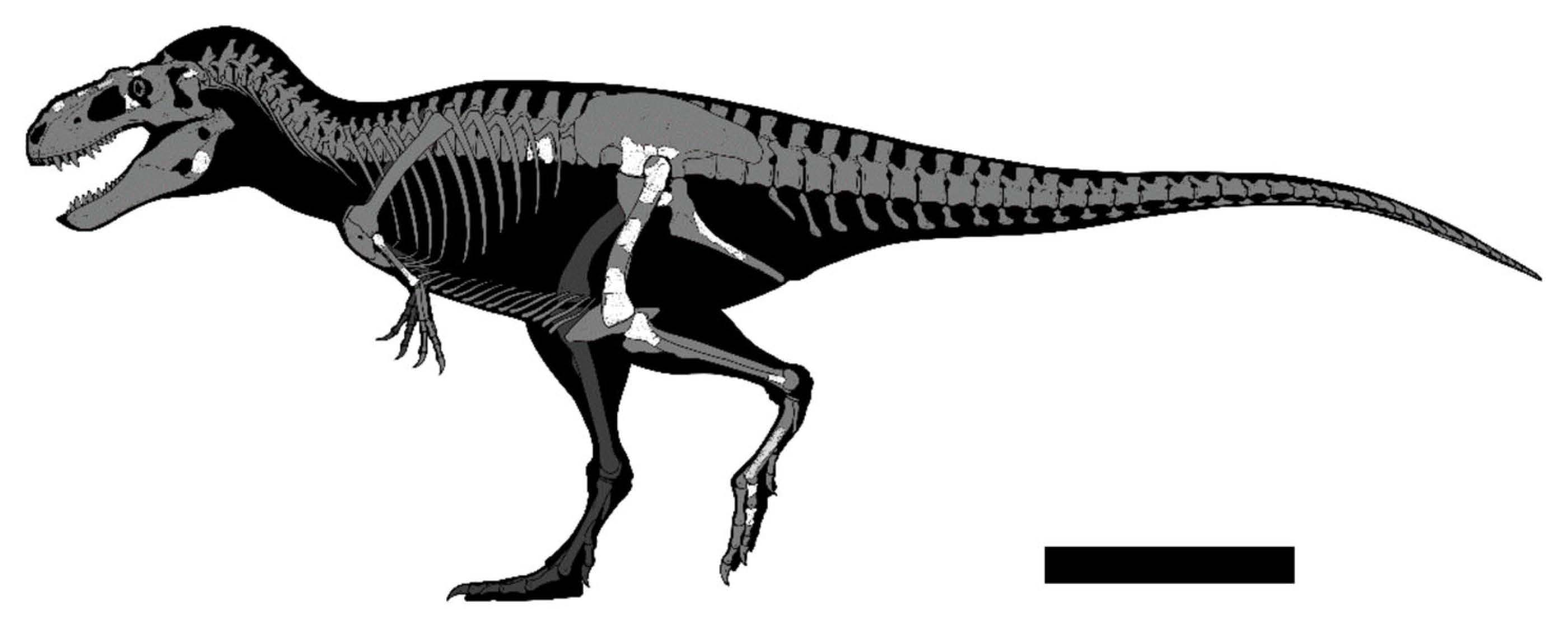
- Known remains of L. aguillonae

Scientific classification
- Kingdom: Animalia
- Phylum: Chordata
- Class: Reptilia
- Clade: Dinosauria
- Clade: Saurischia
- Clade: Theropoda
- Superfamily: †Tyrannosauroidea
- Family: †Tyrannosauridae
- Clade: †Teratophoneini (?)
- Genus: †Labocania; Molnar, 1974

Type species
- †Labocania anomala Molnar, 1974

Other species
- †L. aguillonae Rivera-Sylva & Longrich, 2024

= Labocania =

Labocania Temporal range: Late Cretaceous, possibly Cenomanian–Campanian

Genus of tyrannosaurid dinosaurs

Labocania is an extinct genus of theropod dinosaur of disputed affinities, known from the Late Cretaceous of Mexico. Initially regarded as an indeterminate theropod, later studies have mentioned possible affinities with tyrannosaurids, abelisaurids, or carcharodontosaurids. More recent research based on additional fossil material found support for a position within the tyrannosaurine clade Teratophoneini. Two species have been proposed: L. anomala (the type species), likely from the La Bocana Roja Formation, and L. aguillonae from the Cerro del Pueblo Formation.

== Discovery ==
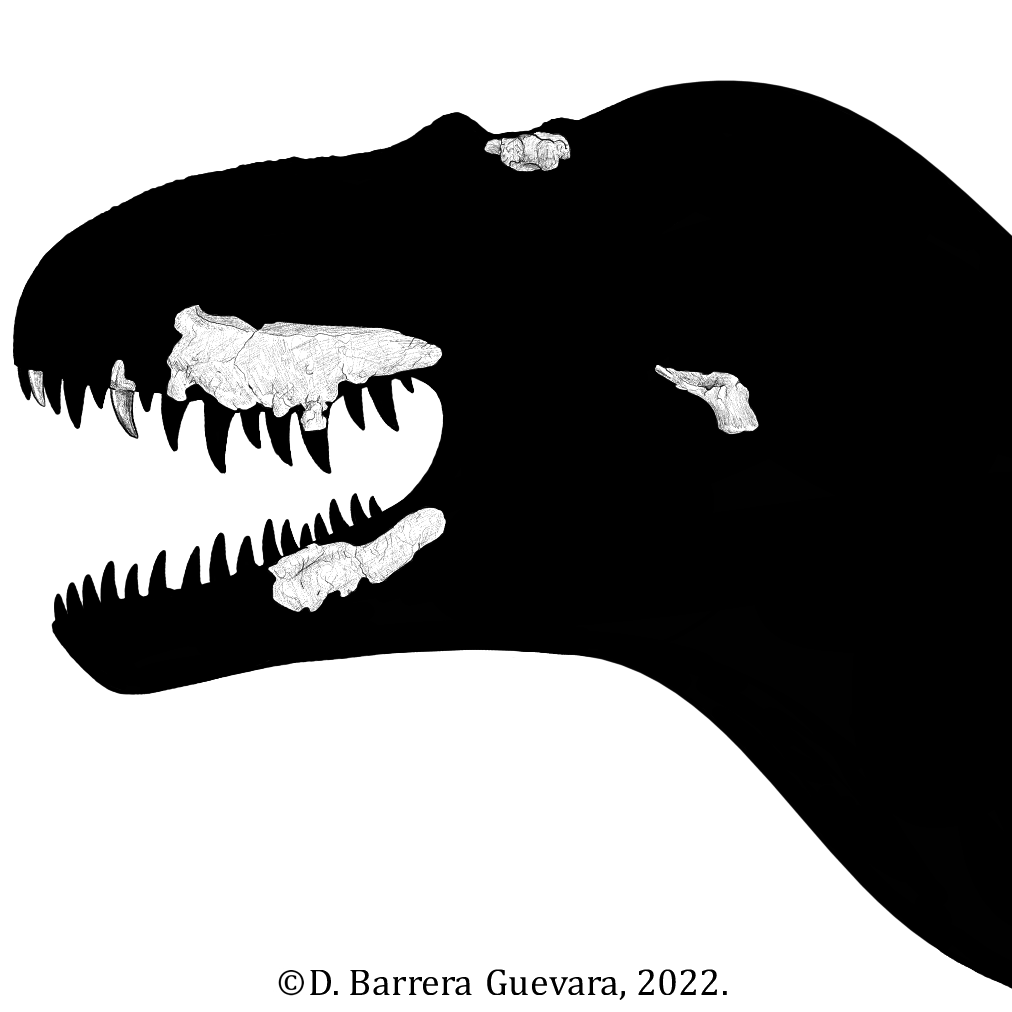
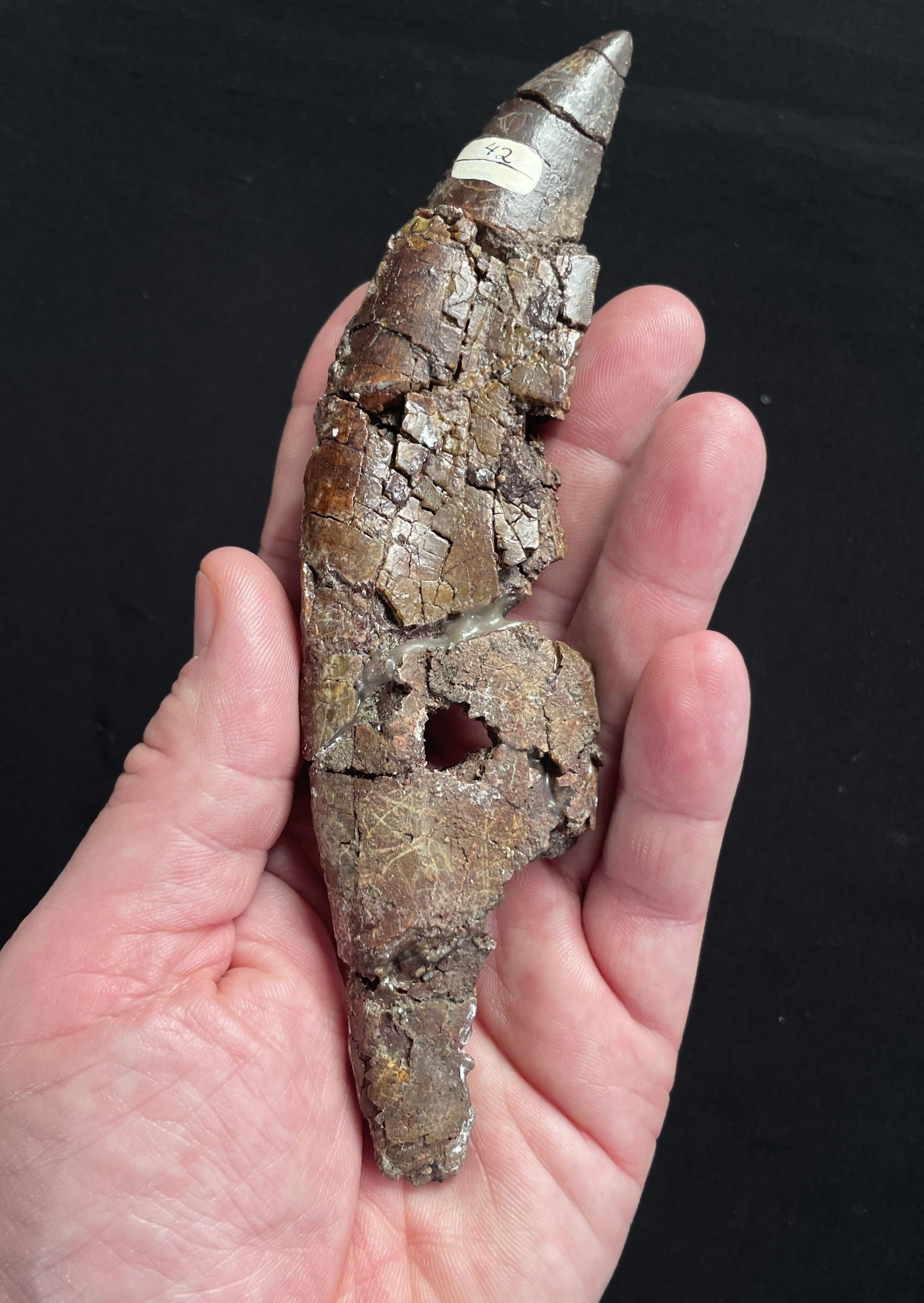
Known skull remains (left) and tooth (right) of L. anomala

In the summer of 1970, the National Geographic Society and the Los Angeles County Museum of Natural History organized a joint paleontological expedition, led by geologist William J. Morris, to the Arroyo del Rosario in Baja California, Mexico. While prospecting, volunteer Harley J. Garbani discovered the fragmentary skeleton of a theropod north of Punta Baja near Cerro Rayado.

The collected specimen, IGM 5307 (formerly LACM 20877), was found in a layer of what is likely the La Bocana Roja Formation, originally thought to date from the late Campanian, about 73 million years old. More recent research has provided conflicting dates, possibly as old as around 93.6 million years old (Cenomanian–Turonian), but vertebrate remains suggest a younger age. The specimen consists of a very fragmentary skeleton with skull elements, including a right quadrate, a left frontal, a piece of the left maxilla, a fragment of the dentary, a chevron, the upper parts of both ischia, the middle shaft of the right pubis, most of the second right metatarsal, a toe bone and several loose teeth. The elements were found disarticulated and strongly weathered, dispersed over a surface of about two square meters. The remains were mixed with the ribs of a hadrosauroid.

In 1974, Ralph Molnar described the type species, Labocania anomala, based on these remains. The generic name references the La Bocana Roja Formation, named after la Bocana Roja, "the red estuary". The specific name means "anomalous" in Latin, in reference to the distinctive morphology.

In 2024, Rivera-Sylva & Longrich described a second species, Labocania aguillonae, based on fragmentary remains found in the Campanian-aged Cerro del Pueblo Formation of Coahuila, Mexico. The specific name honors the discoverer of the specimen, Martha C. Aguillon, a long-time paleontologist based in Coahuila. The holotype, CPC 2974, comprises parts of a maxilla, the frontals, left lacrimal, nasals, left squamosal, cervical, dorsal, sacral, and caudal vertebrae, left humerus, partial pelvic girdle, and partial left hindlimb. CPC 3077, a partial left dentary belonging to a larger, more mature individual, was tentatively referred to L. aguillonae.

== Description ==
Labocania was a medium-sized carnivore. In 2010, Gregory S. Paul estimated the length of L. anomala at 7 metres (23 ft) and its weight at 1.5 long tons (1.7 short tons). In 2016, Molina-Pérez & Larramendi gave a higher estimate of 8.2 metres (27 ft) meters long and 2.6 long tons (2.9 short tons) in weight. The holotype of L. aguillonae which belongs to either a subadult or a young adult is smaller, at an estimated 6.3 metres (21 ft) long. A tentatively referred specimen belongs to a larger individual.

The cranial elements are very robust, and the frontals in particular are strongly thickened. The teeth of the maxilla are gradually recurving and rather flat; those of the premaxilla do not have a D-shaped cross-section.

== Classification ==
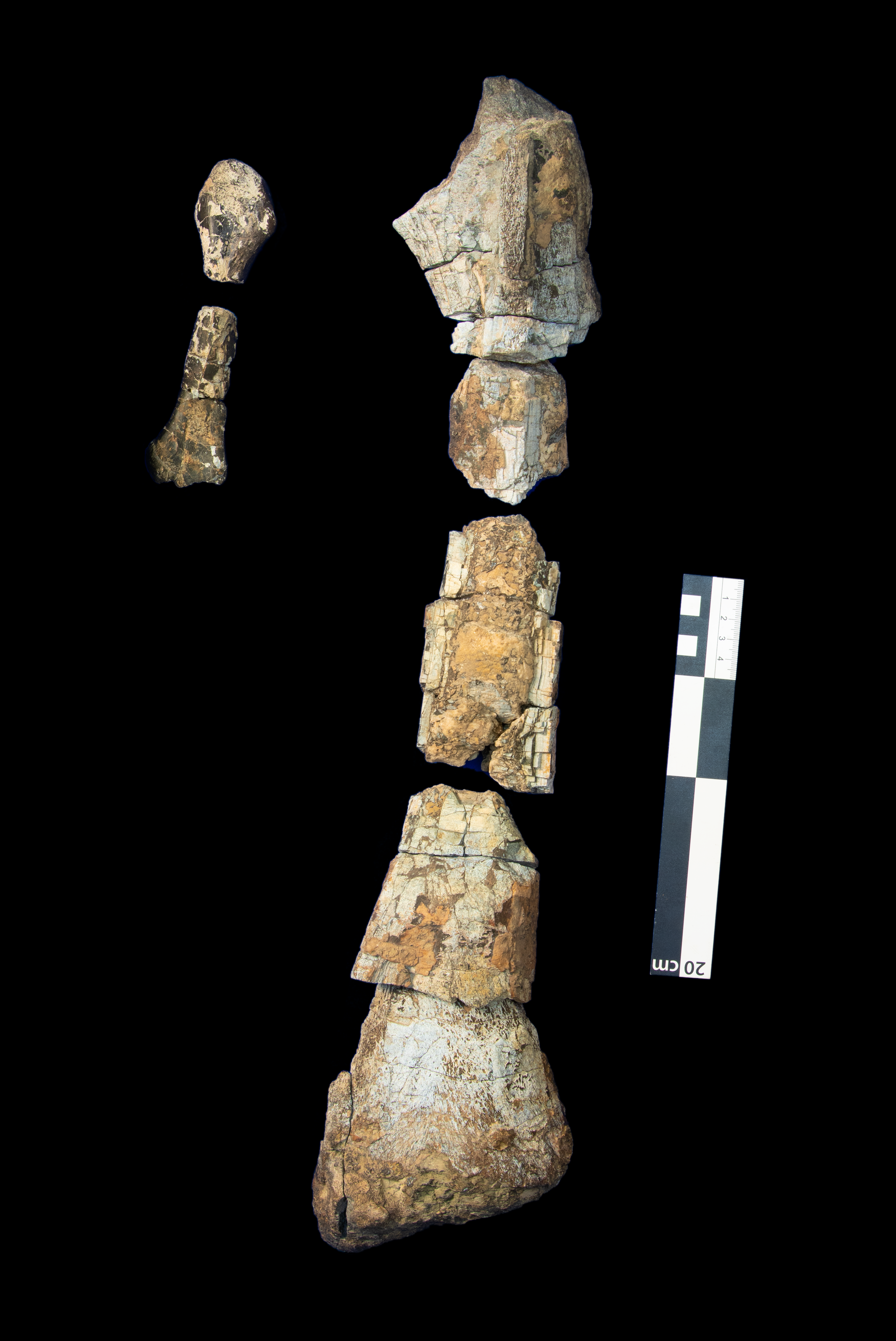
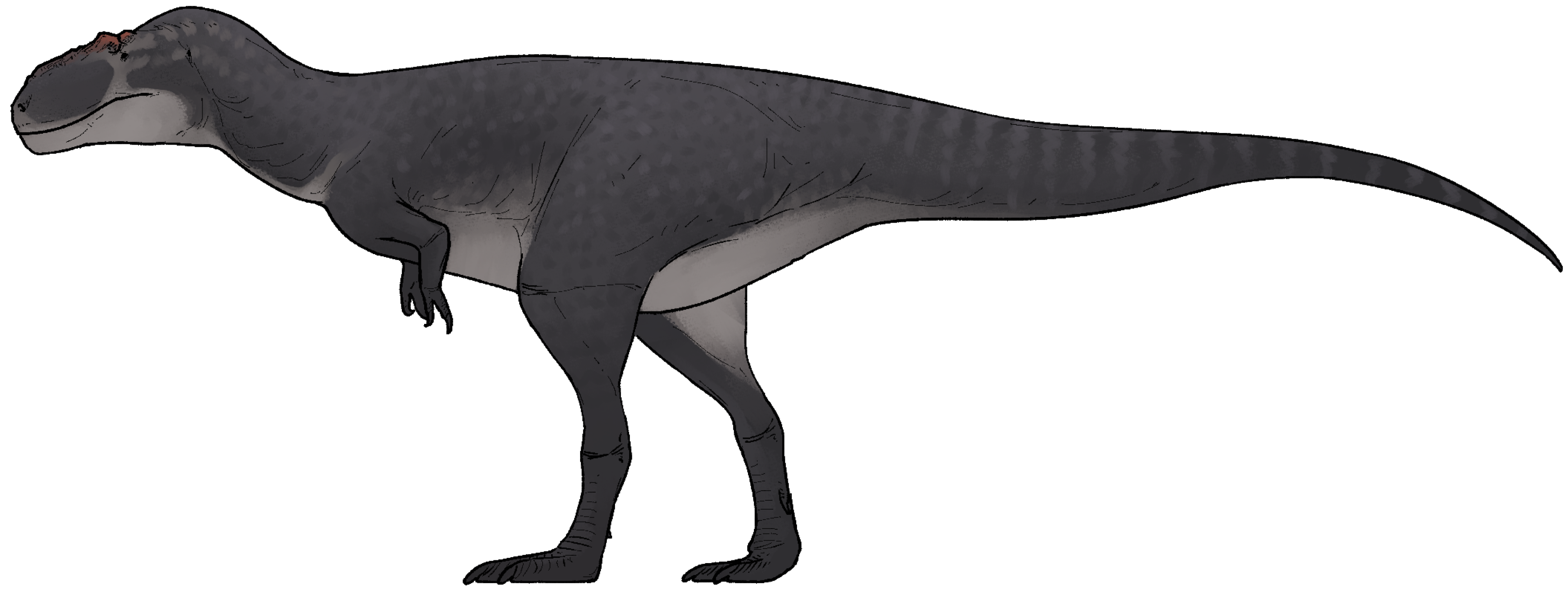
Humerus and femur (left) and speculative life restoration (right) of L. aguillonae

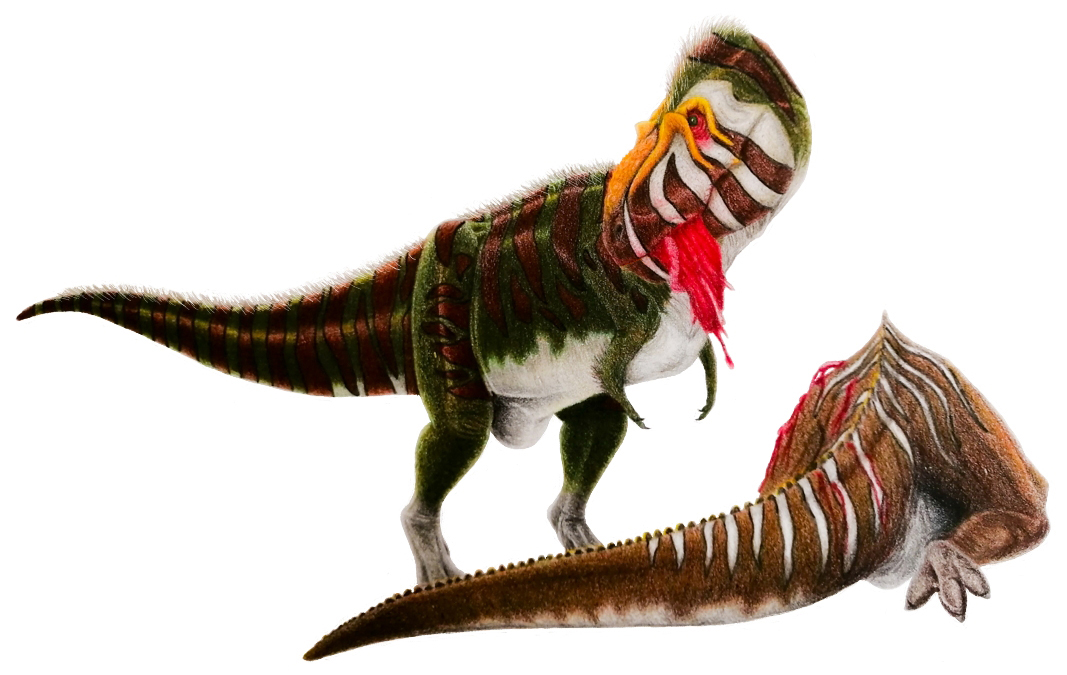
Speculative life restoration of L. anomala feeding on a hadrosaur

Because Labocania is based on fragmentary material, its affinities are uncertain. Molnar (1974) noted certain similarities between Labocania and tyrannosaurids, especially in the form of the ischium which features a low triangular obturator process and a circular lateral scar on the upper end, but he did not assign Labocania to any family, placing it as Theropoda incertae sedis. Molnar especially compared Labocania with "Chilantaisaurus" maortuensis (later made the separate genus Shaochilong) and Indosaurus. Labocania was considered as a possible tyrannosauroid in the 2004 review of the group by Thomas R. Holtz Jr., who pointed out that the similarities with the Tyrannosauridae were shared with the Coelurosauria in general—no tyrannosauroid synapomorphies were present—and that Labocania also showed some abelisaurid traits such as the thick frontals and a reclining quadrate. The L-shaped chevron and the flattened outer side of the second metatarsal support a position in the Tetanurae.

In 2024, Andrea Cau included L. anomala in a large-scale phylogenetic dataset and recovered it as a carcharodontosaurid forming a clade with Shaochilong.

In their description of theropod material assigned to the new Labocania species L. aguillonae, Rivera-Sylva & Longrich (2024) found support for a position within the tyrannosaurine clade Teratophoneini. Their phylogenetic analyses recovered Labocania in a clade with Bistahieversor, Dynamoterror, Teratophoneus, and two unnamed taxa from the Aguja and Two Medicine formations. Their results are displayed in the cladogram below:

- - Alioramini
  - Tyrannosauridae
    - Nanotyrannus
    - - Albertosaurinae
      - Tyrannosaurinae
        - Asiatyrannus
        - - Daspletosaurini
          - - Lythronax
            - - - Nanuqsaurus
                - Tyrannosaurini
                  - Tyrannosaurus spp.
                  - - Tarbosaurus
                    - Zhuchengtyrannus
              - Teratophoneini
                - Dynamoterror
                - Teratophoneus
                - - Aguja Fm. tyrannosaurine
                  - Bistahieversor
                  - Two Medicine Fm. tyrannosaurine
                  - - Labocania anomala
                    - Labocania aguillonae

In their 2025 description of the early tyrannosauroid Khankhuuluu, Voris and colleagues regarded L. aguillonae as a nomen dubium due to a lack of clearly distinguishable traits compared to other southern tyrannosaurids, as they found none of the proposed diagnostic characters to be unique to this taxon.
