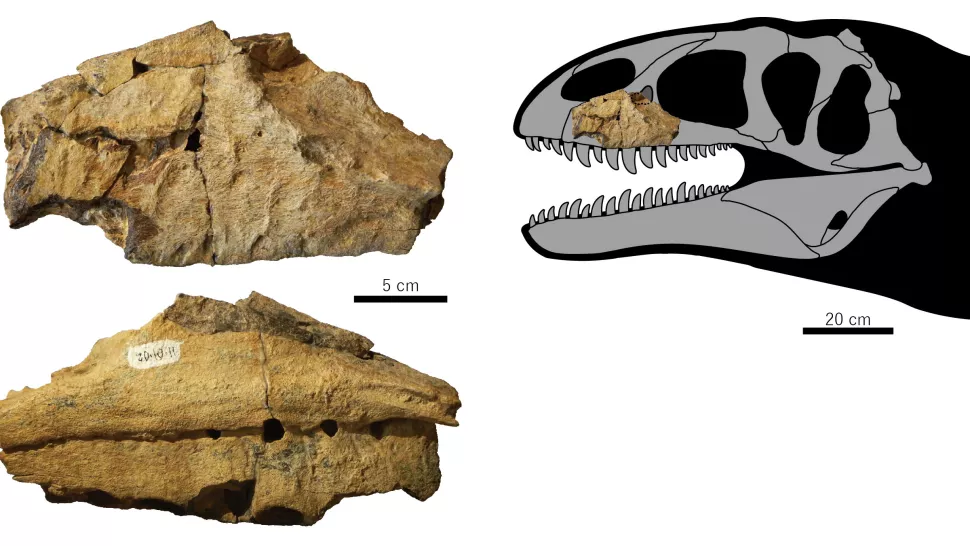
- Holotype maxilla fragment

Scientific classification
- Kingdom: Animalia
- Phylum: Chordata
- Class: Reptilia
- Clade: Dinosauria
- Clade: Saurischia
- Clade: Theropoda
- Clade: †Carcharodontosauria
- Family: †Carcharodontosauridae
- Genus: †Ulughbegsaurus; Tanaka et al., 2021

Type species
- †Ulughbegsaurus uzbekistanensis Tanaka et al., 2021

= Ulughbegsaurus =

Ulughbegsaurus Temporal range: Late Cretaceous, (Cenomanian–Turonian)

Genus of carcharodontosaurian dinosaurs

Ulughbegsaurus (meaning "Ulugh Beg's lizard") is an extinct genus of carcharodontosaurid theropod dinosaurs from the Late Cretaceous Bissekty Formation (Turonian age) and Khodzhakul Formation (Cenomanian age) of Uzbekistan. The genus contains a single species, Ulughbegsaurus uzbekistanensis, known from multiple maxilla fragments.

== Discovery and naming ==
The Ulughbegsaurus fossil material was discovered in the Bissekty Formation, Uzbekistan in the 1980s. The holotype specimen, UzSGM 11-01-02, consists of a partial left maxilla. This specimen remained in the collection of the State Geological Museum of the State Committee of the Republic of Uzbekistan on Geology and Mineral Resources, Tashkent, Uzbekistan, until 2019, when it was rediscovered. Two additional specimens have been referred to the genus, including CCMGE 600/12457, the jugal ramus of a left maxilla that was previously referred to the dromaeosaurid Itemirus, and ZIN PH 357/16, the posterior end of a right maxilla.

Isolated teeth from the Bissekty Formation show similarities to carcharodontosaurians, suggesting they may belong to Ulughbegsaurus or possibly another genus of carcharodontosaurian.

In 2021, Tanaka and colleagues described Ulughbegsaurus uzbekistanensis as a new genus and species of theropod dinosaur. The genus name, Ulughbegsaurus, honours the 15th-century Timurid sultan, mathematician and astronomer Ulugh Beg. The specific name, uzbekistanensis, references the country of its discovery.

A partial Acrocanthosaurus-like posterior dorsal vertebra described in 2024 has also been found in the Bissekty Formation, which could belong to Ulughbegsaurus. In 2025, Averianov et al. described a right maxilla fragment (specimen ZIN PH 2368/16) from the early Cenomanian Khodzhakul Formation of Uzbekistan as belonging to Ulughbegsaurus sp.

== Description ==
In their description of Ulughbegsaurus, Tanaka et al. (2021) estimated the body length of this taxon at 7.5–8 metres (25–26 ft) and its body mass at over 1,000 kilograms (2,200 lb). Since it is known only from incomplete and non-overlapping pieces of the maxilla, these approximations used a reconstructed version of this bone to calculate the animal's total length. Based on a new specimen that overlapped both the holotype and referred specimen (jugal ramus), Averianov et al. (2025) determined that the total length of the maxilla would have been smaller, slightly reducing the size of Ulughbegsaurus to around 7.4 metres (24 ft).

== Classification ==
Tanaka et al. (2021) ran two phylogenetic analyses using two different datasets to determine the relationships of Ulughbegsaurus. The first placed it in a polytomy including Neovenator and other megaraptorans, while the second placed it in a polytomy including other basal carcharodontosaurians; megaraptorans were instead recovered as members of the Tyrannosauroidea. Both analyses are shown below:

Topology 1: Hendrickx & Mateus dataset

- Allosauroidea
  - Metriacanthosauridae
  - - Allosauridae
    - Carcharodontosauria
      - Carcharodontosauridae
      - Neovenatoridae
        - Aerosteon
        - Australovenator
        - Chilantaisaurus
        - Fukuiraptor
        - Megaraptor
        - Neovenator
        - Ulughbegsaurus

Topology 2: Chokchaloemwong et al. dataset

- Allosauroidea
  - - Monolophosaurus
    - Sinraptor
  - - Allosaurus
    - Carcharodontosauria
      - Concavenator
      - Eocarcharia
      - Neovenator
      - Siamraptor
      - Ulughbegsaurus
      - - Acrocanthosaurus
        - - Shaochilong
          - Carcharodontosaurinae

A 2022 study suggested that the taxon was a nomen dubium due to lacking diagnostic features, and that it was plausible that the maxilla fragment originated from a dromaeosaurid instead. However, these authors later commented that the discovery of a second maxilla fragment from older Uzbekistani rocks, comparable to the Ulughbegsaurus holotype and referable to this genus, confirmed that it is a valid carcharodontosaurian taxon. They further argued that, based on characters shared with Carcharodontosaurus, Ulughbegsaurus can most likely be referred to the Carcharodontosauridae.

== Paleoecology ==
Ulughbegsaurus coexisted in the Bissekty Formation environment with other carnivorous theropods, including the tyrannosauroid Timurlengia and the dromaeosaurid Itemirus, as well as other dinosaurs, mammals, amphibians and fish.
