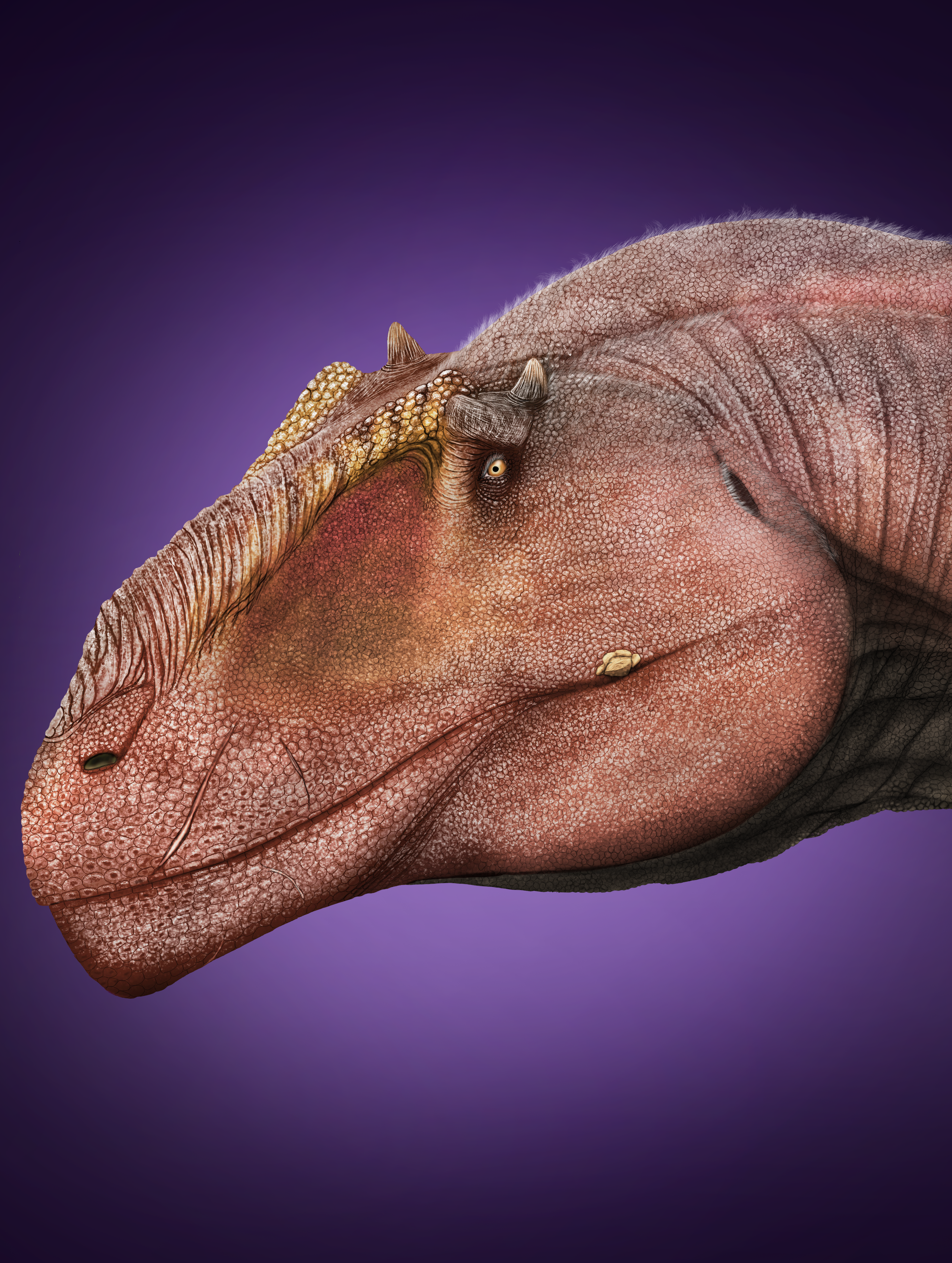
- Reconstruction of the head of Taurovenator

Scientific classification
- Kingdom: Animalia
- Phylum: Chordata
- Class: Reptilia
- Clade: Dinosauria
- Clade: Saurischia
- Clade: Theropoda
- Family: †Carcharodontosauridae
- Tribe: †Giganotosaurini
- Genus: †Taurovenator; Motta et al., 2016

Type species
- †Taurovenator violantei Motta et al., 2016

= Taurovenator =

Taurovenator Temporal range: Early Cretaceous (Albian), 106.2 Ma

Extinct genus of theropod dinosaurs

Taurovenator, from Latin taurus, meaning "bull", and venator, meaning "hunter", is an extinct genus of large, probable carcharodontosaurid theropod dinosaurs that lived in what is now Argentina during the Albian age of the Early Cretaceous, around 106.2 million years ago. Initially only known from a single postorbital skull bone described from the Huincul Formation, Taurovenator violantei was named in 2016 by Argentine paleontologist Matias Motta and colleagues. Debate came about over the validity of the species, with some paleontologists arguing that Taurovenator was synonymous with the earlier-named carcharodontosaurid Mapusaurus. However, the 2024 description of a well-preserved partial skull and skeleton referrable to Taurovenator aided in distinguishing the two taxa.

== Discovery and naming ==
=== Initial discovery and description ===
In 2005, a right postorbital of a theropod dinosaur was unearthed by Argentine paleontologist Matias Motta from a section of sandstone strata deriving from the lower member of the Huincul Formation, dating to the Cenomanian stage of the Late Cretaceous (95-93.9 million years old). The strata located on the Violante Farm, a farm located in Rio Negro Province, Argentina. This fossil was found in the vicinity of the megaraptoran Aoniraptor, several abelisauroids, and a possible unenlagiine paravian. The fossils recovered were then transported to the Museo Provincial "Carlos Ameghino", with the isolated postorbital deposited under catalogue number MPCA-Pv 803. This postorbital remained undescribed until in 2016, when Matias Motta and colleagues described the postorbital as the holotype (name-bearing specimen) of a new genus and species of carcharodontosaurid dinosaur, Taurovenator violantei. Taurovenator was then the second carcharodontosaurid described from the Huincul Formation, with Mapusaurus named in 2006 based on several incomplete skeletons. The generic name Taurovenator means "bull hunter", derived from the Latin roots taurus "bull" and venor "hunter" whereas the specific name is in honor of Violante Farm where the postorbital was unearthed.

=== Validity debate and additional specimen ===
Taurovenator went largely unnoticed due to its fragmentary nature, with Coria et al. (2019) suggesting that Taurovenator is synonymous with Mapusaurus, considering both of its original autapomorphies as shared with Mapusaurus and also pointing out that both taxa shared a curved lateral margin of the palpebral. Additionally, the authors considered that there was a high likelihood of them being coeval, however, Taurovenator is actually from the lower unit of the Huincul Formation, while Mapusaurus is from the upper unit of the formation. Researcher Mickey Mortimer also believed that Taurovenator was synonymous with Mapusaurus due to the lack of sufficient material and diagnostic traits for the genus. In 2022, another carcharodontosaurid from the Huincul Formation, Meraxes, was named on the basis of a well-preserved skull and partial skeleton from the same strata as Taurovenator. In their description of Meraxes, the authors stated that Taurovenator lacks sufficient diagnostic characters and may be coeval with Meraxes.

Notably in the same site on Violante Farm as the Taurovenator holotype, an associated skeleton (MPCA-Pv 803) including a partial skull and posterior (back portion) mandible, incomplete cervical (neck vertebrae) series, fragments of dorsal (back) vertebrae, several ribs, two partial forelimbs, a femur (thighbone), a partial pes (foot), gastralia, and a caudal vertebra was unearthed along with the Taurovenator holotype in 2005 but were regarded as belonging to an indeterminate carcharodontosaurid in the 2016 description of Taurovenator. Additionally, the material of MPCA-Pv 803 had not been completely collected, prepared, or made available for study, delaying its description. These fossils were also spread out over a sizeable area and intermingled with bones of an indeterminate sauropod. In 2024, this specimen was described and, despite not overlapping in material with the holotype, was referred to Taurovenator. This was done for several reasons: the holotype fits perfectly with MPCA-Pv 803 suggesting they may be from the same individual, the close proximity to the holotype (the specimen was found 800 metres (870 yd) away from the holotype's dig site, and the fossils are congruent in size. In an analysis of the strata from which the holotype was discovered, the 2024 study noted that the Huincul Formation is separated into two distinct sequences; a lower section of thin, multicolored sandstones and an upper section of thick conglomeratic sediments. Mapusaurus derives from the upper sequence of the formation, whereas Meraxes and Taurovenator are exclusive to the lower rock layers. Meraxes, however, was collected in strata close to the Candeleros-Huincul Formation boundary, whereas Taurovenator's specimens were found over 30 meters above the Candeleros-Huincul Formation limit. It is for these reasons that the three carcharodontosaurids found at Huincul were potentially not coeval, supporting the argument for Taurovenator's validity. Additionally, the holotype preserve features of the Giganotosaurini, further supporting its referral to Taurovenator. A new host of diagnostic traits were found on the bones of MPCA-Pv 803, properly demonstrating its distinctiveness from Mapusaurus and Meraxes.

== Description ==
Taurovenator is a very large carcharodontosaurid. It had an estimated body mass of 5,728 kg (12,628 lb), 5.728 metric tons (6.314 short tons), based on a formula that utilizes the circumference of the femur to predict body mass. For reference, this is smaller than Giganotosaurus 6,349 kilograms (13,997 lb), but larger than Meraxes and Mapusaurus, 4,263 kilograms (9,398 lb) and 4,343 kilograms (9,575 lb), respectively). This puts Taurovenator among the largest theropod dinosaurs known and therefore one of the biggest terrestrial carnivores known to science, though still smaller than genera like Tyrannosaurus and Spinosaurus.

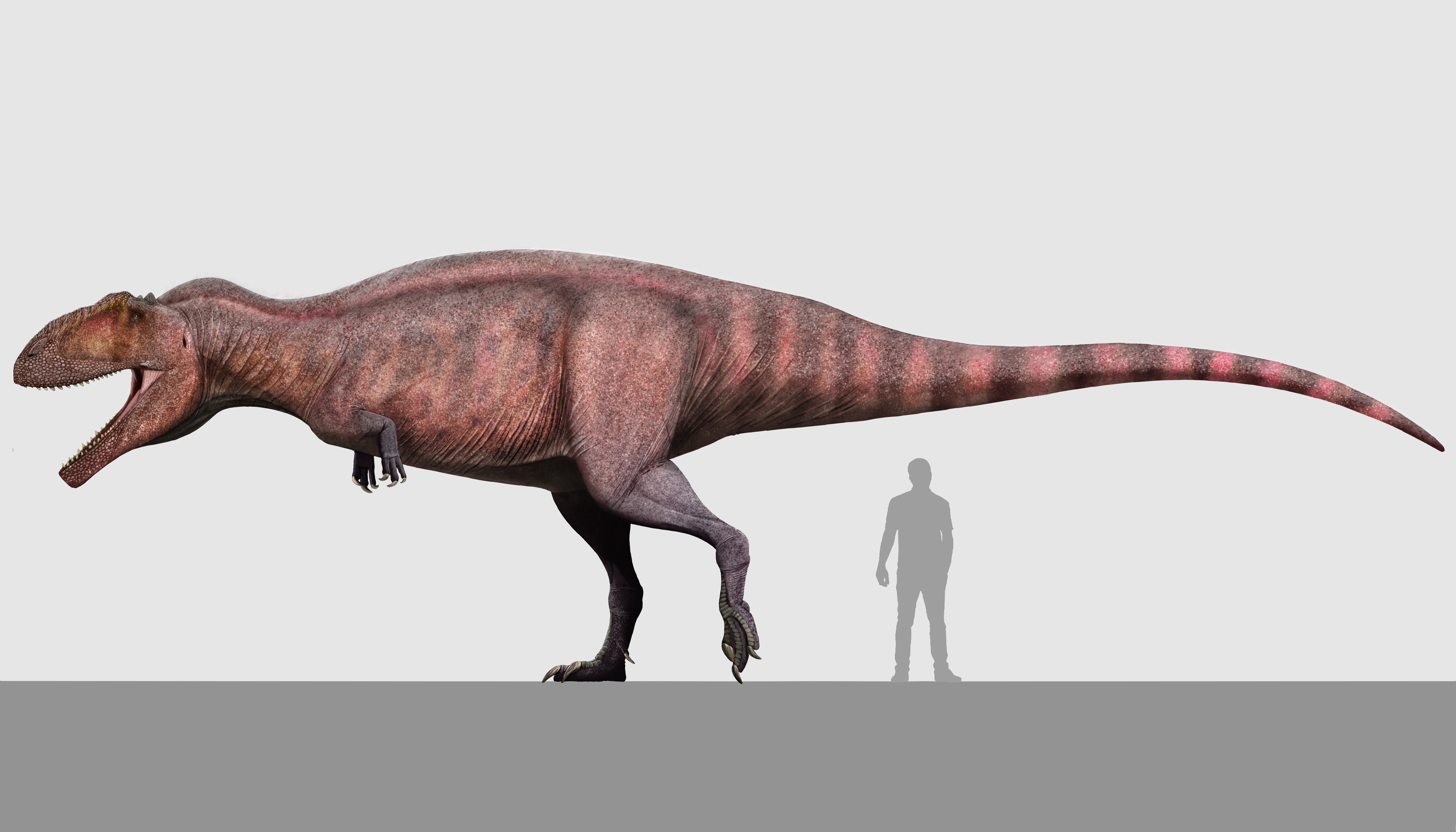
Taurovenator life reconstruction, compared to a person.

=== Skull ===
The skull of Taurovenator is known from the holotype postorbital in addition to the cranial and mandibular elements of MPCA-Pv 803 which include: both jugals (cheekbones), left quadrate (skull bone articulating with the lower jaw), left palatine (main palate bone), right ectopterygoid (smaller palate bone), both surangulars and angulars (back of lower jaw bones), prearticulars (rearmost lower jaw bone), left articular (lower jaw bone articulating with the skull), right ceratohyal (throat bone), and three isolated teeth. The maximum length of the skull of MPCA-Pv 803 was estimated to be around 135 centimetres (4.43 ft) based on the more complete skulls of relatives like Meraxes. The postorbital is strongly rugose and projected out like a horn, markedly different from the orbital bosses of other carcharodontosaurids. Both Motta et al., 2016 and Rolando et al., 2024 consider this a unique trait, but its sister taxon Meraxes too has a postorbital that was described as laterally projecting out like a horn. The 2024 description of MPCA-Pv 803 however argued that this horn-like projection is distinct from that of Meraxes, with the projection measuring 3–4 centimetres (1.2–1.6 in) in height and 2–3 centimetres (0.79–1.18 in) in diameter. In addition, there is a deep fossa (depression in bone) and excavation on the ventral surface of the postorbital. Though the excavations are observable in the postorbitals of Mapusaurus, Meraxes, and other carcharodontosaurids, they all do not preserve the unique fossa found on the Taurovenator holotype.

The jugal is long and sub-triangular in shape with a slightly posteromedially (backwards) pointed postorbital ramus. Its lateral (exposed side) surface is rugose with a thick shelf, a condition similarly observed in South American carcharodontosaurids like Tyrannotitan and Meraxes but absent from the jugals of other allosauroids. The anterior (front) process of the jugal is compressed and bears an ovular pneumatic foramen (pits in bone for air sac systems) on its articulating (contacting) surface with the lacrimal. The quadrate of MPCA-PV 803 is distinctly stout, triangular in lateral view, bearing a large, anteriorly projected pterygoid flange as in related genera. The pterygoid fossa is wide, subdivided by a crest, and lacks pneumaticity as in contemporary carcharodontosaurids of its time. In contrast the palatine of Taurovenator is tetraradiate with an anteriorly expanded vomeropterygoid process (expansion), a short and sub-triangular pterygoid process, a narrow jugal process, and an elongated maxillary process. The ectopterygoid is C-shaped from dorsoventral (top and bottom) views with a pneumatic recess on its medial surface, a trait in other tetanurans. A distinguishing feature of Taurovenator's pterygoid is the thin, long jugal process which is longer than those of Meraxes and Giganotosaurus. As for the mandible, only the posterior portion is known from Taurovenator. It preserves a robust and dorsoventrally (top-down) high morphology, akin to the mandibles of Acrocanthosaurus, Tyrannosaurus, and other tyrannosauroids. Two teeth are preserved from Taurovenator, both of which are large, around 4 centimetres (1.6 in) in length. The margins of these teeth are convex and straight, with chisel-like denticles which number around 8.5 per 5 millimetres (0.20 in) at the mid-crown and 11 per 5 millimetres (0.20 in) at the base. Their blood grooves are well developed and their enamel wrinkles are notably deep, a distinct characteristic of carcharodontosaurid teeth.

=== Postcrania ===
Distinctively, Taurovenator's neck vertebrae bore prominent neural spines with flange-like dorsal tips. As a result, the neural spines of cervical vertebrae C3-C6 are "imbricated", ie interlocking with each other. The authors describing this morphology termed this unusual structure a "cervical complex", and likened them to overlapping roof tiles. A similar, though less extreme condition is also known in the C3-C5 of the more basal carcharodontosaurid Acrocanthosaurus. Available information of Giganotosaurus and Mapusaurus further suggests that this "cervical complex" is a unique synapomorphy of the group. The presence of the cervical complex would have likely restricted the range of movement of the cervical vertebrae. On the other hand, the skull of Taurovenator and other carcharodontosaurids had a ball-shaped occipital condyle similar to that seen in the skulls of ceratopsian dinosaurs. This could have allowed a large range of rotational movement between the skull and the first cervical vertebra. Furthermore, the cervical complex of Taurovenator could have similar functional implications to those of the syncervical vertebrae (ie fused C1-C3 vertebrae) of ceratopsians, strengthening the anterior region of the neck, and increasing the surface area for epaxial cervico-cranial muscles.

Only remains of two dorsal vertebrae are known. One is composed of a centrum, but the other is composed of a very tall, 52 centimetres (20 in) high neural arch. This neural spine preserves strong laminae that form an "H"-shaped cross-section and a saddle shape at the top, traits found in the high-spined Acrocanthosaurus. As for the appendicular skeleton, the forelimbs are nearly completely preserved, missing only the carpals and ungual phalanges. Taurovenator had proportionately some of the smallest arms of all known allosauroids, being 65-68% of the length of the femur. The nearly completely preserved arms were reduced to a greater degree than even in other carcharodontosaurids, being proportionately smaller than that of taxa such as Meraxes, particularly where the forearm is concerned. Despite such limb reduction, the forearms were robust, and the digits had a great degree of flexibility. Nonetheless like other giganotosaurines, the forelimbs were likely incapable of a wide range of movement. The left femur is known, with a preserved length of 113 centimetres (44 in) and an estimated complete length of 118 centimetres (46 in). The shaft of the femur is straightened with a weak fourth trochanter, a feature of many carcharodontosaurid femora. Taurovenator also shares with Meraxes an enlarged ungual claw on the second toe, approximately 20% longer than the equivalent phalanx of the third toe and more laterally compressed.

== Classification ==
Motta et al. (2016) suggested that Taurovenator occupied a derived position within Carcharodontosauridae, comparing it to Giganotosaurus, Carcharodontosaurus and Mapusaurus in particular. Coria et al. (2019) suggested that Taurovenator is synonymous with Mapusaurus, considering both of its original autapomorphies as shared with Mapusaurus and also pointing out that both taxa shared a curved lateral margin of the palpebral. Additionally, the authors considered that there was a high likelihood of them being coeval, however, Taurovenator is actually from the lower unit of the Huincul Formation, while Mapusaurus is from the upper unit of the formation. Rolando et al. (2024) reaffirmed Taurovenator's validity, considering the autapomorphies preserved on the holotype as more strongly developed in Taurovenator than any other carcharodontosaurid, while also considering the supposedly diagnostic curved margin of the palpebral as a more widely distributed feature in Carcharodontosauridae.

In order to test the systematics of Taurovenator with the information supplemented by the new specimen, the study used the phylogenetic dataset used in the description of Meraxes, with some additional data. The results of their phylogenetic analysis are shown in a cladogram below:

- Carcharodontosauridae
  - Neovenator
  - - Eocarcharia
    - - Lajasvenator
      - Acrocanthosaurus
      - Carcharodontosaurinae
        - Lusovenator
        - Shaochilong
        - Carcharodontosaurus saharicus
        - Carcharodontosaurus iguidensis
        - Giganotosaurini
          - Tyrannotitan
          - - Giganotosaurus
            - - Mapusaurus
              - - Meraxes
                - Taurovenator

In 2025, Cau and Paterna recovered Taurovenator as an allosauroid outside Carcharodontosauridae.

- Carnosauria
  - Megalosauroidea phylogenetic position of Eocarcharia (holotype + skull roof)
    ⊞
    - - Poekilopleuron
      - Piatnitzkysaurus
      - Marshosaurus
      - Condorraptor
    - - Afrovenator
      - - - - Torvosaurus tanneri
            - Megalosaurus
          - - Magnosaurus
            - Duriavenator
        - - Wiehenvenator
          - Vallibonavenatrix
          - Leshansaurus
          - Spinosauridae
            - - Ichthyovenator
              - - Sigilmassasaurus
                - Spinosaurus (holotype)
                - "Spinosaurus B"
                - Spinosaurus (Kem Kem morph)
            - Baryonychinae
              - Baryonyx
              - Ceratosuchopsini
                - - Suchomimus
                  - Eocarcharia
                    (holotype + skull roof)
                - - Riparovenator
                  - Ceratosuchops
    ⊟
  - Allosauroidea phylogenetic position of the referred "Eocarcharia" maxilla
    - Asfaltovenator
    - - Monolophosaurus
      - - Metriacanthosauridae
        - - Lourinhanosaurus
          - - Allosaurus
            - - - Taurovenator (holotype)
                - Siamraptor
                - Piveteausaurus
                - Concavenator
              - - Neovenator
                - Carcharodontosauridae
                  - Eocarcharia
                    (referred maxilla)
                  - - - Veterupristisaurus
                      - Lusovenator
                      - Lajasvenator
                      - Acrocanthosaurus
                    - - Other carcharodontosaurids ⟹

== Palaeoenvironment ==
Several dinosaurs from the Huincul Formation (Taurovenator is not figured)

Taurovenator was discovered in the Argentine Province of Neuquén. It was found in the Huincul Formation, a rock formation bordering the Río Limay Subgroup, the latter of which is a subdivision of the Neuquén Group. This unit is located in the Neuquén Basin in Patagonia. The Huincul Formation is composed of yellowish and greenish sandstones of fine-to-medium grain, some of which are tuffaceous. hese deposits were laid down during the Lower Cretaceous. Earlier findings suggested a Cenomanian–Turonian age, or possibly an Early Turonian to Late Santonian age. The deposits represent the drainage system of a braided river.

Fossilised pollen indicates a wide variety of plants were present in the Huincul Formation. A study of the El Zampal section of the formation found hornworts, liverworts, ferns, Selaginellales, possible Noeggerathiales, gymnosperms (including gnetophytes and conifers), and angiosperms (flowering plants), in addition to several pollen grains of unknown affinities. The Huincul Formation is among the richest Patagonian vertebrate associations, preserving fish including dipnoans and gar, chelid turtles, squamates, sphenodonts, neosuchian crocodilians, and a wide variety of dinosaurs. Vertebrates are most commonly found in the lower, and therefore older, part of the formation.

In addition to Taurovenator, the theropods of the Huincul Formation are represented by the other giant carcharodontosaurids Meraxes and Mapusaurus, abelisaurids including Skorpiovenator, Ilokelesia, and Tralkasaurus, noasaurids such as Huinculsaurus, paravians such as Overoraptor, and other theropods such as Aoniraptor and Gualicho have also been discovered there. Several iguanodonts are also present in the Huincul Formation. The sauropods of the Huincul Formation are represented by the titanosaurs Argentinosaurus and Choconsaurus, and several rebbachisaurids including Cathartesaura, Limaysaurus, and some unnamed species.

== See also ==
- 2016 in paleontology
