= Eocarcharia =

Eocarcharia Temporal range: Early Cretaceous (Aptian–Albian), ~112 Ma
- Reconstructed skulls illustrating the chimaeric Eocarcharia hypodigm

Scientific classification
- Kingdom: Animalia
- Phylum: Chordata
- Class: Reptilia
- Clade: Dinosauria
- Clade: Saurischia
- Clade: Theropoda
- Family: †Spinosauridae (?)
- Subfamily: †Baryonychinae (?)
- Genus: †Eocarcharia; Sereno & Brusatte, 2008
- Species: †E. dinops

Binomial name
- †Eocarcharia dinops Sereno and Brusatte, 2008

Extinct genus of theropod dinosaurs

Eocarcharia (lit. 'dawn shark') is an extinct genus of theropod dinosaurs found in what is now the western Ténéré Desert of Niger. It is known from several skull bones collected in 2000 by an expedition to the Early Cretaceous (Aptian–Albian ages) Elrhaz Formation (Gadoufaoua locality) led by American paleontologist Paul Sereno. The fossil material was then described in 2008 by Sereno and Steve Brusatte. The genus contains a single species, Eocarcharia dinops. While Sereno and Brusatte identified all of the remains as belonging to a new carcharodontosaurid, later studies suggested that the species is chimaeric, comprising bones of at least two unrelated taxa. Some of the Eocarcharia material, including the holotype (name-bearing) specimen, likely belongs to a baryonychine spinosaurid. This would render Eocarcharia a member of this group, closely related to the coeval Suchomimus. Meanwhile, the definitively carcharodontosaurid bones, a maxilla and teeth, belong to a distinct unnamed taxon.

Little is known about Eocarcharia due to its fragmentary and chimaeric nature. When considered a carcharodontosaurid, it was estimated to be 6–8 metres (20–26 ft) long, making it smaller than derived carcharodontosaurids like Giganotosaurus, and Carcharodontosaurus. The postorbital (bone behind the orbit) is robust with a large brow, a distinct characteristic of Eocarcharia. It was possibly covered in keratin and used for head-butting with other individuals of its species. Eocarcharia lived in an environment with rivers and vast floodplains alongside many other dinosaurs, pterosaurs, crocodylomorphs, and freshwater animals.

== Discovery and naming ==
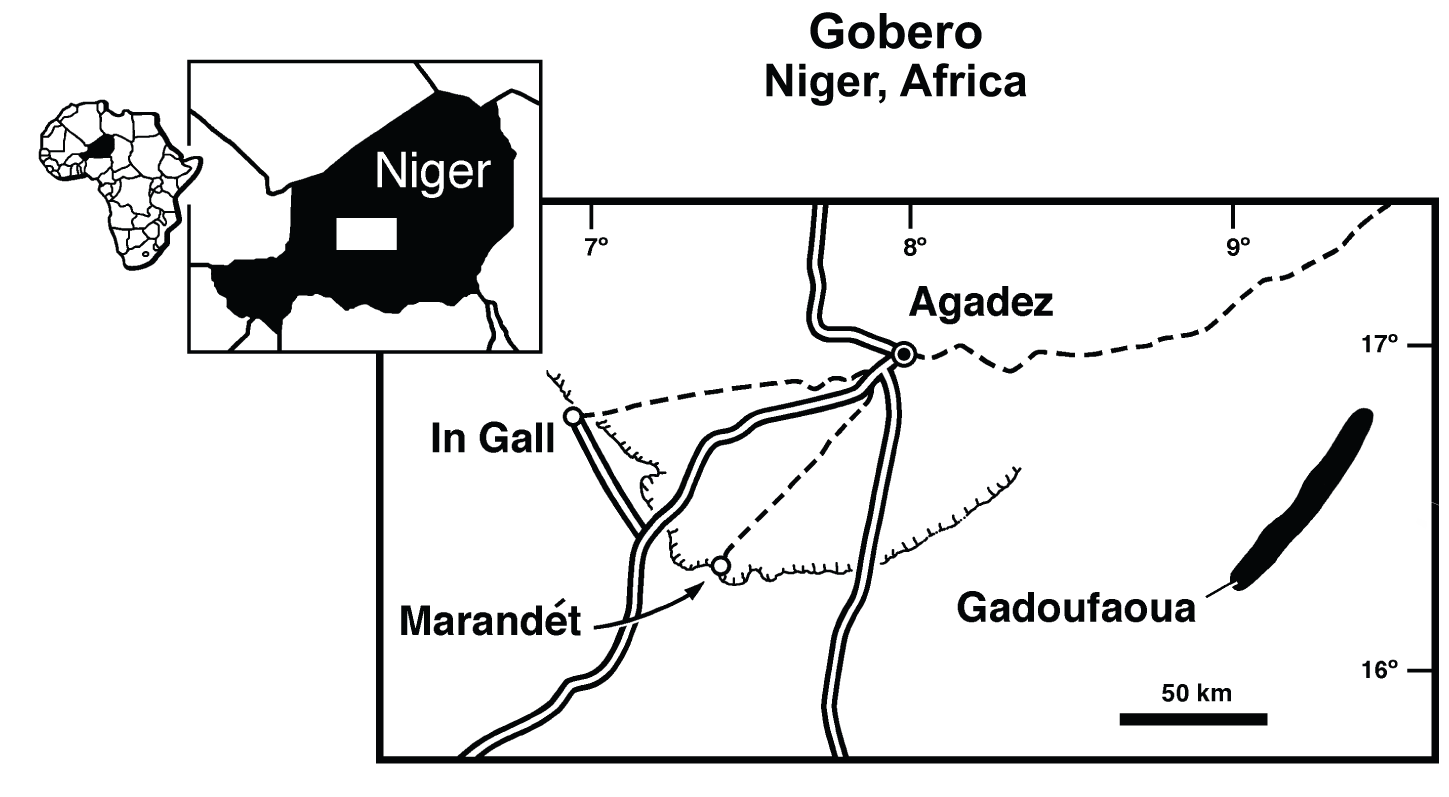
Location of the Gadoufaoua locality in Niger

In 2000, American paleontologist Paul Sereno led an expedition conducted with the University of Chicago and funded by the National Geographic Society. The purpose of this trip was to explore fossiliferous sandstone outcrops in a site on the western edge of the Nigerian Ténéré Desert known as Gadoufaoua. These rock layers belong to the Elrhaz Formation, dating to the Early Cretaceous. During the expedition, several isolated theropod skull bones were collected, including a maxilla (main tooth-bearing bone of the upper jaw) and two maxilla fragments, five postorbitals (bone behind the orbit), two frontals—one articulated with the left prefrontal and one with a partial parietal (skull roof bones)—and five teeth. These remains were then transported to the University of Chicago for preparation and study before being returned to the Musee National du Niger and deposited under the catalog numbers MNN GAD2–14.

In 2008, Sereno and Steve Brusatte described all of these remains as belonging to a new genus and species of carcharodontosaurid dinosaur, named Eocarcharia dinops. They established one of the postorbitals, MNN-GAD2, as the holotype (name-bearing) specimen. The generic name, Eocarcharia, derives from the Ancient Greek words eos, meaning 'dawn', and karcharias, meaning 'shark', referencing the early-diverging nature of Eocarcharia in relation to its 'shark-toothed' relatives. The specific name, dinops, is a Greek term meaning 'fierce-eyed', referring to the unique postorbital ornamentation above the eye.

== Description ==
Size of the spinosaurid (left) and carcharodontosaurid (right) Eocarcharia specimens compared to a human

Based on the total fusion of the skull bones referred to Eocarcharia, Sereno & Brusatte identified them as having come from fully mature adult individuals. Referencing the more complete skulls and skeletons of other carcharodontosaurids like Acrocanthosaurus and Carcharodontosaurus, they determined that Eocarcharia was likely about 6–8 metres (20–26 ft) long, half the linear size of the largest, more derived members of the family. Similar estimates were supported by later publications.

=== Posterior skull ===
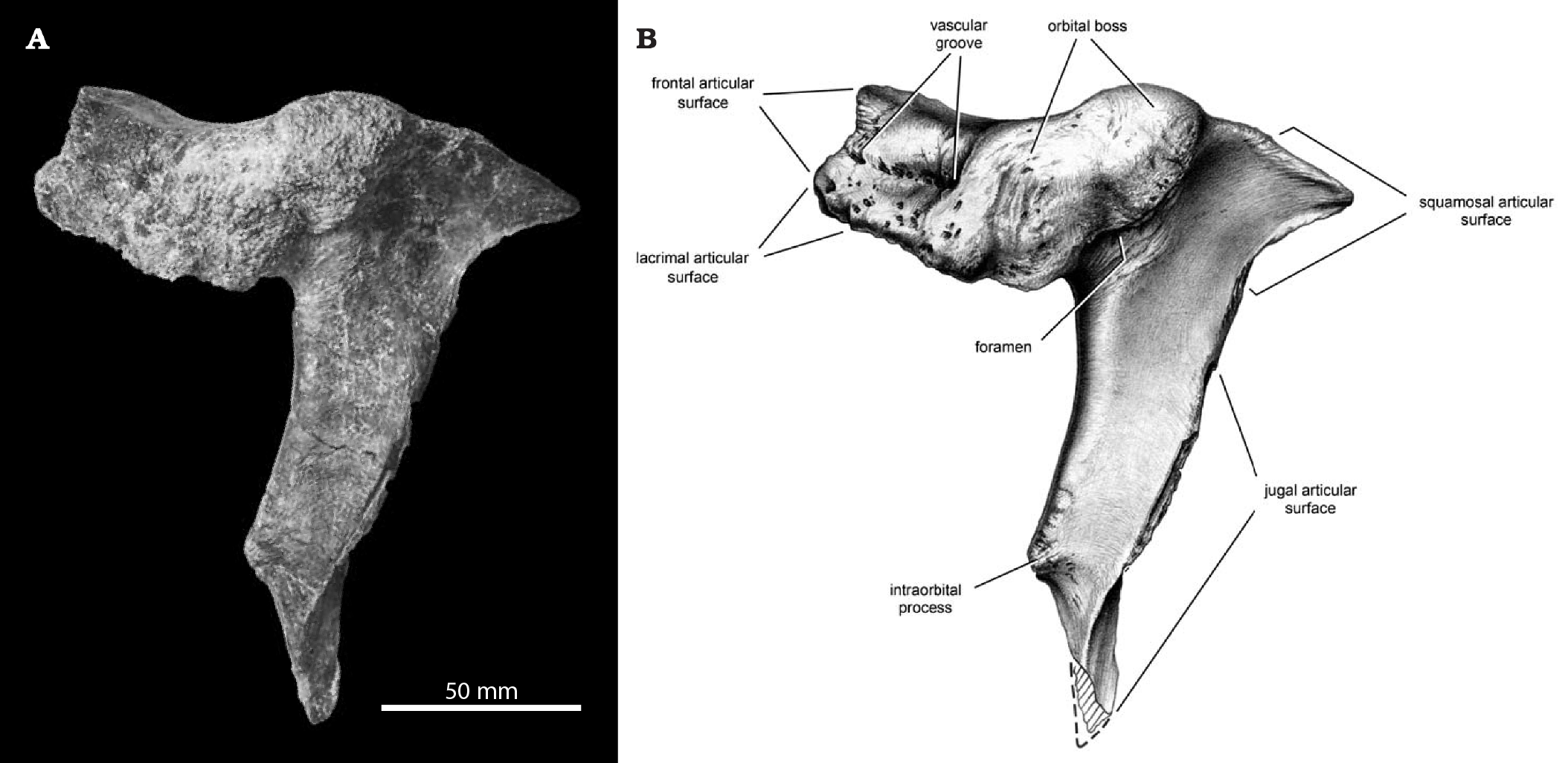
Photograph and annotated line drawing of the holotype postorbital

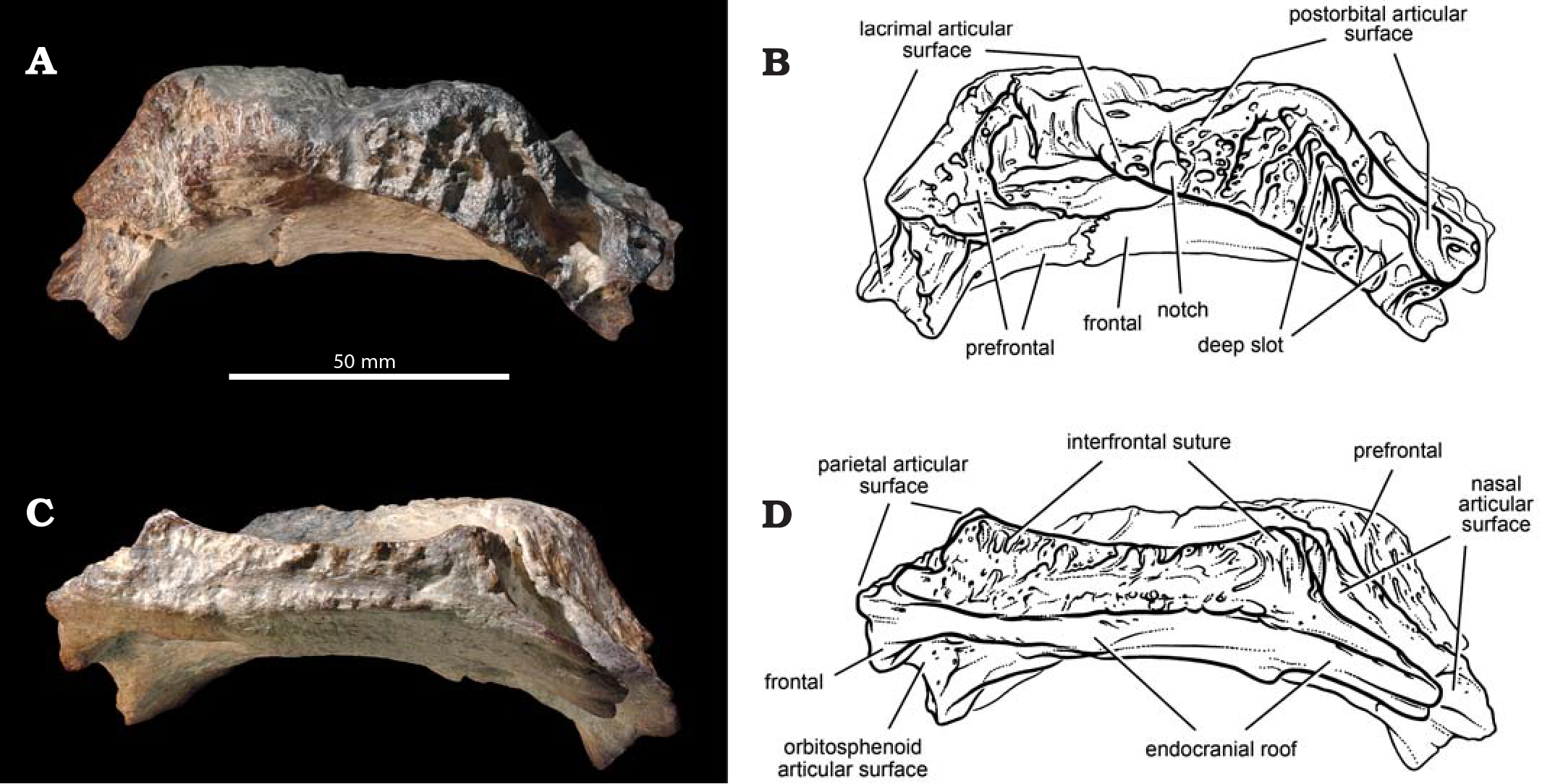
Photograph and line drawing of the referred skull roof in lateral and medial views

The postorbital bears a thick, robust brow that, likely due to its robustness, is well-preserved in multiple specimens. This brow is composed of two segments: an anterior (front) portion with boxy dimensions and a posterior (back) portion that forms an ovate orbital boss (large, thick bony mass). This orbital boss is positioned above the posterodorsal (top back) edge of the orbit, a trait noted by Sereno and Brusatte to be diagnostic (unique) to this species. However, exaggerated orbital bosses are also found in spinosaurids. Mapusaurus and Giganotosaurus have orbital bosses as well, though these are ossified as a distinct body from the rest of the postorbital. In contrast, the postorbital bosses of Carcharodontosaurus and Eocarcharia lack the extensive ossification seen in Mapusaurus and Giganotosaurus.

The margins of the postorbital make up segments of the orbit edges, the laterotemporal fenestra, and the supratemporal fenestra. Several of the postorbitals known from Eocarcharia preserve the articular surfaces for the lacrimal, which are 9 millimetres (0.35 in) deep and 12 millimetres (0.47 in) long. These articular surfaces are very small and deep proportionally for a carcharodontosaurid, making this characteristic a diagnostic trait of Eocarcharia. In contrast, the point of contact between the postorbital and the frontal is rugose and bears a unique, plate-shaped process (projection of bone) that interlocks with a concavity on the frontal. Another diagnostic trait of Eocarcharia is that its postorbital bears a narrow facet which articulates laterally with the jugal (cheekbone), whereas carcharodontosaurids like Carcharodontosaurus have broader facets. Midshafts of the ventral (bottom) ramus (a branch of bone) of the postorbital in spinosaurids and megalosaurids are typically U-shaped in cross-section, whereas in Eocarcharia it is subtriangular in cross-section. An infraorbital process is also present on the postorbital ventral ramus of Eocarcharia, distinct from those of other carcharodontosaurids in that it is small, rugose, and distally-positioned (away from the body core).

The frontal is known from Eocarcharia, and is proportionally very broad at its mid-length, similar to that of Carcharodontosaurus. In dorsal view, the supratemporal fossa (a depression along the temporal fenestra) is greatly exposed, another diagnostic characteristic. In ventral view, the anterior portion of the frontal is exposed, forming the roof of the olfactory section of the endocranium (the part of the skull that holds the brain). This portion of the frontal is narrow, in contrast to those of tetanurans, where it is typically broad. Notably, a prefrontal is also preserved. Independent prefrontals are absent in advanced carcharodontosaurids as they are typically co-ossified (fused) with the lacrimals into a single element, whereas in earlier genera like Eocarcharia, Acrocanthosaurus, and Concavenator, they are unfused. In Eocarcharia, the prefrontal is relatively wide, about half the width of the frontal. The prefrontal bears an extended process that articulates with the deep, squared articular notch on the frontal. On the ventral (bottom) side of the frontal, theropods typically feature an extended process that travels along the posteromedial (back inner) portion of the bone. Eocarcharia lacks this process.

=== Referred maxilla and teeth ===
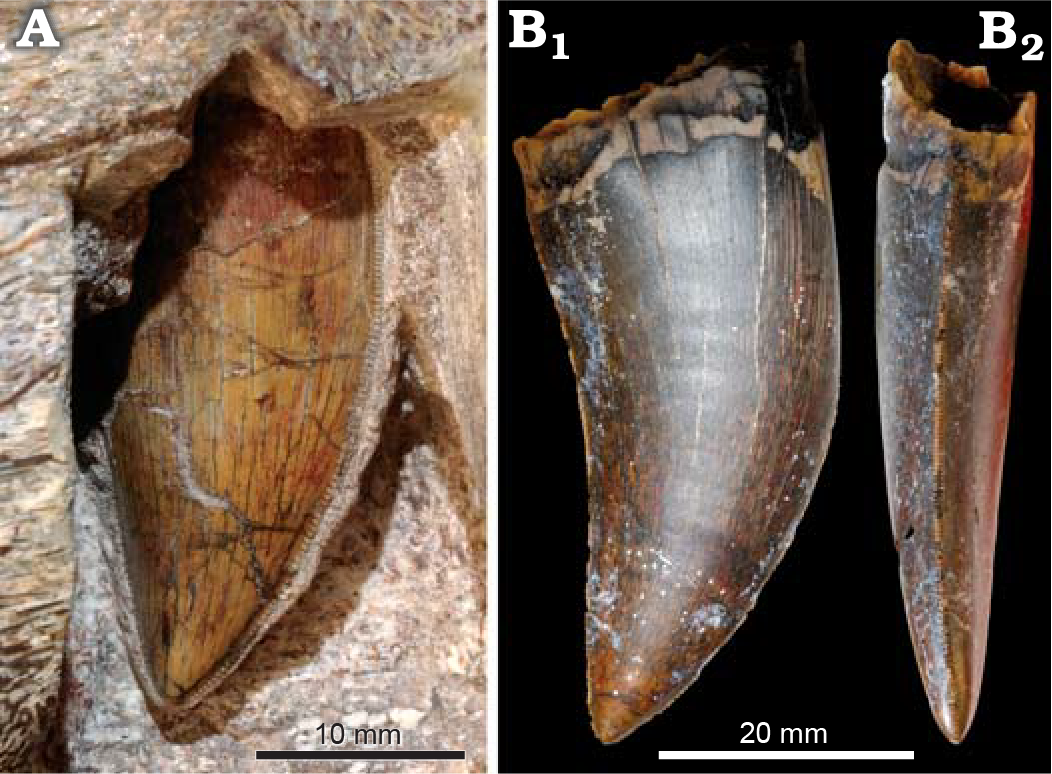
Carcharodontosaurid teeth referred to Eocarcharia

One nearly complete maxilla and two central portions of the maxilla were initially referred to Eocarcharia and definitively belong to a carcharodontosaurid or closely allied taxon. The dentary has 15 alveoli (tooth sockets). It is generally flat, which would have given this taxon a relatively narrow snout. Neurovascular foramina (small pits and grooves) cover the external surface. The antorbital fossa, a depression on the side of the maxilla, is pierced by three fenestrae (holes), the largest of which is the subtriangular promaxillary fenestra, followed by the maxillary fenestra, which is subequal in size. A smaller round accessory fenestra is present above these two. Most of the alveoli in the complete maxilla preserve replacement teeth. The tooth crowns are transversely compressed. Unlike many carcharodontosaurid teeth, those referred to Eocarcharia are not blade-shaped and they lack straight posterior carina (cutting edges on the back of the crown) and enamel wrinkles with high relief.

== Classification ==
The phylogenetic position of Eocarcharia is complicated by the probable chimaeric nature of the specimens referred to it. All of the material was initially recognized as belonging to the same species, specifically an early-diverging carcharodontosaurid. While the maxilla and teeth clearly belong to a carcharodontosaurid or similar taxon, later research has suggested the holotype and skull roof may belong to an unrelated theropod, specifically a spinosaurid closely related to Suchomimus.

=== As a carcharodontosaurid ===
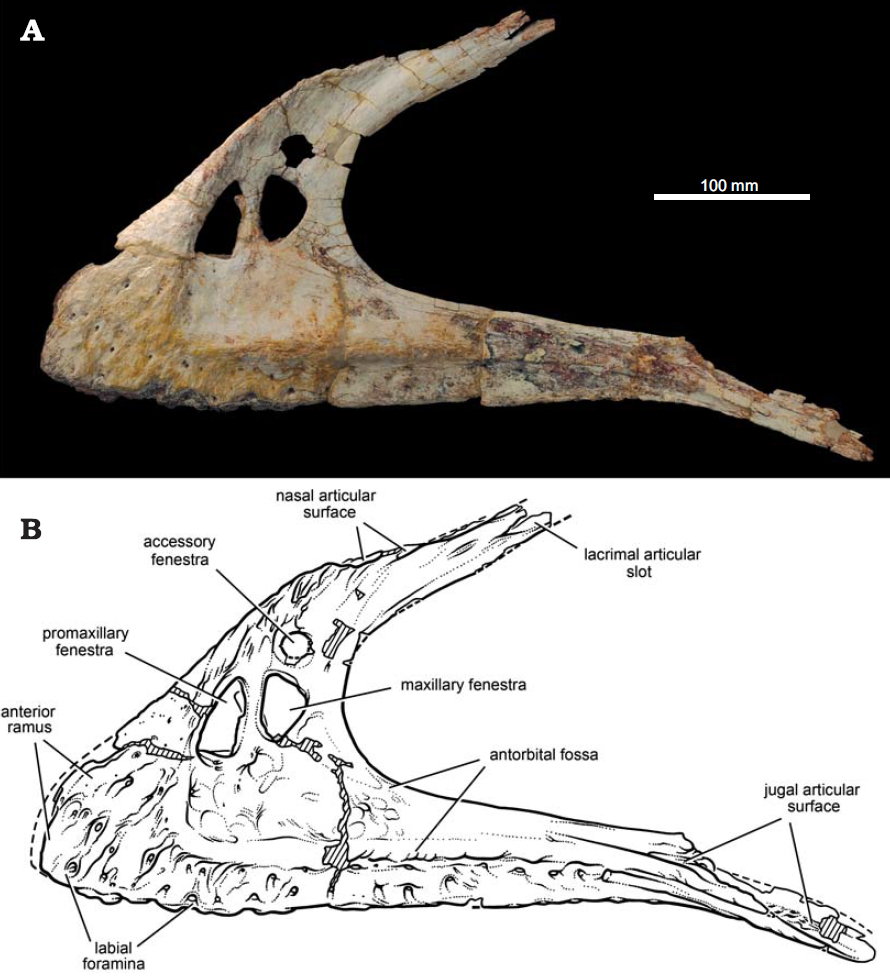
Carcharodontosaurid maxilla referred to Eocarcharia

In their phylogenetic analyses—modified from a dataset published by the same authors later that year—Sereno & Brusatte (2008) recognized Eocarcharia as an allosauroid theropod in an early-diverging position within the family Carcharodontosauridae. They noted that the resolution of their trees was more stable without Eocarcharia, since it could not be scored for most of the characters in their dataset. Regardless, their strict consensus tree recovered it as the sister taxon to the North American Acrocanthosaurus.

In the same 2008 paper, Sereno and Brusatte named Kryptops palaios based on an abelisaurid maxilla and postcranial remains. They assigned the postcranial material to the same individual as the maxilla based on their close association and alleged basal abelisaurid features in the vertebrae and pelvis. In 2012, Matthew Carrano and colleagues considered Kryptops palaios to be a chimera (specimen composed of multiple species), stating that its postcranial remains, especially the pelvis and sacrum, may belong to a carcharodontosaurid, possibly Eocarcharia. Since these bones do not overlap with the Eocarcharia holotype, they could not be definitively referred to this taxon. The hypothesis that these postcranial bones do not belong to Kryptops was supported by later studies, which agreed that the remains belonged to a carcharodontosaurid or a metriacanthosaurid.

In their 2024 description of a new specimen of the giant carcharodontosaurid Taurovenator, Rolando and colleagues included Eocarcharia in their phylogenetic analysis, recovering it as an early-diverging member of the clade, branching after Neovenator. These results are displayed in the cladogram below:

- Carcharodontosauridae
  - Neovenator
  - - Eocarcharia
    - - Lajasvenator
      - Acrocanthosaurus
      - Carcharodontosaurinae
        - Lusovenator
        - Shaochilong
        - Carcharodontosaurus saharicus
        - Carcharodontosaurus iguidensis
        - Giganotosaurini
          - Tyrannotitan
          - - Giganotosaurus
            - - Mapusaurus
              - - Meraxes
                - Taurovenator

The skull bones of Eocarcharia belong to multiple individuals and were found in different sites. As such, the taxonomic identity of these bones—and whether or not they can all be referred to the same taxon—has been debated. In their description of the carcharodontosaurid Tameryraptor, Kellermann, Cuesta & Rauhut (2025) scored the holotype postorbital (including a referred frontal with articular surfaces that match those of the postorbital) and referred maxilla as separate operational taxonomic units (OTUs) to test the likelihood that they belonged to the same taxon. In their analyses, both OTUs were consistently recovered in different positions, supporting their status as distinct taxa. The maxilla was reliably recovered as a carcharodontosauriform, either as a non-carcharodontosaurine carcharodontosaurid or as a metriacanthosaurid. On the other hand, the holotype was recovered in positions as a basal carcharodontosaur, or variably inside or outside of Carcharodontosauriformes. They interpreted these results as indicative of the referred maxilla skewing past analyses toward carcharodontosaur affinities for the taxon.

=== As a spinosaurid ===
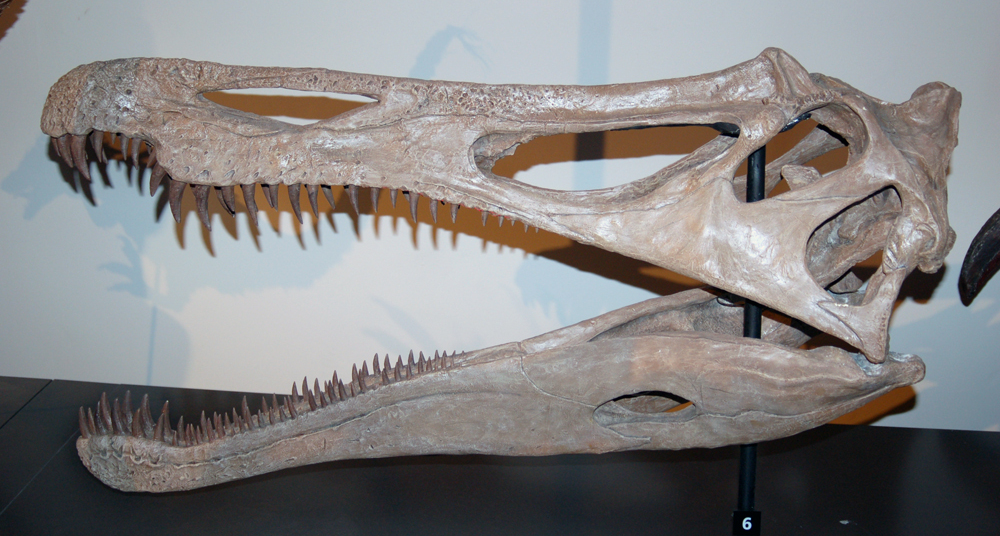
Reconstructed skull of the spinosaurid Suchomimus, a possible close relative of Eocarcharia

In 2024, Andrea Cau published the results of a comprehensive theropod phylogenetic framework. The following year, Cau and Alessandro Paterna used an updated version of this dataset to analyze the relationships of Cretaceous theropods from Africa, especially those known from multiple specimens with minimal overlapping material. The researchers scored two separate OTUs for Eocarcharia: one for the referred maxilla and another comprising the skull roof material (including the holotype postorbital and referred frontal and prefrontal). As expected, the maxilla OTU was found to have close affinities with early-diverging carcharodontosaurids. More surprisingly, the holotype + skull roof OTU was recovered as the sister taxon to the coeval Suchomimus as a baryonychine within the Spinosauridae. These results were supported by the presence of at least seven traits shared by Eocarcharia and spinosaurids that are absent in carcharodontosaurs. Cau and Paterna further recognized that two of the autapomorphies (unique derived traits) proposed for Eocarcharia by Sereno and Brusatte are also uniquely shared with Ceratosuchops, a baryonychine from the Wessex Formation of the United Kingdom. Furthermore, the prefrontal bone has a feature seen in Baryonyx but not allosauroids. Given the discrepancies with the placement of Eocarcharia as a carcharodontosaur and the many similarities to Suchomimus, Ceratosuchops, and Riparovenator, the researchers considered the genus to be most parsimoniously regarded as a spinosaurid.

Cau and Paterna's phylogenetic results placed Eocarcharia as the sister taxon to Suchomimus. Both species differ in fourteen characters, precluding their taxonomic synonymization. This also provides further evidence for an observed trend of at least two spinosaurids coexisting in one ecosystem (e.g., Ceratosuchops and Riparovenator in the Wessex Formation). Since the maxilla OTU was recovered as distinct from the holotype + skull roof OTU, Cau and Paterna suggested that this bone—which demonstrates apparent allosauroid anatomy consistent with carcharodontosaurids—should be referred to a new taxon. Abbreviated results of their phylogenetic analysis are displayed in the cladogram below, with both Eocarchia OTUs indicated: the skull roof and holotype within the spinosaurid clade Ceratosuchopsini and the maxilla as a basal carcharodontosaurid. ⊞ buttons can be clicked to expand nodes.

- Carnosauria
  - Megalosauroidea phylogenetic position of Eocarcharia (holotype + skull roof)
    ⊞
    - - Poekilopleuron
      - Piatnitzkysaurus
      - Marshosaurus
      - Condorraptor
    - - Afrovenator
      - - - - Torvosaurus tanneri
            - Megalosaurus
          - - Magnosaurus
            - Duriavenator
        - - Wiehenvenator
          - Vallibonavenatrix
          - Leshansaurus
          - Spinosauridae
            - - Ichthyovenator
              - - Sigilmassasaurus
                - Spinosaurus (holotype)
                - "Spinosaurus B"
                - Spinosaurus (Kem Kem morph)
            - Baryonychinae
              - Baryonyx
              - Ceratosuchopsini
                - - Suchomimus
                  - Eocarcharia
                    (holotype + skull roof)
                - - Riparovenator
                  - Ceratosuchops
    ⊟
  - Allosauroidea phylogenetic position of the referred "Eocarcharia" maxilla
    ⊞
    - Asfaltovenator
    - - Monolophosaurus
      - - Metriacanthosauridae
        - - Lourinhanosaurus
          - - Allosaurus
            - - - Taurovenator (holotype)
                - Siamraptor
                - Piveteausaurus
                - Concavenator
              - - Neovenator
                - Carcharodontosauridae
                  - Eocarcharia
                    (referred maxilla)
                  - - - Veterupristisaurus
                      - Lusovenator
                      - Lajasvenator
                      - Acrocanthosaurus
                    - - Other carcharodontosaurids ⟹
    ⊟

Notably, spinosaurid similarities have been noted before Cau and Paterna's 2025 analysis; in 2022, Sereno and colleagues reported a newly-discovered skull roof specimen they assigned to Suchomimus. The similarity of this specimen to the postorbital and frontal of Eocarcharia was noted by Schade and colleagues the following year. In early 2025, Kellermann, Cuesta & Rauhut reinforced this comparison, claiming that the Suchomimus specimen may even belong to Eocarcharia. Cau and Paterna acknowledged these similarities, but noted characters more consistent with Suchomimus than Eocarcharia. They also commented on the possibility that some of the other specimens traditionally referred to Suchomimus may actually belong to Eocarcharia.

== Paleobiology ==
Due to the fragmentary, chimaeric, and indeterminate nature of the fossils of Eocarcharia, little can be directly known about its paleobiology. In their 2008 description, Sereno and Brusatte noted the thickness and robustness of the postorbital bosses. The brow was likely covered in keratin, extending its size. It also displays large, intricate sutures between the postorbital and frontal that suggest it would be stable against lateral impacts. The head of the laterosphenoid is placed in a socket in the postorbital, which, although shallower than that of advanced carcharodontosaurids, would be able to handle stress. This combination of stress adaptations illustrates that the brow was for more than purely display purposes. This led the authors to hypothesize that the postorbital brows of Eocarcharia and carcharodontosaurids were used for intraspecific lateral head-butting. While this brow is absent in allosauroids and most spinosaurids, the spinosaurids Ceratosuchops and Riparovenator do preserve large orbital bosses comparable to those in Eocarcharia. Although present as general expansions in large tyrannosaurids, the postorbital bosses of Eocarcharia and carcharodontosaurids project laterally, further suggesting that they played a role in lateral head-butting.

== Paleoecology ==
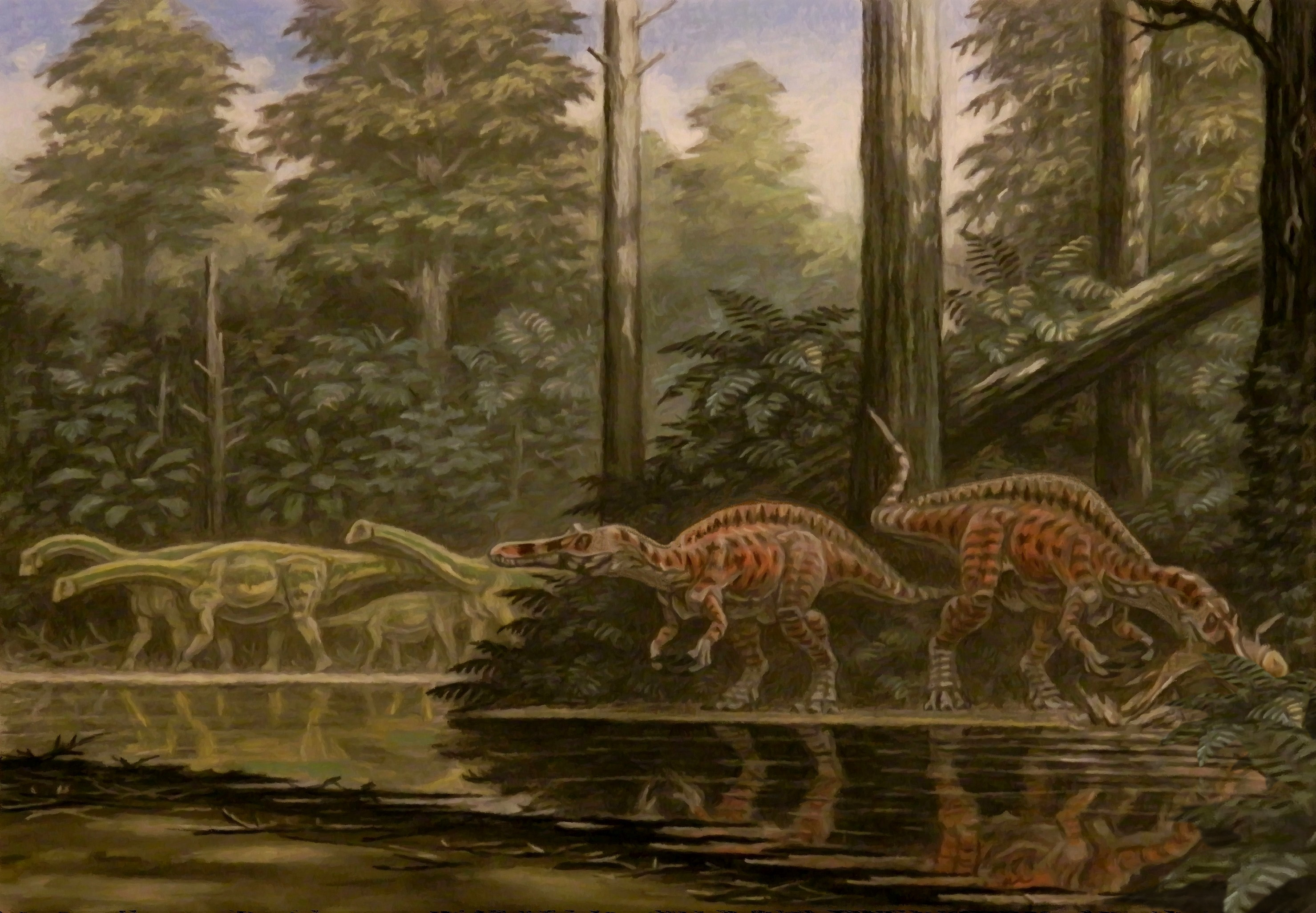
Restoration of Suchomimus (foreground) and Nigersaurus (background) in the Elrhaz Formation environment

Eocarcharia is known from the Elrhaz Formation of the Tegama Group in an area of the Nigerian Ténéré Desert called Gadoufaoua. The Elrhaz Formation consists mainly of fluvial sandstones with low relief, much of which is obscured by sand dunes. The sediments are coarse- to medium-grained, with almost no fine-grained horizons. Eocarcharia lived about 120 to 112 million years ago, during the Aptian to Albian ages of the mid-Cretaceous. It likely lived in habitats dominated by inland floodplains (a riparian zone).

Eocarcharia lived alongside several other dinosaurs. These included other theropods, such as the spinosaurid and probable close relative Suchomimus, Kryptops (known from a chimaeric combination of abelisaurid and allosauroid material), and the putative noasaurid Afromimus. Several megaherbivores, including the hadrosauriforms Ouranosaurus and Lurdusaurus, the dryosaurid Elrhazosaurus, and two sauropods, the rebbachisaurid Nigersaurus and an unnamed titanosaur, have been unearthed from Gadoufaoua. Together, these comprise one of the few associations of megaherbivores with a balance of sauropods and large ornithopods. Crocodylomorphs including Anatosuchus, Araripesuchus, Sarcosuchus, and Stolokrosuchus were also found in these rock layers. In addition, remains of an unnamed ornithocheirid pterosaur, turtles, bony fish, a hybodont (shark-like fish), and bivalves have been found. The aquatic fauna consists entirely of freshwater inhabitants.

== See also ==
- Kryptops
- 2008 in paleontology
