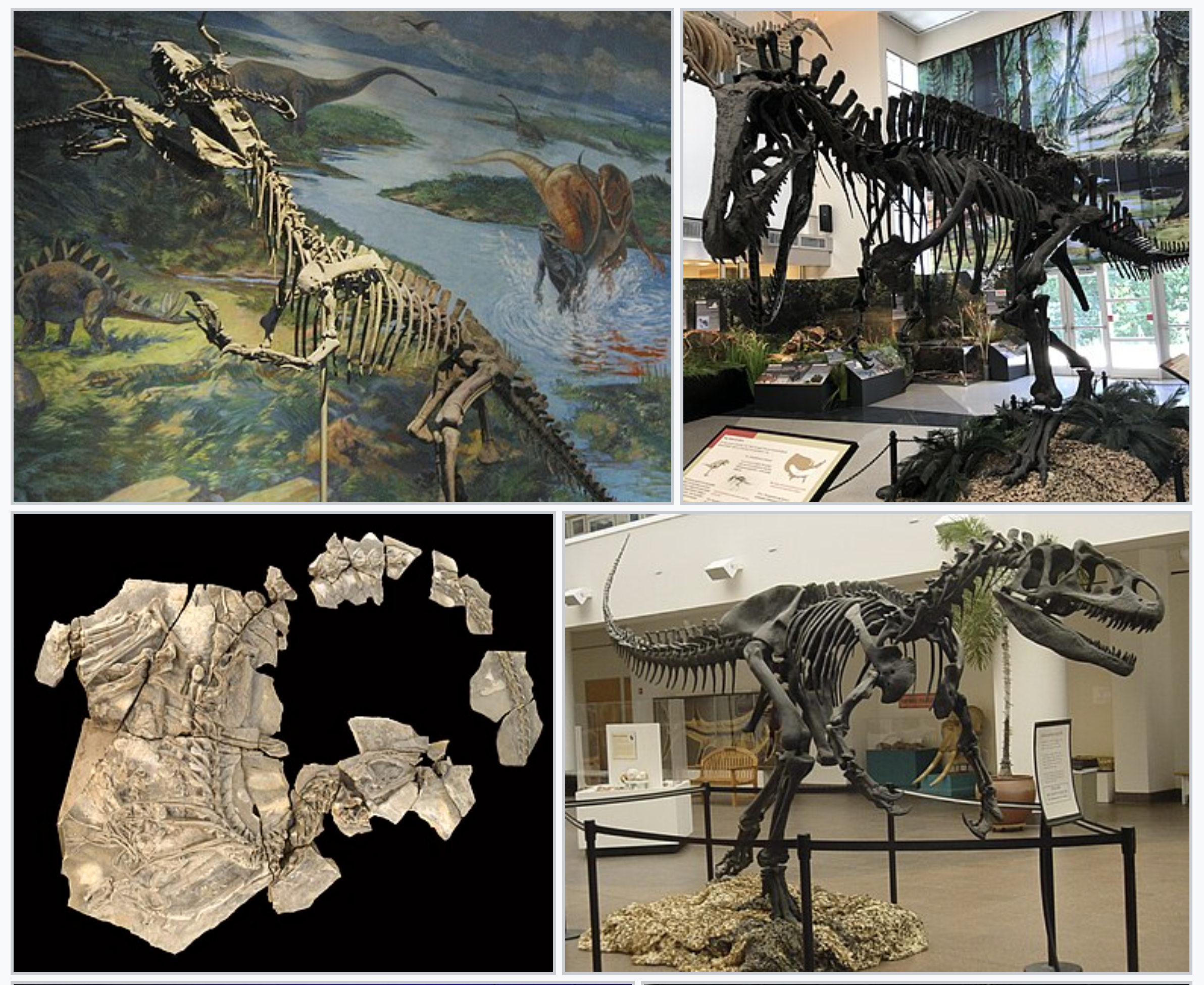
- Four carnosaurs (top to bottom): Sinraptor, Acrocanthosaurus, Concavenator, Allosaurus

Scientific classification
- Kingdom: Animalia
- Phylum: Chordata
- Class: Reptilia
- Clade: Dinosauria
- Clade: Saurischia
- Clade: Theropoda
- Clade: Avetheropoda
- Clade: †Carnosauria von Huene, 1920

Subgroups
- †Altispinax?
- †Gasosaurus?
- †Monolophosaurus?
- †Poekilopleuron?
- †Megalosauroidea? (possibly paraphyletic)
- †Allosauroidea Marsh, 1878
  - †Asfaltovenator
  - †Eocarcharia?
  - †Erectopus
  - †Lourinhanosaurus?
  - †Siamotyrannus?
  - †Xuanhanosaurus?
  - †Allosauridae
  - †Metriacanthosauridae
  - †Piatnitzkysauridae?
  - †Carcharodontosauria Benson, Carrano and Brusatte, 2010
    - †Datanglong?
    - †Concavenator?
    - †Kelmayisaurus?
    - †Lusovenator
    - †Neovenator
    - †Siamraptor
    - †Carcharodontosauridae
Uncertain or possible members
- †Aorun
- †Bahariasaurus
- †Chilantaisaurus
- †Compsognathus
- †Deltadromeus
- †Gualicho
- †Juravenator
- †Labocania
- †Nedcolbertia
- †Scipionyx
- †Sciurumimus
- †Siats
- †Wakinosaurus

Synonyms
- Allosauroidea? Marsh, 1878

= Carnosauria =

Carnosaurs Temporal range: Middle Jurassic – Late Cretaceous, 174–90 Ma Possible Toarcian records.

Extinct group of theropod dinosaurs

Carnosauria is an extinct group of carnivorous theropod dinosaurs that lived during the Jurassic and Cretaceous periods.

While Carnosauria was historically considered largely synonymous with Allosauroidea, some recent studies have revived Carnosauria as clade including both Allosauroidea and Megalosauroidea (which is sometimes recovered as paraphyletic with respect to Allosauroidea), and thus including the majority of non-coelurosaurian members of theropod clade Tetanurae. Other researchers have found Allosauroidea and Megalosauroidea to be unrelated groups.

Distinctive characteristics of carnosaurs include large eye sockets, a long narrow skull and modifications of the legs and pelvis such as the thigh (femur) being longer than the shin (tibia).

Carnosaurs first appeared in the Middle Jurassic around 174 million years ago, and the last definitive carnosaur family Carcharodontosauridae became extinct in the Turonian epoch of the Late Cretaceous around 90 million years ago. Some theropod remains, once suggested to be putative carcharodontosaurids from the Maastrichtian epoch (72–66 mya) in South America, were later reinterpreted as those of other theropod groups including the abelisaurids and maniraptorans.

== History of study ==
Carnosauria has traditionally been used as a dumping ground for all large theropods. Even non-dinosaurs, such as the rauisuchian Teratosaurus, were once considered carnosaurs. However, analysis in the 1980s and 1990s revealed that other than size, the group shared very few characteristics, making it polyphyletic. Most former carnosaurs (such as the megalosaurids, the spinosaurids, and the ceratosaurs) were reclassified as more primitive theropods. Others (such as the tyrannosaurids) that were more closely related to birds were placed in Coelurosauria. Modern cladistic analysis defines Carnosauria as those tetanurans sharing a more recent common ancestor with Allosaurus than with modern birds.

== Anatomy ==
Size comparison of seven carnosaurs

Carnosaurs share certain distinctive features, one of which is a triangular-shaped pubic boot. They also have 3 fingers per hand, with the second and third digit being approximately equal in length. The femur is larger than the tibia. Another defining feature of carnosaurs is that the chevron bases on their tails have anterior and posterior bone growth. The largest carnosaurs can reach up to 10 meters in length. The length of the body from the tail to the hip is between 54% and 62% of the total body length, and the length of the body from the head to the hip is between 38% and 46% of the total body length. Carnosaurs scaled their limbs relative to their body in a way similar to how other large theropods, like the tyrannosaurids, did. During the Cretaceous, some carnosaurs grew to sizes similar to those of the largest tyrannosaurids. These large carnosaurs lived in the same time period as the other large theropods found in the upper Morrison and Tendaguru formations.

Carnosaurs maintained a similar center of mass across all sizes, which is found to be between 37% and 58% of the femoral length anterior to the hip. Other similarities across all carnosaurs include the structure of their hind limb and pelvis. The pelvis in particular is thought to be designed to reduce stress regardless of body size. In particular, the way the femur is inclined reduces the bending and torsion stress. Furthermore, like other animals with tails, carnosaurs possess a caudofemoralis longus (CFL) muscle that allowed them to flex theirs. Larger carnosaurs are found to have a lower CFL muscle-to-body-mass proportion that smaller carnosaurs.

In addition to body similarities, most carnosaurs, especially most allosauroids are also united by certain skull features. Some of the defining ones include a smaller mandibular fenestra, a short quadrate bone, and a short connection between the braincase and the palate. Allosauroid skulls are about 2.5 to 3 times longer as they are tall. Their narrow skull along with their serrated teeth allow carnosaurs to better slice flesh off of their prey. Carnosaur teeth are flat and have equally-sized denticles on both edges. The flat side of the tooth face the sides of the skull, while the edges align on the same plane as the skull. From analyzing the skull of different carnosaurs, the volume of the cranial vault ranges between 95 milliliters in Sinraptor to 250 milliliters in Giganotosaurus.

Allosaurus and Concavenator preserve skin impressions showing their integument. In Allosaurus, skin impressions showing small scales measuring 1 to 3 millimeters are known from the side of the torso and the mandible. Another skin impression from the ventral side of the neck preserves broad scutate scales. An impression from the base of the tail preserves larger scales around 2 centimeters in diameter. However, it has been noted that these may be sauropod scales due to their similarity and the fact that non-theropod remains were discovered associated with the tail of this particular Allosaurus specimen. Concavenator preserves rectangular scutate scales on the underside of the tail, as well as scutate scales on top of the feet along with small scales on the rest of the feet. A series of knobs on the ulna of Concavenator have been interpreted by some authors as quill knobs theorized to have supported primitive quills; however this interpretation has been questioned, and they have been suggested to represent traces of ligaments instead.

== Classification ==
Within Carnosauria, there is a slightly more exclusive clade, superfamily Allosauroidea. The clade Allosauroidea was originally named by Othniel Charles Marsh, but it was given a formal definition by Phil Currie and Zhao, and later used as a stem-based taxon by Paul Sereno in 1997. Sereno was the first to provide a stem-based definition for the Allosauroidea in 1998, defining the clade as "All neotetanurans closer to Allosaurus than to Neornithes." Kevin Padian used a node-based definition in his 2007 study which defined the Allosauroidea as Allosaurus, Sinraptor, their most recent common ancestor, and all of its descendants. Thomas R. Holtz and colleagues and Phil Currie and Ken Carpenter, among others, have followed this node-based definition. Depending on the study, Carnosauria and Allosauroidea are sometimes considered synonymous. In such cases, several researchers have elected to use Allosauroidea over Carnosauria.

=== Conventional phylogeny ===
The following cladogram illustrates the phylogenetic position of Allosauroidea within Theropoda. It is a simplified version of the tree presented in a synthesis of the relationships of the major theropod groups based on various studies conducted in the 2010s. The ⊞ button can be clicked to expand the clade and display the interrelationships of the four major allosauroid groups.

- Neotheropoda
  - Coelophysoidea
  - - Dilophosauridae
    - Averostra
      - Ceratosauria
      - Tetanurae
        - Megalosauroidea
        - Avetheropoda
          - Allosauroidea
            ⊞
            - Metriacanthosauridae
            - Allosauria
              - Allosauridae
              - Carcharodontosauria
                - Neovenator
                - Carcharodontosauridae
            ⊟
          - Coelurosauria
            - Tyrannosauroidea
            - - Compsognathidae
              - - Ornithomimosauria
                - Maniraptora

=== Alternative hypotheses ===
The composition of the clade Carnosauria has been controversial among scientists since at least 2010. Different clades have been recovered by different authors, and a scientific consensus has yet to emerge.

One such clade is Neovenatoridae, a proposed clade of carcharodontosaurian carnosaurs uniting some primitive members of the group such as Neovenator with the Megaraptora, a group of theropods with controversial affinities. Other studies recover megaraptorans as basal coelurosaurs unrelated to carcharodontosaurs. Other theropods with uncertain affinities such as Gualicho, Chilantaisaurus and Deltadromeus are also sometimes included.

Neovenatoridae, as formulated by these authors, contained Neovenator, Chilantaisaurus, and a newly named clade: Megaraptora. Megaraptora contained Megaraptor, Fukuiraptor, Orkoraptor, Aerosteon, and Australovenator. These genera were allied with the other neovenatorids on the basis of several features spread out throughout the skeleton, particularly the large amount of pneumatization present. The pneumatic ilium of Aerosteon was particularly notable, as Neovenator was the only other taxon known to have that trait at the time. Neovenatorids were envisioned as the latest-surviving allosauroids, which were able to persist well into the Late Cretaceous due to their low profile and coelurosaur-like adaptations. Later studies supported this hypothesis, such as Carrano, Benson & Sampson large study of tetanuran relationships in 2012, and Zanno & Makovicky description of the newly discovered theropod Siats in 2013, which they placed within Megaraptora. Fukuiraptor and Australovenator were consistently found to be close relatives of each other; this was also the case for Aerosteon and Megaraptor. Orkoraptor was a "wildcard" taxon difficult to place with certainty.

Phylogenetic studies conducted by Benson, Carrano and Brusatte (2010) and Carrano, Benson and Sampson (2012) recovered the group Megaraptora and a few other taxa as members of the Neovenatoridae. This would make neovenatorids the latest-surviving allosauroids; at least one megaraptoran, Orkoraptor, lived near the end of the Mesozoic era, dating to the early Maastrichtian stage of the latest Cretaceous period, about 70 million years ago.

The cladogram below follows a 2016 analysis by Sebastián Apesteguía, Nathan D. Smith, Rubén Juarez Valieri, and Peter J. Makovicky based on the dataset of Carrano et al. (2012).

- Allosauroidea
  - Metriacanthosauridae
  - Allosauria
    - Allosauridae
    - Carcharodontosauria
      - Carcharodontosauridae
      - Neovenatoridae
        - - Deltadromeus
          - Gualicho
        - - Neovenator
          - - Chilantaisaurus
            - Megaraptora

Subsequent analyses have contradicted the above hypothesis. Novas and colleagues conducted an analysis in 2012 which found that Neovenator was closely related to carcharodontosaurids, simultaneously found Megaraptor and related genera to be coelurosaurs closely related to tyrannosaurids. However, Novas et al. subsequently found that megaraptorans lacked most of the key features in the hands of derived coelurosaurs including Guanlong and Deinonychus. Instead, their hands retain a number of primitive characteristics seen in basal tetanurans such as Allosaurus. Nevertheless, there are still a number of other traits that support megaraptorans as members of the Coelurosauria. Other taxa like Deltadromeus and Gualicho have been alternatively recovered as coelurosaurs or noasaurid ceratosaurs. Over the recent years, a majority of researchers have increasingly classified megaraptorans as coelurosaurs.

Several recent analyses do not find a relationship between Neovenator and megaraptorans, which suggests that the latter were not carnosaurs or allosauroids. As a result of these findings, and the fact that Neovenator itself is the only uncontroversial neovenatorid, the family Neovenatoridae sees little use in recent publications.

In 2019, Rauhut and Pol described Asfaltovenator vialidadi, a basal allosauroid displaying a mosaic of primitive and derived features seen within Tetanurae. Their phylogenetic analysis found traditional Megalosauroidea to represent a basal grade of carnosaurs, paraphyletic with respect to Allosauroidea. Because the authors amended the definition of Allosauroidea to include all theropods that are closer to Allosaurus fragilis than to either Megalosaurus bucklandii or Neornithes, the Piatnitzkysauridae was found to fall within Allosauroidea. A cladogram displaying the relationships they recovered is shown below.

- Carnosauria
  - Monolophosaurus
  - - Spinosauridae
    - - Megalosauridae
      - Allosauroidea
        - Xuanhanosaurus
        - - Piatnitzkysauridae
          - - Asfaltovenator
            - - Metriacanthosauridae
              - - Allosauridae
                - Carcharodontosauria

In 2025, photos of a destroyed specimen of Carcharodontosaurus were re-examined by Maximilian Kellermann and colleagues and were used to erect the new genus Tameryraptor. A byproduct of this study was the recovery of a novel phylogenetic arrangement of carnosaurs. They did not recover megalosauroids as close relatives of allosauroids. Within Allosauroidea, their analyses, based on the dataset published by Wang and colleagues in 2017, consistently found Metriacanthosauridae and Carcharodontosauridae as sister taxa. They named this novel clade Carcharodontosauriformes and defined it as the least-inclusive clade containing both Carcharodontosaurus and Sinraptor. A simplified version of one of the cladograms they published are shown below.

- Allosauroidea
  - - Allosaurus
    - Asfaltovenator
  - - - Chilantaisaurus
      - Neovenator
    - - Eocarcharia
      - Carcharodontosauriformes
        - Carcharodontosauridae
        - Metriacanthosauridae

== Paleobiology and behavior ==
Multiple severe injuries have been found on allosauroid remains, which implies that allosauroids were frequently in dangerous situations and supports the hypothesis of an active, predatory lifestyle. Despite the multitude of injuries, only a few of those injuries show signs of infection. For those injuries that did become infected, the infections were usually local to the site of the injury, implying that the allosauroid immune response was able to quickly stop any infection from spreading to the rest of the body. This type of immune response is similar to modern reptilian immune responses; reptiles secrete fibrin near infected areas and localize the infection before it can spread via the bloodstream.

The injuries were also found to be mostly healed. This healing may indicate that allosauroids had an intermediate metabolic rate, similar to non-avian reptiles, which means they require fewer nutrients in order to survive. A lower nutrient requirement means allosauroids do not need to undertake frequent hunts, which lowers their risk of sustaining traumatic injuries.

Although the remains of other large theropods like tyrannosaurids bear evidence of fighting within their species and with other predators, the remains of allosauroids do not bear much evidence of injuries from theropod combat. Most notably, despite a good fossil record, allosauroid skulls lack the distinctive face-biting wounds that are common in tyrannosaurid skulls, leaving open the question of if allosauroids engaged in interspecies and intraspecies fighting. Remains of the allosauroid Mapusaurus are also often found in groups, which could imply the existence of social behavior. While there are alternative explanations for the groupings, like predator traps or habitat reduction due to drought, the frequency of finding allosauroid remains in groups supports the social animal theory. As social animals, allosauroids would share the burden of hunting, allowing injured members of the pack to recover faster.

== Paleobiogeography ==
The paleobiogeographical history of allosauroids closely follows the order that Pangaea separated into the modern continents. By the Middle Jurassic period, tetanurans had spread to every continent and diverged into the allosauroids and the coelurosaurs. Allosauroids first appeared in the Middle Jurassic period and were the first giant taxa (weighing more than 2 tons) in theropod history. Along with members of the superfamily Megalosauroidea, the allosauroids were the apex predators that occupied the Middle Jurassic to the early Late Cretaceous periods. Allosauroids have been found in North America, South America, Europe, Africa, and Asia. A probable carcharodontosaurian specimen from the upper Strzelecki Group and the Eumeralla Formation (Aptian-Albian) of Australia might potentially extend their known distribution.

Specifically, a world-wide dispersal of carcharodontosaurids likely happened in the Early Cretaceous. It has been hypothesized that the dispersal involved Italy's Apulia region (the "heel" of the Italian peninsula), which was connected to Africa by a land bridge during the Early Cretaceous period; various dinosaur footprints found in Apulia support this theory. Allosauroids were present in both the northern and southern continents during the Jurassic and Early Cretaceous, but they were later replaced by the tyrannosauroids in North America and Asia during the Late Cretaceous. This is likely due to regional extinction events, which, along with increased species isolation through the severing of land connections between the continents, differentiated many dinosaurs in the Late Cretaceous.

== See also ==
- Bone Wars
- Cenomanian-Turonian boundary event
- Theropod paleopathology
