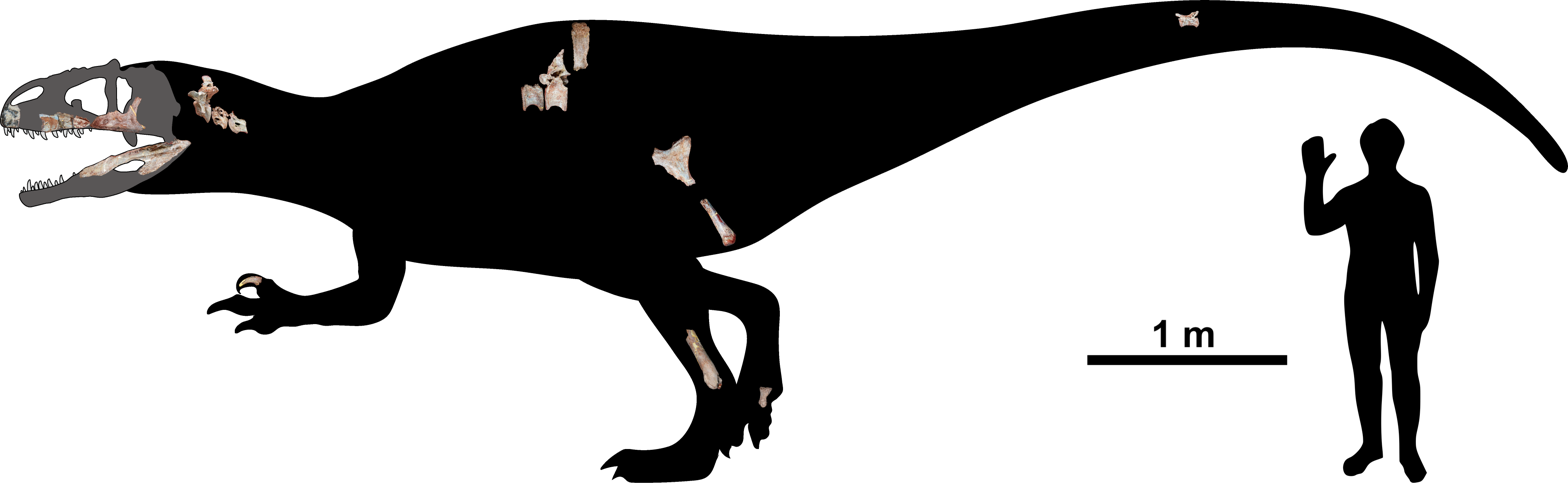
- Skeletal reconstruction and size comparison of Siamraptor suwati

Scientific classification
- Kingdom: Animalia
- Phylum: Chordata
- Class: Reptilia
- Clade: Dinosauria
- Clade: Saurischia
- Clade: Theropoda
- Clade: †Allosauria
- Clade: †Carcharodontosauria
- Genus: †Siamraptor; Chokchaloemwong et al., 2019
- Species: †S. suwati

Binomial name
- †Siamraptor suwati Chokchaloemwong et al., 2019

= Siamraptor =

Siamraptor Temporal range: Aptian ~121–112 Ma

Extinct genus of dinosaurs

Siamraptor is an extinct genus of carcharodontosaurian dinosaur, containing the single species S. suwati, known from the Khok Kruat Formation of Thailand. It is the first definitive named carcharodontosaurian species known from Southeast Asia.

== Discovery ==
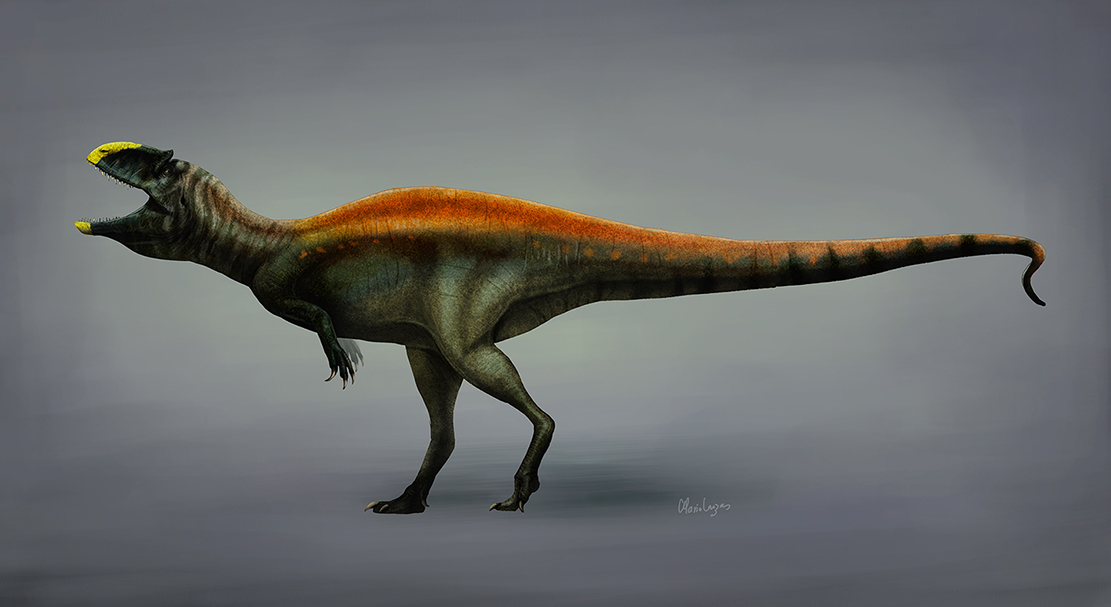
Life reconstruction by Mario Lanzas

Between 2007 and 2009, the Japan-Thailand Dinosaur Project carried out excavations at the village of Saphan Hin, subdistrict Suranaree, Mueang Nakhon Ratchasima District, in Nakhon Ratchasima Province. The finds included bones from a theropod new to science.

In 2019, the type species Siamraptor suwati was named and described by Duangsuda Chokchaloemwon, Soki Hattori, Elena Cuesta, Pratueng Jintasakul, Masateru Shibata and Yoichi Azuma. The generic name is derived from "Siam", the former name of Thailand, and the Latin word raptor ("robber"). The specific name honours Suwat Liptapanlop, who supported the Northeastern Research Institute of Petrified Wood and Mineral Resources.

The holotype, NRRU-F01020008, was found in a layer of the Khok Kruat Formation dating from the Aptian. It consists of a rear right lower jaw including the surangular, prearticular and articular. Further material referred to S. suwati includes the isolated remains of at least three individuals, mostly consisting of skull and lower jaw fragments as well as a manual ungual, a series of three cervical vertebrae, two partial ischia, a caudal vertebra, two dorsal vertebral centra and a neural spine, a partial tibia and a left pedal phalanx.

== Description ==
The describing authors indicated some distinguishing traits. These are autapomorphies, unique derived characters, relative to the Allosauroidea. The jugal bone has a lower edge that is straight instead of convex or undulating while the front branch is high, even under the eye socket. The surangular bone has a deep oval excavation to the rear of its bone shelf and four rear surangular foramina, while other theropods possess at most two. A long narrow groove runs along the suture between the surangular and the prearticular bone. The notch in the suture between the articular and prearticular is pierced by a foramen. The front neck vertebrae possess an additional pneumatic foramen excavating the parapophysis, the lower rib contact. The neck vertebrae and rear back vertebrae have paired small foramina in the base of the neural spine.

== Classification ==
Siamraptor has generally been recovered as a member of Carcharodontosauria. In his 2024 review of theropod relationships, Cau recovered it as a tetanuran outside of the Orionides, as a close relative of Siamotyrannus. Later the same year, the describers of Alpkarakush recovered Siamraptor as a carcharodontosaurian once again.

In the description of the carcharodontosaurid Tameryraptor by Kellermann, Cuesta & Rauhut (2025), Siamoraptor was recovered in analyses as the sister taxa to the European carcharodontosaur Concavenator, both plotting either within Metriacanthosauridae or as early diverging carcharodontosaurians. The results of the phylogeny are presented below.

- Metriacanthosauridae
  - - Siamraptor
    - Concavenator
  - - Shidaisaurus
    - - Alpkarakush
      - - - Metriacanthosaurus
          - - Siamotyrannus
            - - Sinraptor
              - - Yangchuanosaurus shangyouensis
                - Yangchuanosaurus hepingensis

In 2026, Hattori and colleagues described two partial braincases from the Khok Kruat Formation that they provisionally referred to Siamraptor, the only named carcharodontosaur from the formation, despite no overlap with the holotype. Based on this new material, their phylogenetic analysis placed Siamraptor as the earliest-branching carcharodontosaurian.
