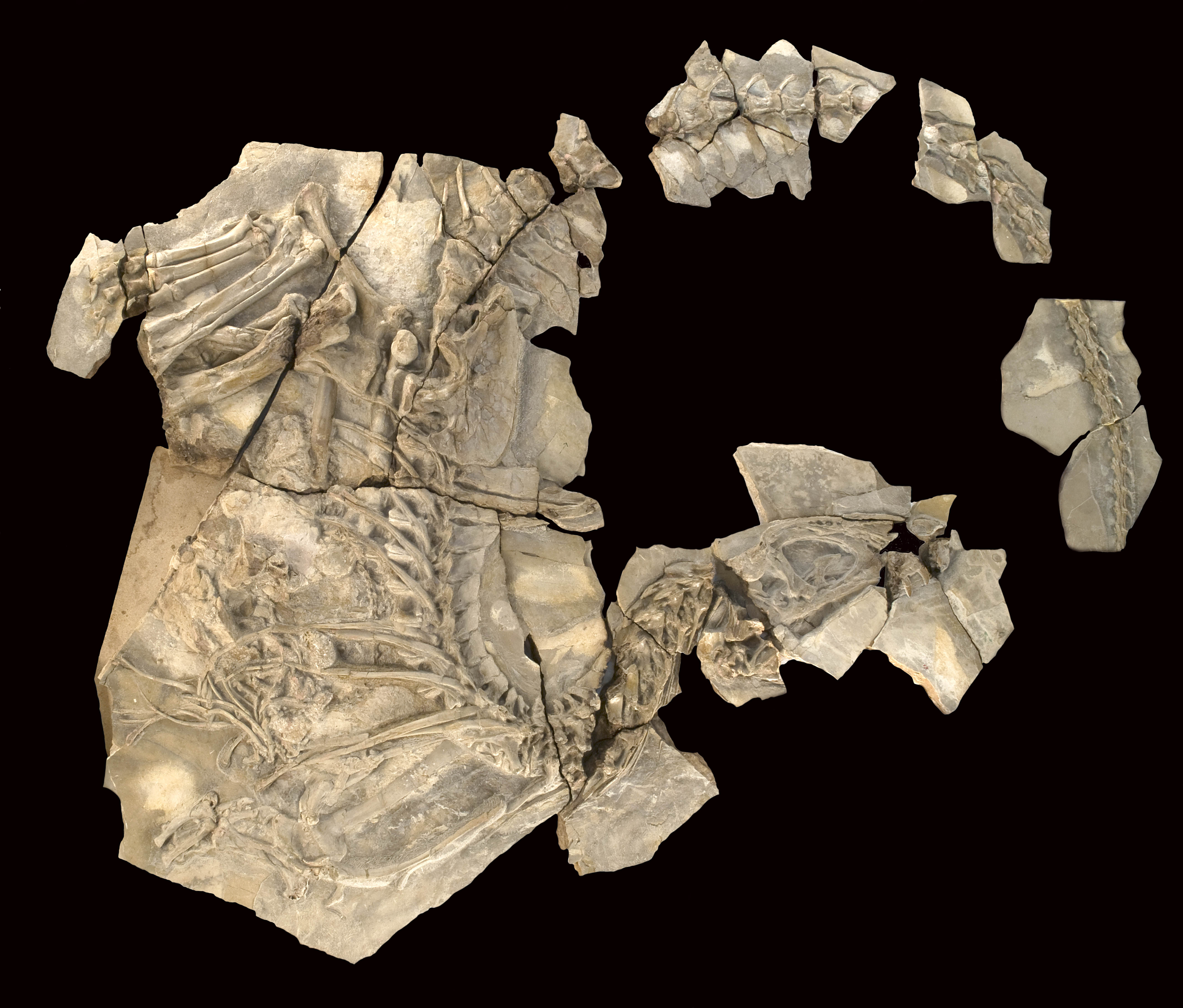
- Holotype specimen in articulation

Scientific classification
- Kingdom: Animalia
- Phylum: Chordata
- Class: Reptilia
- Clade: Dinosauria
- Clade: Saurischia
- Clade: Theropoda
- Family: †Carcharodontosauridae
- Genus: †Concavenator; Ortega et al. 2010
- Species: †C. corcovatus

Binomial name
- †Concavenator corcovatus Ortega et al. 2010

= Concavenator =

Concavenator Temporal range: Early Cretaceous, ~125 Ma

Carcharodontosaurian dinosaur genus from the Early Cretaceous period

Concavenator (meaning "Cuenca hunter") is a genus of carcharodontosaurid dinosaur that lived in Spain during the Early Cretaceous epoch, about 125 million years ago. The genus contains a single species, Concavenator corcovatus, named and described in 2010 from a nearly complete skeleton collected from the Las Hoyas fossil site of the La Huérguina Formation.

Concavenator was a medium-sized carcharodontosaurian, reaching about 5–6 m (16–20 ft) in length and 320–400 kg (710–880 lb) in weight. Unlike most carcharodontosaurians, the neural spines of the last dorsal (back) vertebrae were tall, creating a sail-like structure.

== History ==
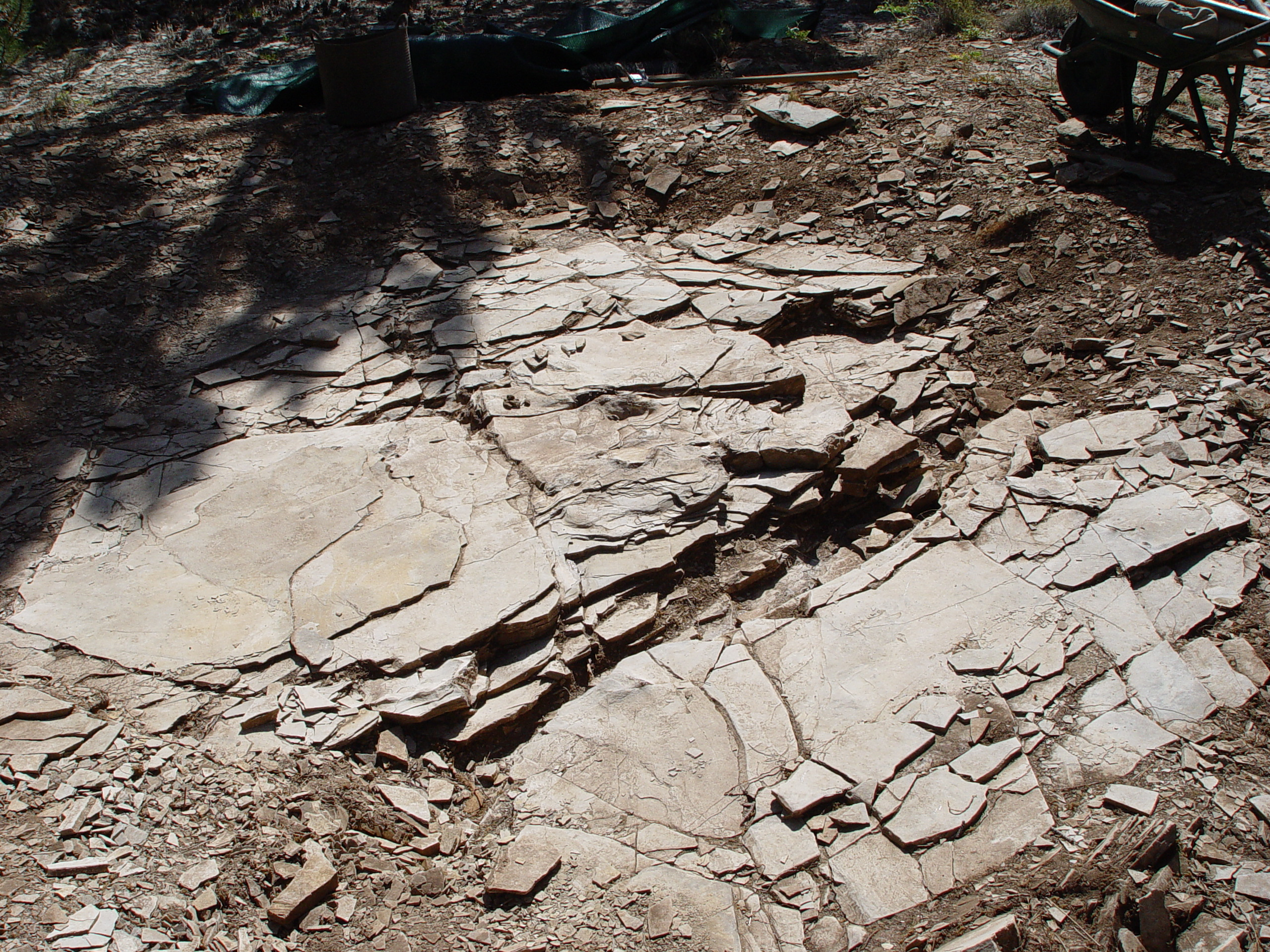
The Las hoyas dig site in 2002 before excavation in 2003

The first fossil remains of Concavenator were recovered from limestone slabs of Las Hoyas locality (considered a Konservat-Lagerstätten; deposits of exceptional fossil preservation) of Cuenca Province, Spain, which belongs to La Huérguina Formation. The remains were represented by an articulated, nearly complete skeleton of a theropod dinosaur individual encased in limestone, comprising the skull, ten cervical vertebrae, thirteen dorsal vertebrae (with the last two presenting an unusual elongation), five sacral vertebrae, thirty caudal vertebrae, a partial pectoral girdle and arm, the pelvic girdle and partial legs, as well as ribs. This specimen was also found preserving integument traces, such as scale impressions on the feet and tail, which is characteristic of many of the lithographic limestones within La Huérguina Formation.

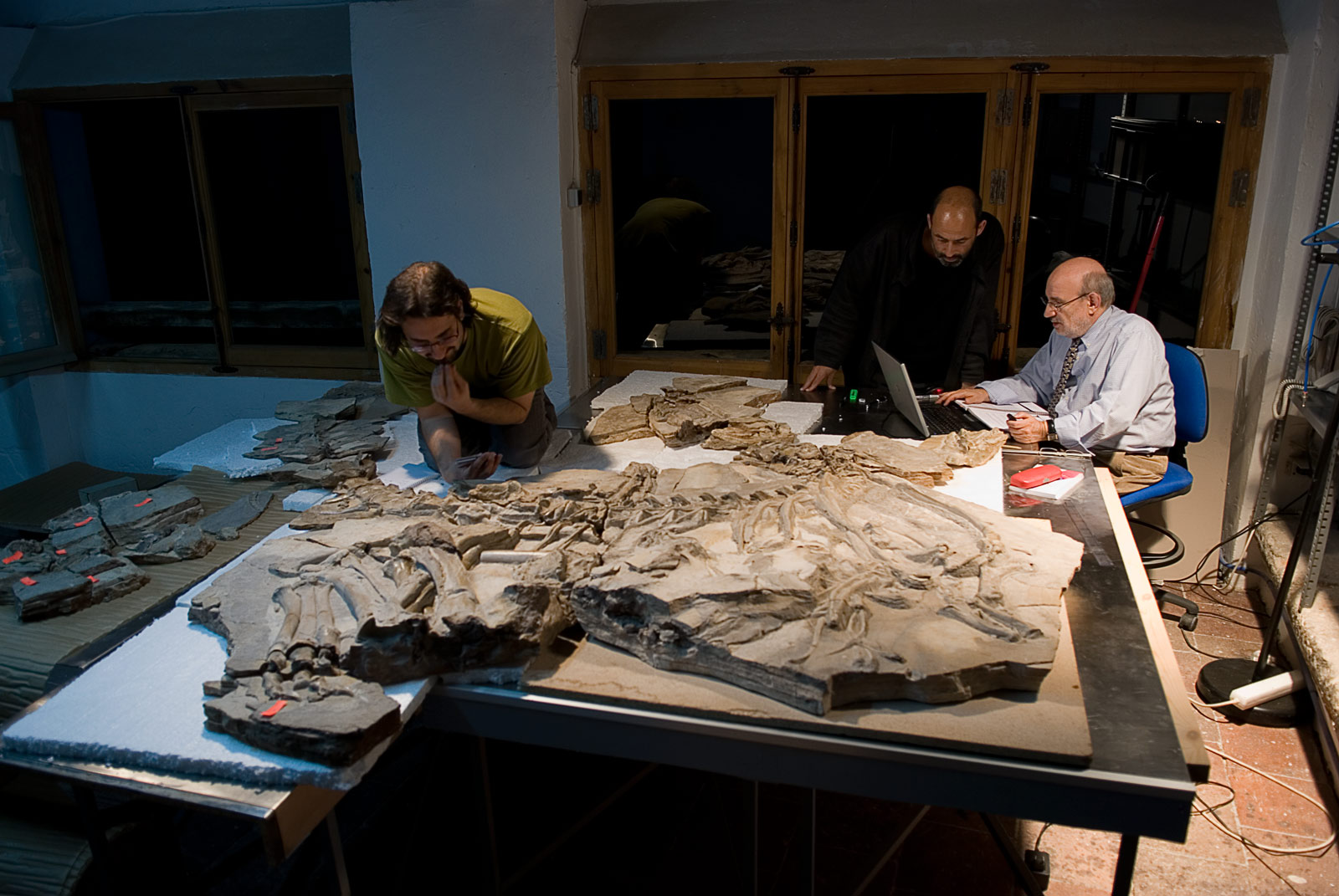
Fernando Escaso, Francisco Ortega, and José Luis Sanz examining the holotype of Concavenator

In 2010, the specimen was catalogued MCCM-LH 6666 and described by paleontologists Francisco Ortega, Fernando Escaso, and José Luis Sanz, used as the holotype for naming the new genus and species of carcharodontosaurid dinosaur Concavenator corcovatus. The specimen belongs to the collection of the Science Museum of Castilla-La Mancha. The generic name, Concavenator, is derived from the Latin Conca, in reference to the region of discovery, the Cuenca Province, and venator, which means hunter. The specific name, corcovatus, is taken from the Latin corcovatus, giving a glimpse onto the hump-like structure formed by the elongated dorsal vertebrae. In their description, the team noted that some anatomical elements had to be left unprepared (without removing the encasing rock), given the delicate nature of the preserved integument traces. Though initially described in 2010, a series of monographs about the taxon and holotype were published later, including examinations of the feet integument in 2015, as well as several anatomical redescriptions of the specimen in 2018.

== Description ==
=== Size ===
Size compared to a human

Concavenator was a medium-sized carcharodontosaurian, reaching 5–6 m (16–20 ft) long and 320–400 kg (710–880 lb). Its skull was 63 centimetres (2.07 ft) in length. It possessed several unique features, including the two extremely tall vertebrae in front of the hips that formed a tall, narrow, pointed crest (possibly supporting a hump) on the dinosaur's back. The function of such crests, however, is currently unknown. Paleontologist Roger Benson from the University of Cambridge speculated that one possibility is that "it is analogous to head-crests used in visual displays", but the Spanish scientists who discovered it noted it could also be a thermal regulator.

=== Integument ===
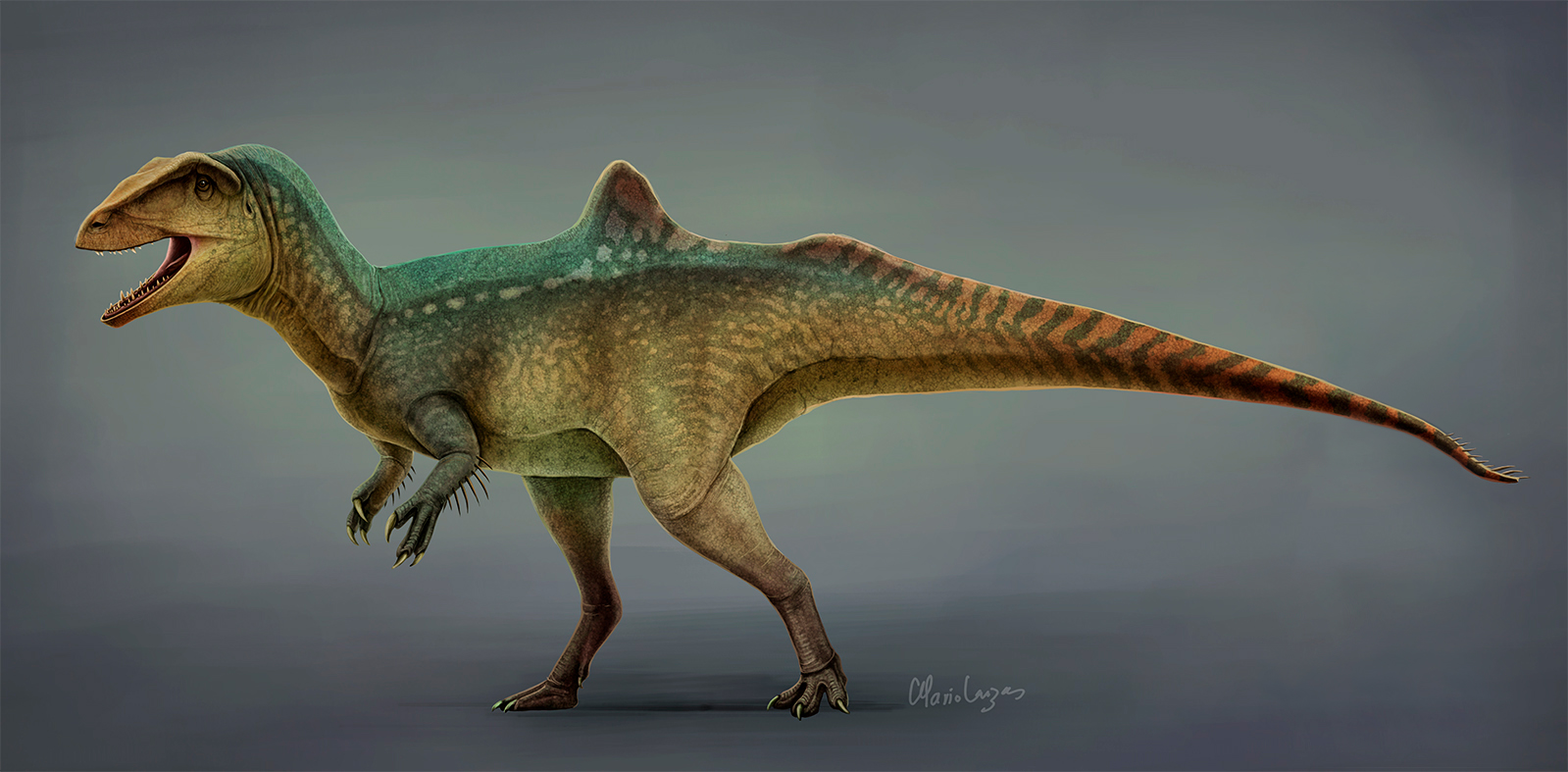
Conventional restoration of Concavenator with scales, a sail, and a small amount of quills

Concavenator had structures resembling quill knobs on its ulna, a feature known only in birds and other feathered theropods, such as dromaeosaurids. Quill knobs are created by ligaments which attach to the feather follicle and, since scales do not form from follicles, the authors ruled out the possibility that they could indicate the presence of long display scales on the arm. Instead, the knobs have been thought to probably anchor simple, hollow, quill-like structures. Such structures are known in both coelurosaurs, such as Dilong, and in some ornithischians, like Tianyulong and Psittacosaurus. If the ornithischian quills are homologous with bird feathers, their presence in Concavenator and other allosauroids would be expected. However, if ornithischian quills are not related to feathers, the presence of these structures in Concavenator would show that feathers had begun to appear in earlier, more primitive forms than coelurosaurs.

Feathers or related structures would then likely be present in the first members of the clade Neotetanurae, which lived in the Middle Jurassic. No impressions of any kind of integument were found near the arm, although extensive scale impressions were preserved on other portions of the body, including broad, rectangular scales on the underside of the tail, bird-like scutes on the feet, and plantar pads on the undersides of the feet.

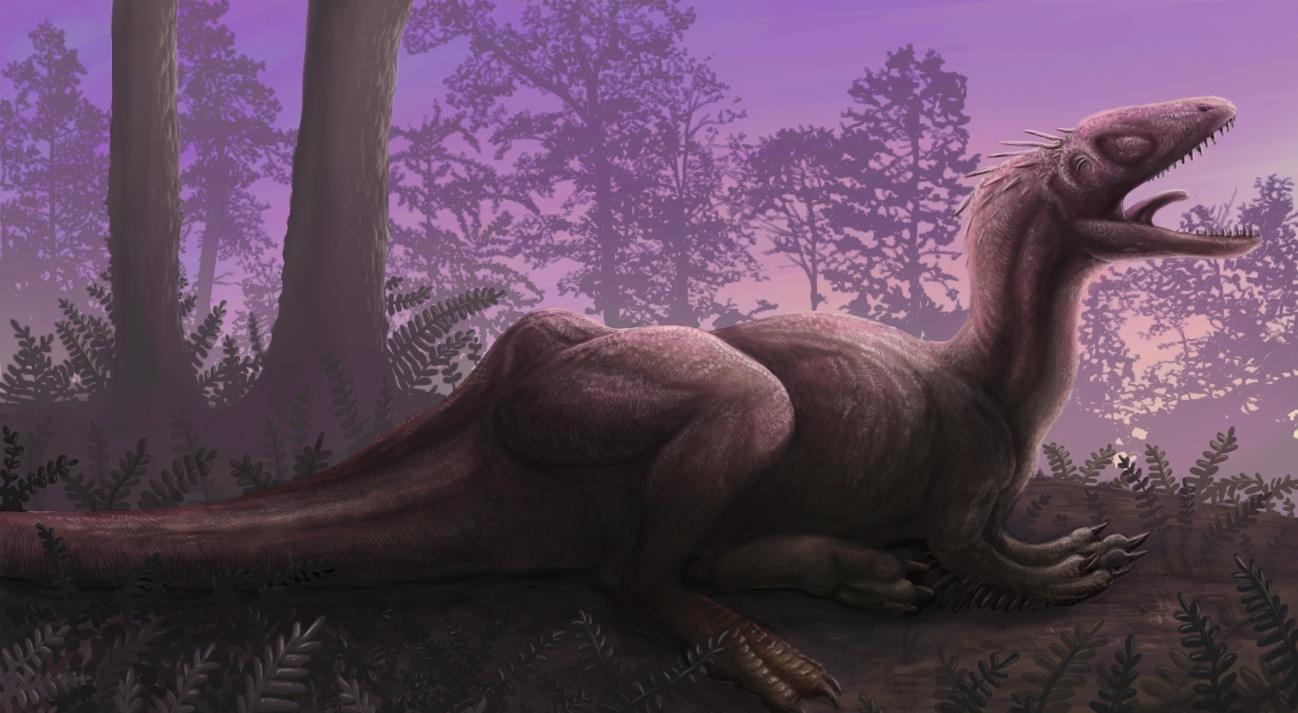
Speculative restoration of Concavenator with a hump as a hypothetical thermoregulatory device

However, the significance of the 'quill knobs' remains controversial, as some amount of skepticism has been raised among experts on the validity of the interpretation that the ulnar bumps represent quill knobs. Christian Foth and colleagues noted that the quill knobs of Concavenator were on the anterolateral side of the ulna. They suggest they were intermuscular lines that acted as tendon attachments. The hypothesis that the bumps along the ulna represented muscular insertion points or ridges was subsequently examined and the results were presented at the 2015 meeting of the Society of Vertebrate Paleontology. Elena Cuesta Fidalgo, along with two of the researchers who initially described Concavenator (Ortega and Sanz), attempted to reconstruct its forearm musculature to determine if the ulnar bumps would be explained as an inter-muscular ridge. They identified the insertion point for the major arm muscles and determined that the row of bumps could not have been located between any of them. They found that the only possibility was that the bumps could be an attachment scar for the M. anconeus muscle. However, this is unlikely because this muscle normally attaches to a smooth surface without marks or bumps on the underlying bone. They argued that the most likely explanation for the bumps was their initial interpretation as feather quill knobs. The authors admitted that it was unusual for quill knobs to form along the posterolateral surface of the bone, but also noted that the same arrangement is found in some modern birds, like the Moorhen.

Restoration of the holotype skull

In 2018, Cuesta Fidalgo published her doctorate thesis on the anatomy of Concavenator, which argued that the ulna was preserved in lateral view. This means that the ulnar bumps were positioned posterolaterally instead of anterolaterally as Cau and Mortimer claimed. Cuesta Fidalgo noted that the proximal part of the ulna is affected by fracturing and abrasion, with certain features that would have shifted when compared to their position in the bone while the animal was alive. For example, in the fossil, the lateral process of the ulna is positioned further posteriorly than the ulnar bumps. In Allosaurus and Acrocanthosaurus, the lateral process is on the lateral (rather than posterior) part of the bone, which would seem to support the ulnar bumps being anterolateral in position if the lateral process was truly preserved in lateral orientation in Concavenator. However, Cuesta Fidalgo described how the lateral process was distorted posteriorly when compared to the bumps and was not valid evidence for the claim that the ulna had shifted into anterior view. The ulna's distortion (as well as genus-specific proportions) means that precise comparisons to Allosaurus and Acrocanthosaurus would be misleading. As Cuesta Fidalgo and her colleagues explained in 2015, the ulnar bumps could not be an intermuscular line if the bone is preserved in lateral view. Cuesta Fidalgo and her colleagues pointed out that these bumps on the ulna are posterolateral, which is unlike that of interosseous ligaments.

== Classification ==
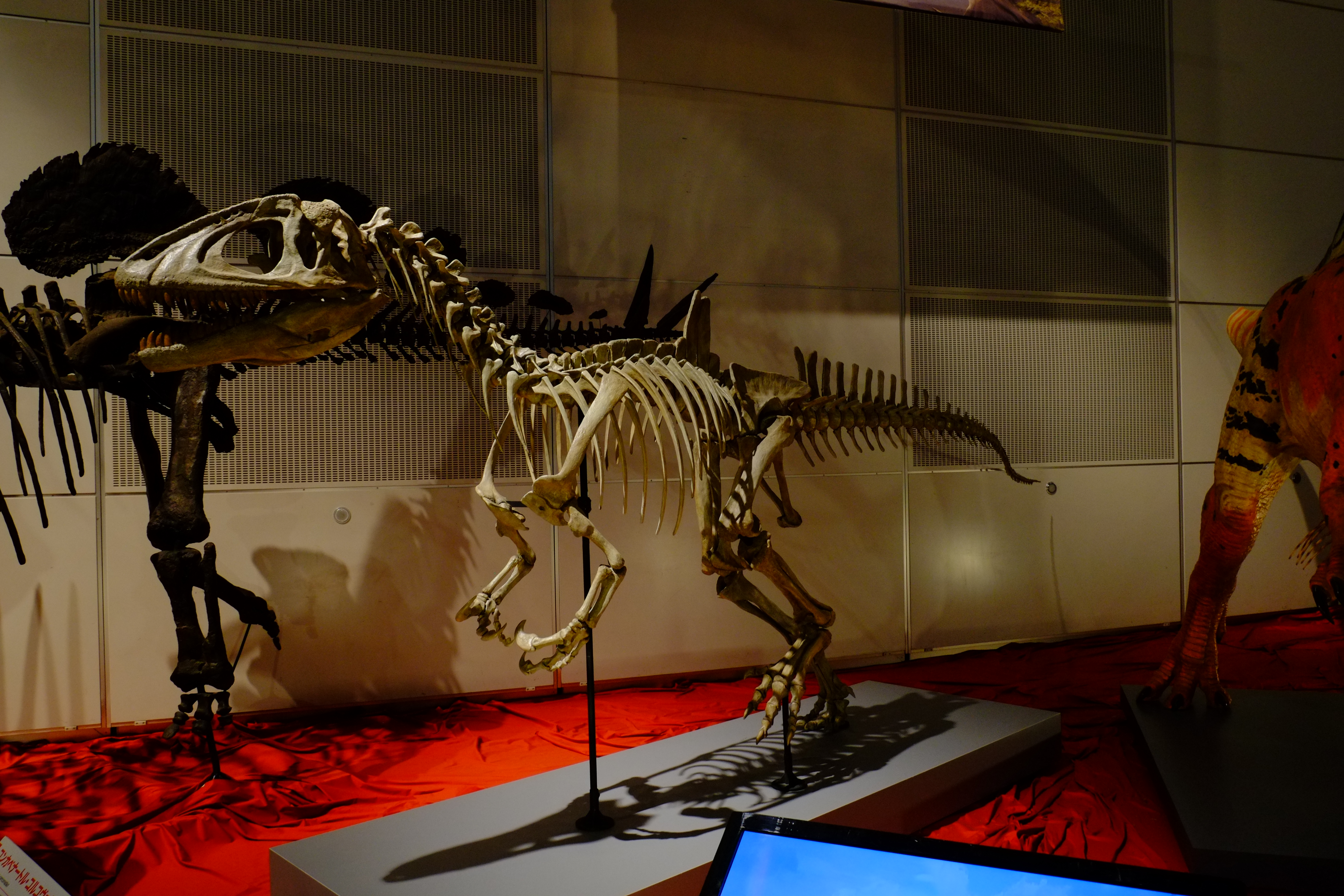
Mounted reconstructed skeleton

In their 2022 description of the giganotosaurin Meraxes, Concavenator was recovered as an early-diverging member of the Carcharodontosauridae, in an unresolved polytomy with Eocarcharia, Lajasvenator, and Lusovenator. The results of their phylogenetic analyses are displayed in the cladogram below:

- Carcharodontosauridae
  - Neovenator
  - - Concavenator
    - Eocarcharia
    - Lajasvenator
    - Lusovenator
    - - Acrocanthosaurus
      - - Shaochilong
        - Carcharodontosaurinae
          - Carcharodontosaurus spp.
          - Giganotosaurini
            - Meraxes
            - - Tyrannotitan
              - - Giganotosaurus
                - Mapusaurus

== See also ==
- Altispinax
- Spinosaurus
- List of animals with humps
