= Dinosaurs: Giants of Patagonia =

2007 film directed by Marc Fafard

- Promotional poster for Dinosaurs: Giants of Patagonia
- Directed by: Marc Fafard
- Written by: Marc Fafard
- Produced by: Carl Samson
- Narrated by: Donald Sutherland
- Cinematography: William Reeve
- Edited by: René Caron
- Distributed by: Sky High Entertainment
- Release date: April 5, 2007
- Running time: 40 minutes
- Country: Canada
- Language: English

Dinosaurs: Giants of Patagonia is a 2007 film about life in the Early Cretaceous of Patagonia, southern South America. It features paleontologist Rodolfo Coria and his work, with Donald Sutherland acting as main narrator.

== Story ==
The movie opens on a scene from approximately 65 million years ago, in the Late Cretaceous of North America. The narrator explains that a massive comet is about to arrive to mark the end of dinosaurs, before taking us back to the Late Jurassic, circa 150 million years ago. From the announced end of the dinosaurs, this time travel serves the purpose of introducing us the biggest creatures to have ever lived on Earth.

We are first introduced to the ocean life of the Late Jurassic period. The first of these is an ichthyosaur, a prehistoric creature resembling a dolphin, with several individuals shown hunting, before one is shown escaping from a Liopleurodon. The movie then takes us to the Early Cretaceous of South America, approximately 90 million years ago.

From this point on, the narrative alternatingly takes us between the work of Rodolfo Coria and the Early Cretaceous. Of all the species of dinosaurs featured, two receive the most focus: Argentinosaurus and Giganotosaurus. The reason for this focus is easily explained by the fact that those two species are Coria's most important discovery. Of these species, the narrator presents two individuals: Strong One (a male Argentinosaurus) and Long Tooth (a female Giganotosaurus).

Strong One is first shown among an Argentinosaurus nest with hatchlings venturing out. The narrator announces that if Strong One survives, he will grow to become one of the largest creatures the Earth has ever known. Then, depicting just how precarious life was, a Unenlagia arrives and steals an egg, which it runs off with to feast on elsewhere. At this point, we travel back to the present day in order to witness Rodolfo Coria's discovery of Argentinosaurus. The narrator explains that Coria owns his own museum, the Museo Carmen Funes (the museum is featured in the movie as we see Rodolfo Coria in his museum with one of his daughters, as he shows her casts of Argentinosaurus and Giganotosaurus skeletons). We see Coria as he arrives at a digging site with his daughters, where he and his team work on digging out an enormous backbone, which one scientist declares larger than any other bone he had seen. They discover that the bone belonged to a large sauropod. They named it Argentinosaurus, meaning "Argentinian lizard".

Following this, we are shown the discovery of a large theropod. Coria emerges from his car and takes a picture of a dinosaur footprint, then he explains that they found more giant bones first thought to belong to another sauropod, but they were later found out to belong to a new theropod dinosaur they named Giganotosaurus, meaning "giant southern lizard". This leads to a new narrative jump through time, bringing us back to the Early Cretaceous. Unlike the previously featured Argentinosaurus nest, which was left unprotected, a mother Giganotosaurus is shown guarding her nest from an Unenlagia. The narrator announces that this parental care was only common to theropods. The female manages to drive the threat away, but only one hatchling hatches: Long Tooth.

The story features both individuals as they grow, highlighting the differences and similarities between both. Strong One as a juvenile is already able to eat from the tops of the trees. Meanwhile, Long Tooth hasn't had much of a growth spurt just yet and is hunting insects. A familiar face by now, an Unenlagia who the narrator introduces as Sharp Feathers, appears to devour an insect Long Tooth had been chasing and she drives him off a cliff. The narrator then explains that even though Sharp Feathers had feathers (as his name indicates) and resembled a bird, he could not fly. Luckily though, he survives the fall.

Rodolfo Coria also intervenes to answer a number of questions about the two species, such as whether the giganotosaurids hunted in packs. The narrator explains that they derived this conclusion from research around the site where the Giganotosaurus was discovered, where several Mapusaurus were also found. The viewers then get to witness one of these hunting parties, as we go back to 90 million years B.C. to see Long Tooth now fully-grown. She now lives in a pack, who are currently stalking the Argentinosaurus herd. The chosen victim is Strong One and he gets slightly wounded, but stands firm and stops the pack from hunting. One of them is killed by his tail in the process and, displaying the cruelty of life, is eaten by Long Tooth and the others. Sharp Feathers, who has survived the fall earlier, briefly interrupts, but is scared off by the gigantosaurs.

The movie then comes full circle, as it goes back to the Late Cretaceous we were shown in the introduction, more precisely in North America where we are introduced to the Quetzalcoatlus, a giant pterosaur capable of flight with wings of a diameter of over 12 meters. As announced, the end of the dinosaurs comes to be and the comet crashes on Earth, killing a Tyrannosaurus rex on screen. The after effects of the crash are explained through a scene featuring the changing scenery as a small group of Argentinosaurus progresses through the land. Eventually, as snow starts to fall and the trees are shown to be bare, one sauropod collapses and the viewer understands that this is the end of all dinosaurs.

The movie also covers various theories regarding the Origin of Birds, explaining that some dinosaurs have evolved to become the birds that we know today.

== Featured genera and species ==
- Anabisetia (unidentified)
- Anhanguera (unidentified)
- Argentinosaurus
- Gasparinisaura (unidentified)
- Giganotosaurus
- Liopleurodon
- Ophthalmosaurus (unidentified)
- Pterodaustro (unidentified)
- Quetzalcoatlus
- Tyrannosaurus rex
- Unenlagia

== Characters ==
- Strong One: a male Argentinosaurus, He smacks and crushes one of the members of Long Tooth's family pack with his tail to defend himself in the last battle. He will reach maturity at 20 years old, and will be 120 feet long which longer than a blue whale and weigh over hundred tons. But he's only at the beginning of more than centuries life, he will keep on growing all of his life at a lower pace that in his earlier few decades. His length will finally reaching at least few times bigger than his earlier centuries, when he's magnificent dusk arrivals.
- Long Tooth: a female Giganotosaurus, She hunts and attacks Strong One with her family pack in the last battle. Long Tooth is a predator like her mother, a 45 feet (13.7 m) long and 8 ton hunting machine. Although she has lots of body mass, but she's still relatively agile. Also, some expert believe that she could reach 30 kilometers per hour.
- Sharp Feathers: a male Unenlagia around 12 feet (3.7 m) long, He appears to devour an insect and is driven off a cliff by Long Tooth, Luckily though, somehow, he survived.

Others:

- Tyrannosaurus: a male Tyrannosaurus rex killed by the comet crashing into Earth, he seems to be the first one of his kind killed by the impact. Before he dies, he is seen and portrayed as a 45 feet (13.7 m) long healthy apex predator.
- Quetzalcoatlus: a giant pterosaur capable of flight with wings of a diameter of around 40 to 50 feet (12.2 to 15.2 m).
- Ophthalmosaurus (identified as ichthyosaur): a prehistoric creature resembling a dolphin, some species of ichthyosaur growing to 75 feet (22.9 m). Several individuals around 20 feet (6.1 m) long shown hunting before one of them is shown escaping from a Liopleurodon.
- Liopleurodon: a clade of short-necked plesiosaurs which is the top of the food chain in Late Jurassic ocean, they are also one of the worst terror nightmares for every marine animal in the Jurassic ocean. The individual shown to be hunting an ichthyosaur is 60 feet (18.3 m) long, but an isolated find points this specimen reaching 80 feet (24.4 m).

== In popular culture ==
In 2009, the Quebec City Maison Hamel-Bruneau museum featured an exhibition displaying models created for the purpose of the movie, several fossils (including dinosaur cranium molds) and clips from the movie. The exhibition served to display the bridge between the work of paleontologists and the creation of a 3D movie featuring digitally created dinosaurs.

== Crew ==
- Director: Marc Fafard
- Writer: Marc Fafard
- Narrator: Donald Sutherland
