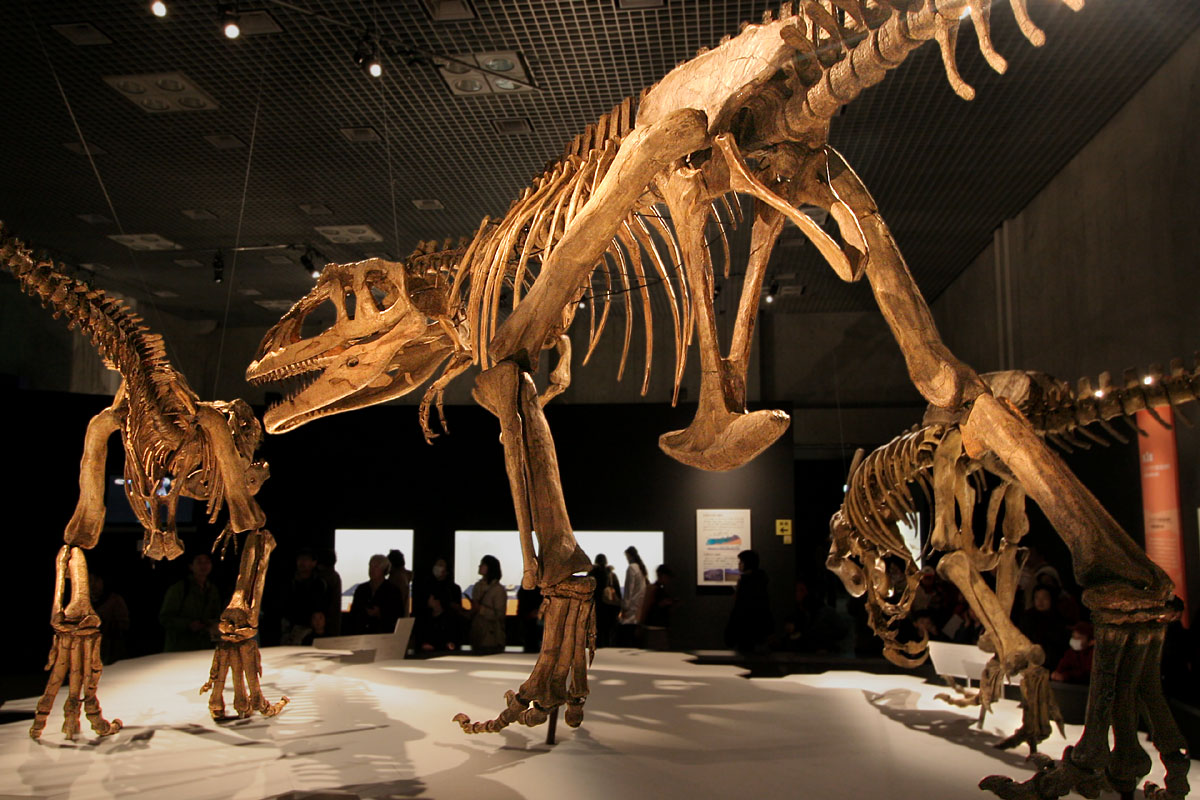
- Reconstructed skeletons of an adult and a juvenile (left)

Scientific classification
- Kingdom: Animalia
- Phylum: Chordata
- Class: Reptilia
- Clade: Dinosauria
- Clade: Saurischia
- Clade: Theropoda
- Family: †Carcharodontosauridae
- Subfamily: †Carcharodontosaurinae
- Tribe: †Giganotosaurini
- Genus: †Mapusaurus; Coria & Currie, 2006

Type species
- †Mapusaurus roseae Coria & Currie, 2006

= Mapusaurus =

Mapusaurus Temporal range: Early Cretaceous (Albian), 106.2 Ma

Carcharodontosaurid dinosaur genus from the Cretaceous

Mapusaurus (lit. 'earth lizard') is a genus of giant carcharodontosaurid dinosaur that lived in Argentina during the Albian age of the Early Cretaceous. It is known from a bonebed of between seven and nine specimens, excavated from the strata of the Huincul Formation between 1997 and 2001 as part of the Argentinian-Canadian Dinosaur Project. In 2006, Rodolfo Coria and Philip J. Currie scientifically described Mapusaurus. Only one species of Mapusaurus, M. roseae, has been described, named after the rose-colored rocks in which it was discovered and sponsor Rose Letwin. Another carcharodontosaurid, Taurovenator, was once believed to be a synonym of Mapusaurus. However, the description of a more complete specimen of Taurovenator demonstrated that they are separate taxa.

Mapusaurus was one of the largest carcharodontosaurids. Based on the biggest specimen known from the bonebed, represented by a left femur, it was originally estimated to have reached a maximum body length of 10.2 metres (33 ft) and a mass of 3 tonnes (6,600 lb). Subsequent works have given maximum size estimates of 10.2–12.6 m (33–41 ft) and 6–8 t (13,000–18,000 lb), respectively. Mapusaurus generally resembled Giganotosaurus, though had a deeper skull, a more rugose maxilla, a rougher surface to its lacrimal bone, differently proportioned neck vertebrae, and various other minor differences. The arms of Mapusaurus were very small, similar in terms of proportional size to those of tyrannosaurids and abelisaurids. During the Cretaceous, Argentina underwent an explosion in carcharodontosaurid and titanosaur size and diversity. Mapusaurus itself coexisted with the giant titanosaurs Argentinosaurus and Choconsaurus, as well as a menagerie of rebbachisaurids, unenlagiids, and ceratosaurs.

== Discovery and naming ==
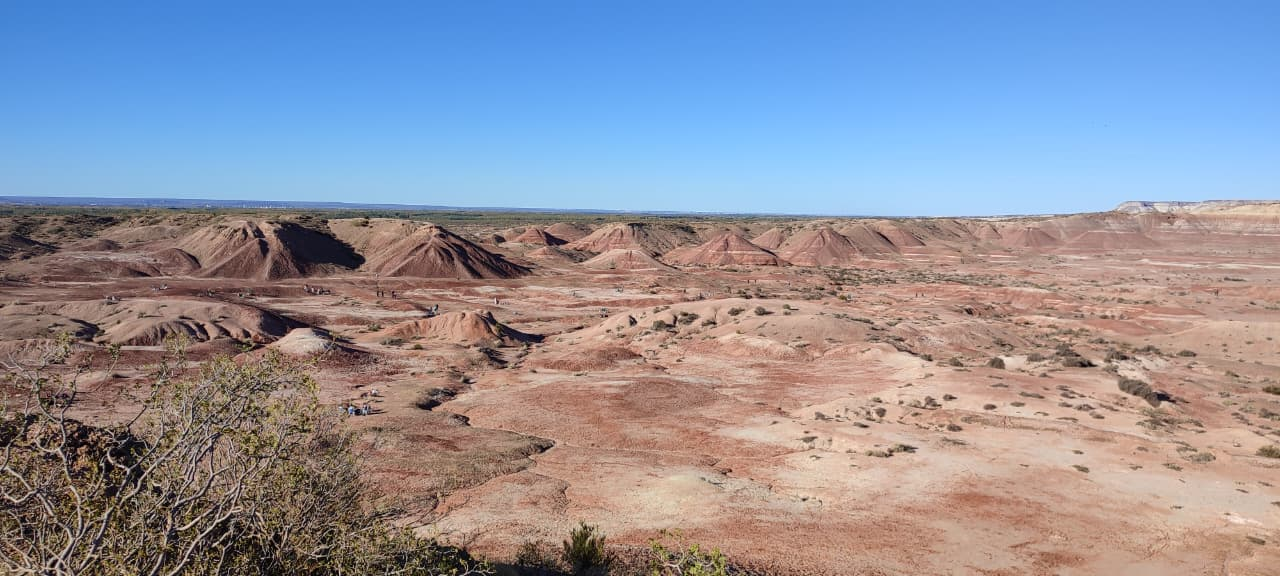
Outcrops of the Huincul Formation in Neuquén Province, Argentina

The first fossils of this taxon were discovered in 1997 by members of the Argentinian-Canadian Dinosaur Project in an exposure of the Huincul Formation at Cañadón del Gato, a site 20 kilometres (12 mi) south of Plaza Huincul in Neuquén Province, Argentina. In 1997, crews from the Project began excavating the fossils, which they believed to belong to a single skeleton of a large theropod dinosaur. However, during preparation of the remains it was realized that they came from several individuals of differing sizes and ontogenetic stages. That same year, Argentine paleontologist Rodolfo Coria and Canadian paleontologist Philip Currie, the leaders of the Project, announced the discovery of the theropod at a meeting of the Society of Vertebrate Paleontology, stating that the team had unearthed a single skeleton of a new carcharodontosaurid theropod similar to Giganotosaurus. By that time, an isolated tooth, a surangular, a caudal (tail) vertebra, a manual ungual, an incomplete pelvis, femora, tibiae, a fibula, a metatarsal and several pedal (foot) phalanges had been collected. Excavations of the fossils at Cañadón del Gato lasted from 1997 to 2001, wherein hundreds of fossils from at least seven to nine individuals of Mapusaurus were discovered. These fossils were mentioned in conference abstracts in 2000 and 2001, which noted the possibility of pack behavior or gregariousness in large theropods based on the quantity and age range of the theropod fossils found.

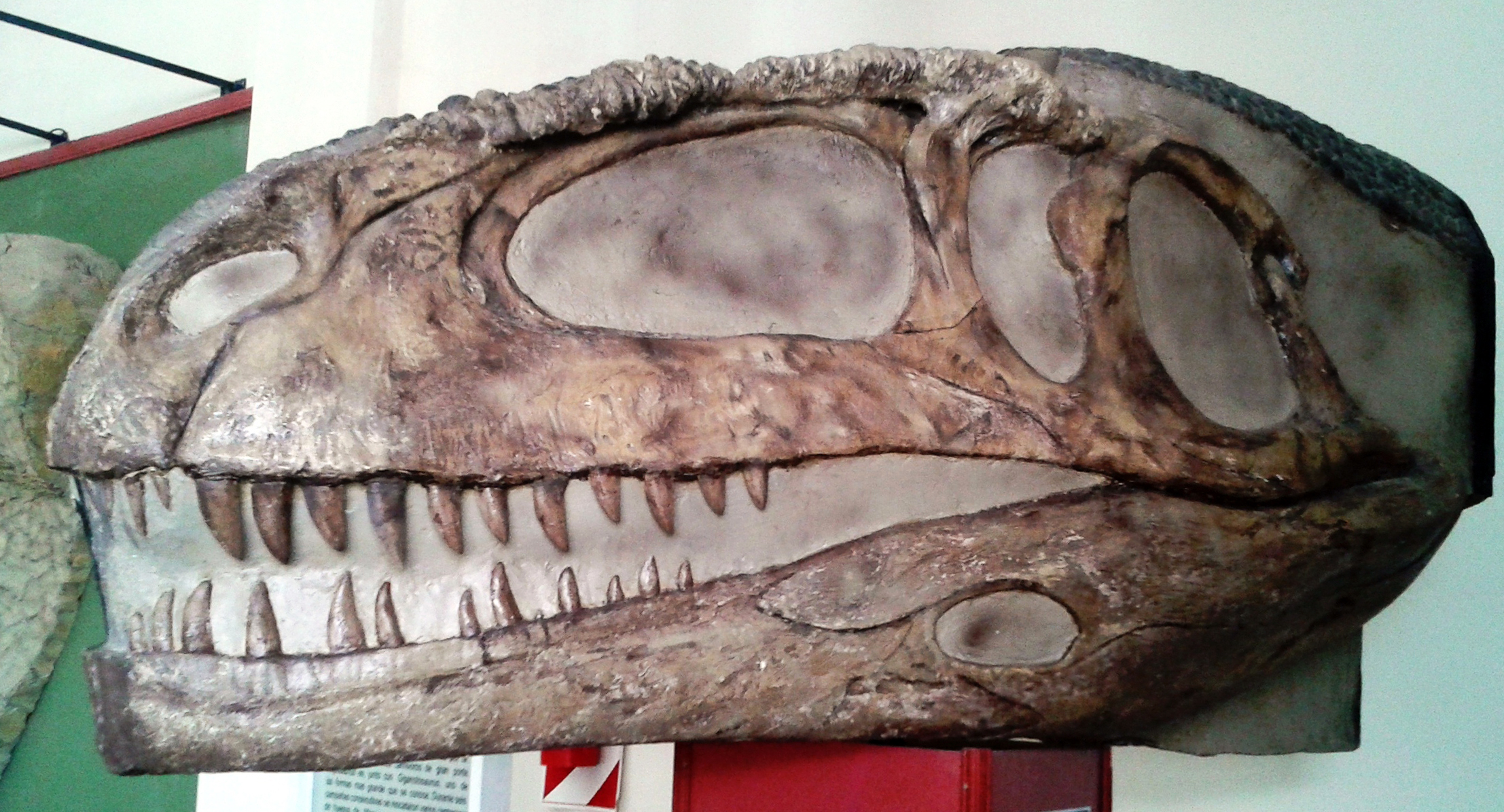
Reconstructed skull at Museo Carmen Funes, where the type specimens are hosued

In 2006, Coria and Currie scientifically described the remains, and identified them as belonging to a new genus and species of giant carcharodontosaurid theropod, which they named Mapusaurus roseae. The generic name Mapusaurus derives from the Mapuche word Mapu, meaning "Earth", and the Greek σαῦρος (saûros), meaning "lizard", and thus translates as "Earth lizard". The specific name roseae is named for both the rose-colored rocks, in which the fossils were found, and for Rose Letwin, who sponsored the expeditions which recovered the fossils. Coria and Currie designated an isolated right nasal (MCF-PVPH-108.1, Museo Carmen Funes, Paleontología de Vertebrados) as the holotype (name-bearing) specimen of M. roseae. Prortions of the skull, limbs, pelvis and vertebrae were designated as paratypes. In total, Mapusaurus is known from parts of the skull and mandible, teeth, some cervical (neck), dorsal (back) and caudal vertebrae, much of the sacrum and pelvis, some ribs, parts of the scapulocoracoid, much of the hindlimbs, many pedal phalanges, and fragments of the forelimb and manus. Later studies have reidentified some of the elements described by Coria and Currie (2006), such as a carpometacarpus that American paleontologist Matthew Carrano and colleagues (2012) stated is the distal (away from body) end of a humerus and a partial fibula that Canadian paleontologist Phil Bell and Coria (2013) identified as a pathological dorsal rib.

=== Taurovenator ===
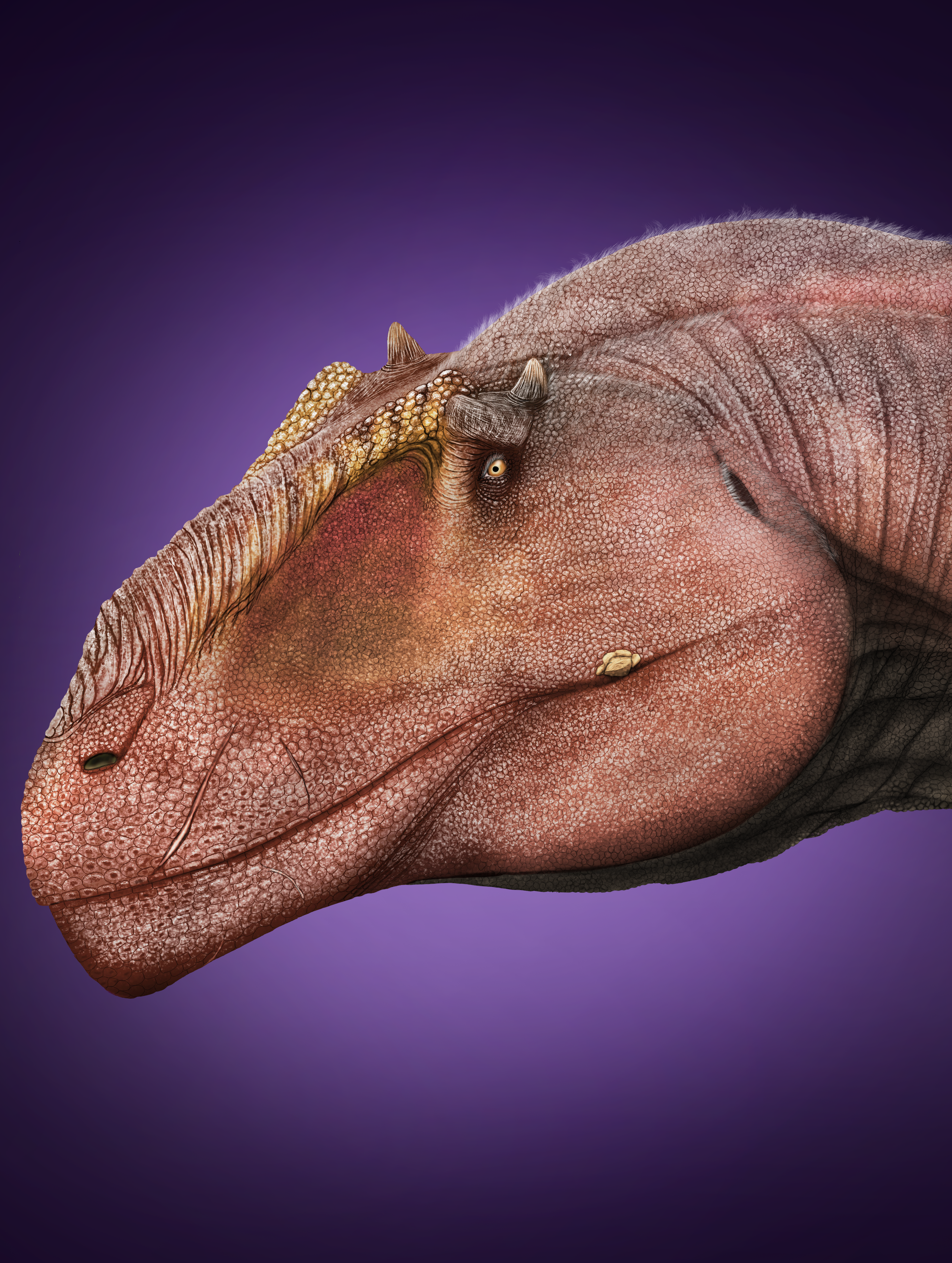
A life restoration of Taurovenator, a genus once thought to be synonymous with Mapusaurus

In 2005, a right postorbital (the skull bone located behind the eye socket) and an associated partial skeleton of a theropod dinosaur were unearthed by Argentine paleontologist Matias Motta from sandstones at Violante Farm in Río Negro Province, Argentina deriving from the lower member of the Huincul Formation. The postorbital was deposited at the Museo Provincial "Carlos Ameghino" and cataloged as MPCA-Pv 803. In 2016, Motta and colleagues described MPCA-Pv 803 as the holotype of a new genus and species of carcharodontosaurid dinosaur, Taurovenator violantei. Taurovenator went largely unnoticed in scientific literature because of its fragmentary nature. Coria and colleagues (2019) suggested that Taurovenator is a synonym of Mapusaurus, as they found no autapomorphies (distinguishing traits) unique to MPCA-Pv 803. Additionally, the authors stated that the two genera were likely coeval. However, Taurovenator is actually from the lower unit of the Huincul Formation, while Mapusaurus is from the upper unit of the formation, suggesting they could be distinct genera. In 2022, another carcharodontosaurid from the Huincul Formation, Meraxes, was named on the basis of a skull and skeleton from the same sandstones as Taurovenator. The authors who described Meraxes stated that Taurovenator lacked autapomorphies and may be coeval with Meraxes.

Although an associated skeleton was discovered alongside the Taurovenator holotype, Motta and colleagues (2016) stated it came from an indeterminate carcharodontosaurid. In 2024, this specimen was described in detail and assigned to Taurovenator. The authors noted that the Huincul Formation is separated into two distinct sequences; a lower section of thin, multicolored sandstones and an upper section of thick conglomeratic sediments. Mapusaurus derives from the upper sequence of the formation, whereas Meraxes and Taurovenator are exclusive to the lower rock layers. Meraxes was collected in strata close to the Candeleros-Huincul Formation boundary, but Taurovenator was found over 30 metres (98 ft) above the Candeleros-Huincul Formation limit. It is for these reasons that the three carcharodontosaurids found at Huincul were potentially not coeval, supporting the argument for Taurovenator's validity. A new host of diagnostic traits were found on the bones of MPCA-Pv 803, properly demonstrating its distinctiveness.

== Description ==
Size of several specimens compared to a human

In their paper describing Mapusaurus, Coria and Currie estimated that the specimens found in the bonebed measured between 5.5–10.2 m (18–33 ft) in length. The smallest specimen is represented by an left dentary, while the largest is known from a left femur. Subsequent maximum size estimates vary from around 10.2–12.6 metres (33–41 ft), and weight estimates range from 6–8 t (13,000–18,000 lb).

=== Skull and dentition ===
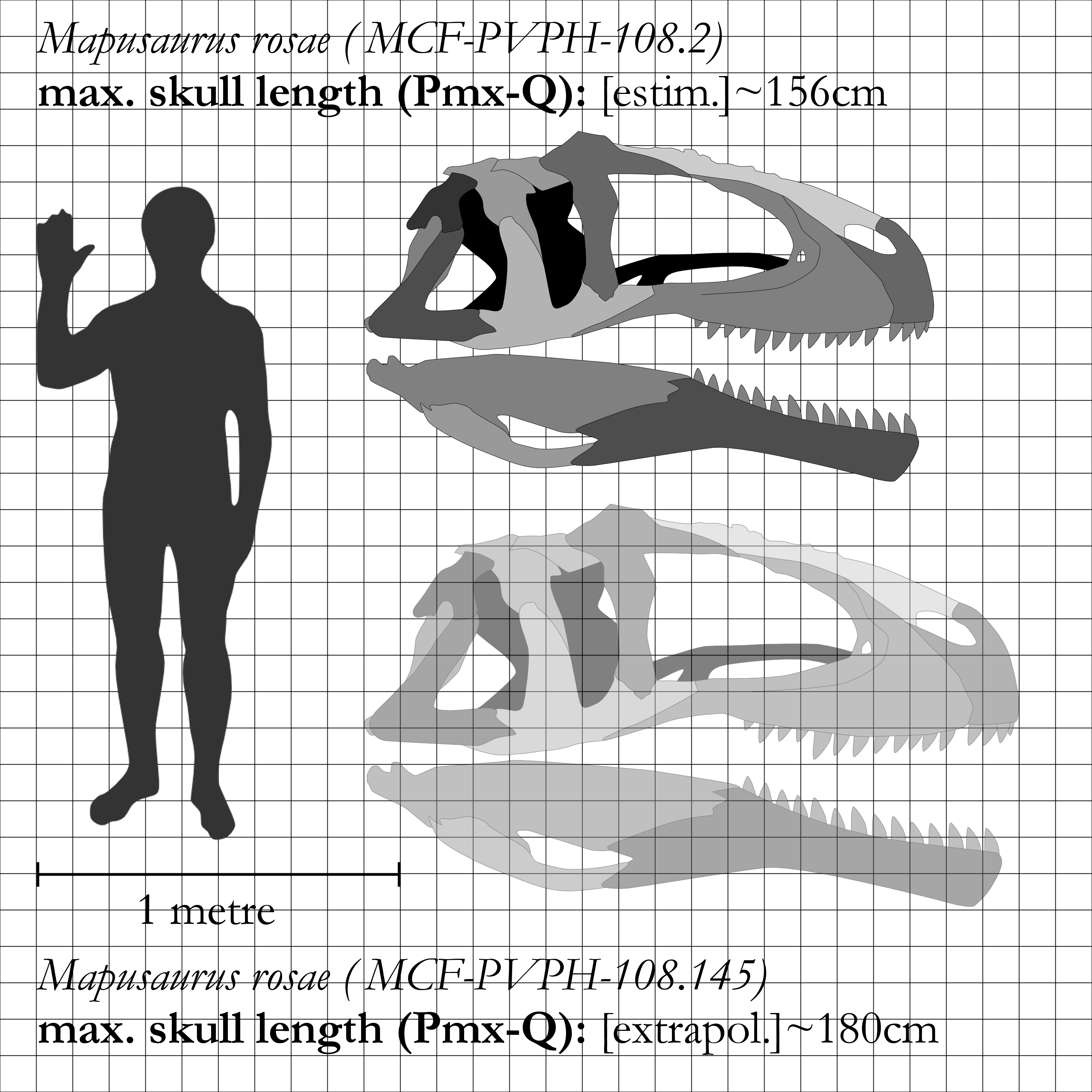
Comparison of two skulls

While most carcharodontosaurids are known from few or fragmentary skull remains, Mapusaurus' is relatively complete. The skull of Mapusaurus was deeper and narrower than that of Giganotosaurus, due to the comparative shortness of the maxillae and slenderness of the nasal bones. These nasals were very rugose, as in Carcharodontosaurus, Giganotosaurus, Meraxes and Tameryraptor, though lack any expansion of the narial fossa (a depression in the nasal bone). The lateral (external, or outer) surface of the maxilla in many carcharodontosaurids (i.e. Carcharodontosaurus, Giganotosaurus, Meraxes and Tameryraptor) had a rough texture, and the same is true of Mapusaurus. Whereas the rugosity of Giganotosaurus's maxilla stopped shortly posterior to (behind) the nasal opening, that of Mapusaurus continued for most of the bone's length. The bar between the antorbital (an opening in the skull in front of the orbit) and maxillary fenestrae, the so-called interfenestral strut, was fairly wide in comparison to other carcharodontosaurids. Whereas many derived carnosaurs had several openings in the maxilla anterior to (in front of) the antorbital fenestra, in Mapusaurus, the maxillary fenestra was the only one, and it disappeared with growth. A long sinuous ridge running horizontally across the outer face of the maxilla is known in Mapusaurus, as well as carcharodontosaurids like Acrocanthosaurus. The antorbital fossa was about equal in size to that of Carcharodontosaurus and Giganotosaurus. The orbit was partly divided into upper and lower sections by projections of the lacrimal and postorbital bones. Like in many derived carcharodontosaurids, such as Meraxes, the lateral postorbital surface bore a robust brow horn. The lacrimals and prefrontal bones were fused, as in many theropods, including Giganotosaurus. The lacrimals of the two genera differed in that Mapusaurus's lacrimal had a rugose dorsal (upper) surface, whereas that of Giganotosaurus bore deep grooves. Mapusaurus's teeth were similar to those of other carcharodontosaurids, being flat, narrow and blade-like and bearing 10–12 denticles per 5 mm (0.20 in), as opposed to 13–15 denticles per 5 mm in Acrocanthosaurus. There were 12 alveoli (tooth sockets) in each maxilla, as opposed to 14 in Carcharodontosaurus.

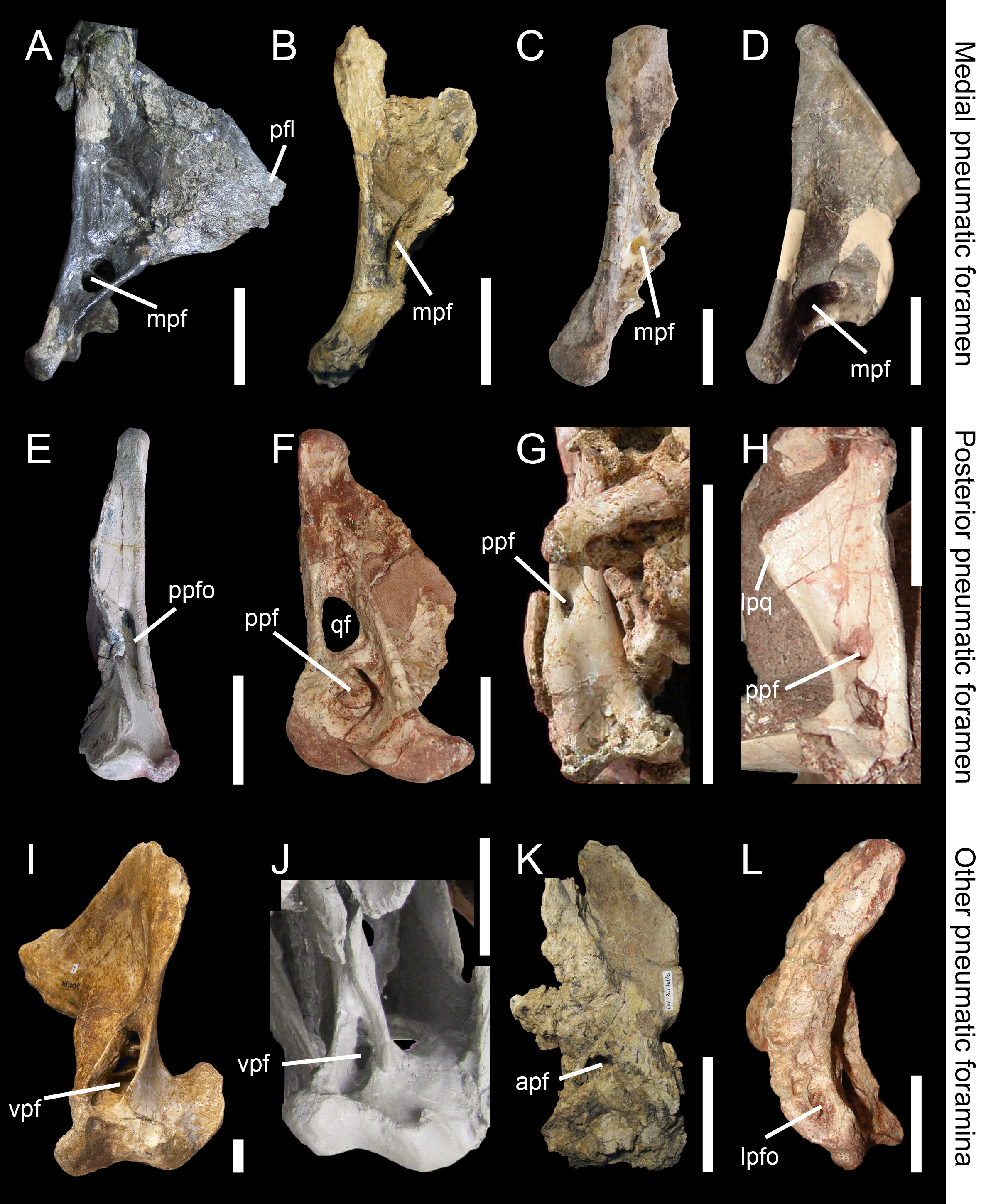
A quadrate (B) compared to those of other theropods

The dentary (tooth-bearing part of the lower jaw) of Mapusaurus was similar to that of Giganotosaurus in that it wider at the anterior end than in most other theropods; this was partially composed of a large flange (growth of bone) on the mandibular symphysis (the area where the mandibles meet). While loosely similar expansions are seen in other groups and genera, such as Tyrannosaurus, in Mapusaurus (and by extension, presumably, other carcharodontosaurids), the presence of this distinctive flange in a juvenile suggests that it was not controlled by ontogeny. In both Mapusaurus and Giganotosaurus, the Meckelian groove is fairly shallow, though that of the former genus was positioned more dorsally. A partial surangular is known from a juvenile Mapusaurus specimen, which is identical to the corresponding bone in Giganotosaurus. The angular bone was strengthened by a thick ventral margin, which contributed to the ventral portion of the mandible. Each dentary appears to have had fifteen teeth.

=== Axial skeleton ===
The vertebral column of Mapusaurus closely resembled that of Giganotosaurus. As in most carnosaurs, the neural arches, the masses of bone or cartilage posterior to the main vertebral bodies, were inclined posterodorsally (rearward and upward). The neural spine (the tall projections at the top of each vertebra) of the axis, the second cervical (neck) vertebra, appears to have been longer and more gracile than those of Giganotosaurus. There were well-developed laminae between the neural spine and vertebral epiphysis, which are not observed in more basal taxa such as Acrocanthosaurus and Allosaurus. Further back in the cervical column, the neck vertebrae were proportionally shorter and slimmer than those of Giganotosaurus, more closely resembling abelisaurids in their proportions. The neural spines of the dorsal (back) vertebrae were relatively tall and were inclined posteriorly. The more posterior dorsal vertebrae were amphicoelus, meaning that both anterior and posterior surfaces were flat. Mapusaurus's caudal (tail) vertebrae are well known from various specimens. The neural spines of the mid-caudal vertebrae were low and anteroposteriorly (from front to back) elongated. The most posterior one had a low regular neural spine and a second, accessory one anterior to it. The anatomy of the preserved ribs, which resemble those of many other large theropods, suggests that the chest of Mapusaurus would have been deeper than it was wide. Various fragmented gastralia, the bones which would have supported the abdominal organs and served as muscle attachment points, are known, and do not seem to have meaningfully differed from those of other big theropods.

=== Appendicular skeleton ===
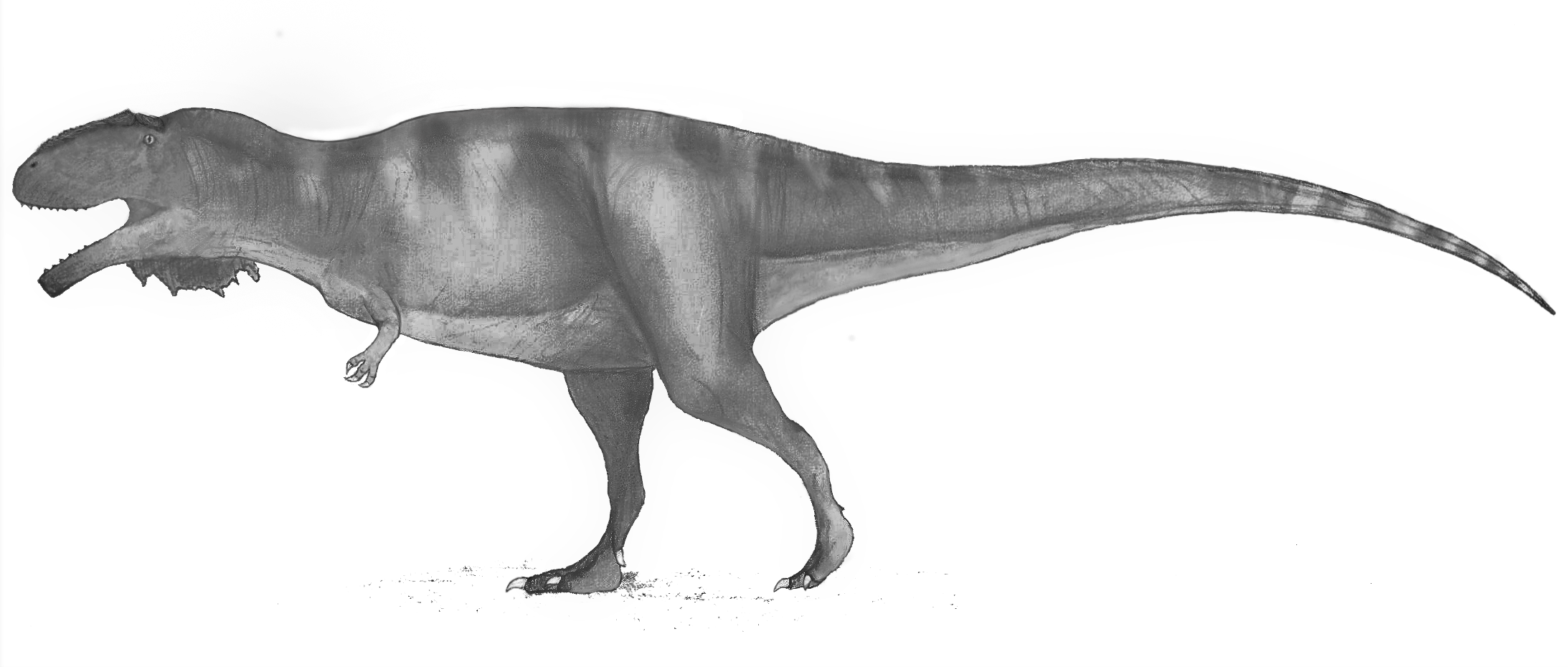
Life restoration

Mapusaurus's scapula (shoulder blade) was long and gently curved, with a pronounced, sharply offset acromial process, similar to other carnosaurs and tyrannosaurids. It is less robust than that of large ceratosaurs and megalosaurids. The scapula and coracoid were distinct bones, and did not co-ossify into a scapulocoracoid. One partial coracoid is known. A possible furcula is preserved, though there is a possibility that it is a fused pair of gastralia. What is known of the humerus (upper arm bone) based on a right humerus, MCF-PVPH-108.45, was fairly robust. The humerus was around a quarter of the length of the femur, and its arms were thus relatively short. The radius (one of the two forearm bones) was relatively massive. Little is preserved of the manus (hand). The second and third metacarpals (hand bones) appear to have been partly fused, though there is no indication that the first metacarpal had fused with the others. A single manual phalanx (finger bone) is known, as well as a probable ungual phalanx (the bone which would have supported a claw) which may be from the second digit.

The pelvis and hind limbs are very well preserved in comparison to the pectoral girdle and forelimbs. The ratio between the preacetabular and postacetabular lengths of the ilium (the parts before and after the acetabulum) is about the same as in the holotype of Giganotosaurus. At the back of the ilium, near the base of the peduncle where the ischium articulated, there were a series of shallow pits, likely attachment sites for the iliofemoralis and caudofemoralis muscles. Three femora (thigh bones) are known. Unlike most other carnosaurs, the fourth trochanter, one of the structures to which the caudofemoralis muscles would have attached, was prominent. It was similar in size to that of Giganotosaurus, though both were exceeded by that of Carcharodontosaurus. Like in Giganotosaurus, the lateral (outer) side of the tibia (one of the lower leg bones) of Mapusaurus extends further down than the medial (inner) side. The fibula, the other lower leg bone, was slightly more gracile than in the holotype of Giganotosaurus. The metatarsals (foot bones) of Mapusaurus were fundamentally to those of other carnosaurs. Eight pedal (foot) phalanges are represented, though no pedal unguals are preserved.

== Paleobiology ==
Mapusaurus' fossils were recovered from a bonebed containing at least seven but potentially up to nine different individuals of various growth stages. Coria and Currie (2006) speculated that this may represent a long-term, possibly coincidental, accumulation of carcasses (some sort of predator trap) and may provide clues about Mapusaurus behavior. Other known theropod bone beds and fossil graveyards include those of dromaeosaurids Deinonychus and Utahraptor, those of Allosaurus from the Cleveland-Lloyd Dinosaur Quarry of Utah, and those of tyrannosaurids Teratophoneus, Albertosaurus and Daspletosaurus.

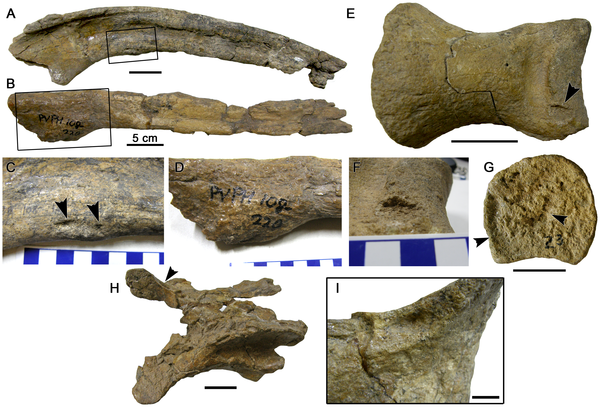
Mapusaurus bones with pathologies

In 2016, Coria, contrary to his published article, stated in a press-conference that this congregation of fossil bones may indicate that Mapusaurus, like Giganotosaurus, hunted in groups in order to take down large prey, such as the sauropod Argentinosaurus. If so, this would be the first substantive evidence of gregarious behavior by large theropods, although whether theropods of that size hunted in organized packs or simply attacked in a mob is unknown.

In a 2015 article, Canadian paleontologist Phil Bell and Coria studied the paleoepidemiology (the study of diseases in ancient organisms) and composition of the Mapusaurus bone bed. In their study, they concluded that there were remains of at least nine individuals in the locality and at least 176 bones were recovered. They discovered a few abnormalities on several bones, including ribs, an ilium, a pedal phalanx and a cervical vertebra. The cervical vertebra suffered form an infection of some kind, possibly similar to tuberculosis. In contrast, the two ribs were fractured and rehealed, likely coming from an older individual. Five erosional lesions were observed on the lateral face of the right ilium, although the cause is unknown. It is possible it came from a tumor-like neoplasia, infection, bone cyst, or some other kind of disease. The pedal phalanx was afflicted with irregular bone growth on its articular surface, which could be the result of several different diseases. Like the other large theropods Albertosaurus and Allosaurus, the ribs were rehealed and were the most common pathology in their respective populations. This indicates that Mapusaurus, like many theropods, lived a hazardous, active lifestyle. Based on the taphonomic setting of the bonebed, none of these diseases were the causes of death for those individuals. Only 2.8% of the Mapusaurus fossils bore pathologies and came from at least one individual and just 11.1% of the total individuals. This indicates that Mapusaurus had a relatively low frequency of pathologies. This bone bed is unique among Huincul Formation sites in that it preserves a wealth of remains, whereas the Huincul Formation typically bears fragmentary or isolated remains.

An ontogenetic (the study of growth) study by Argentine paleontologist Juan Ignacio Canale and colleagues in 2014 found that Mapusaurus displayed heterochrony, an evolutionary condition in which the animals may retain an ancestral characteristic during one stage of their life, but lose it as they develop. In Mapusaurus, the maxillary fenestrae are present in younger individuals, but gradually disappear as they mature. A biomechanical model of Tyrannosaurus presented by William I. Sellers and colleagues in 2017 suggested that speeds above 11 mph (18 km/h) would probably have shattered the leg bones of Tyrannosaurus. The finding may mean that running was also not possible for other giant theropod dinosaurs like Giganotosaurus, Mapusaurus and Acrocanthosaurus.

== Classification ==
Mapusaurus is a genus in the family Carcharodontosauridae, subfamily Carcharodontosaurinae, and tribe Giganotosaurini. Giganotosaurini contains Mapusaurus itself in addition to the carcharodontosaurines Meraxes, Giganotosaurus and Tyrannotitan, but excludes the African genus Carcharodontosaurus. In their description of Mapusaurus, Coria and Currie erected the subfamily (now tribe) Giganotosaurinae. They defined this subfamily as including all carcharodontosaurids closer to Mapusaurus and Giganotosaurus than Carcharodontosaurus and as being united by the presence of a weak fourth trochanter (a ridge on the femur of archosaurs) and a broad groove on the distal end of the femur. They tentatively included the genus Tyrannotitan in this new subfamily, pending publication of more detailed descriptions of the known specimens of that form. Giganotosaurini is a tribe of giant carcharodontosaurines endemic to the Late Cretaceous of Argentina, with some members like Giganotosaurus possibly being the largest theropods known, reaching sizes as large as 13.2 m (43 ft) in length and 4.2 to 13.8 t (4.6 to 15.2 short tons) in mass.

In 1996, American paleontologist Paul Sereno and colleagues described new Carcharodontosaurus fossils which led to the realization of a transcontinental clade of carcharodontosaurids in Africa and South America. As more carcharodontosaurids were discovered, their interrelationships became even clearer. The group was defined as all allosauroids closer to Carcharodontosaurus than Allosaurus or Sinraptor by American paleontologist Thomas R. Holtz and colleagues in 2004. Mapusaurus is better known than many other carcharodontosaurids, but not as complete as Meraxes and Giganotosaurus, which are represented by nearly complete skeletons. Carcharodontosaurians have been recognized from the Late Jurassic to the Mid-Cretaceous of every continent except Antarctica.

In their 2022 description of the large carcharodontosaurine Meraxes, Argentine researcher Juan I. Canale and colleagues recovered the following relationships for Mapusaurus and the Giganotosaurini.

- - Neovenator
  - - Concavenator
    - Eocarcharia
    - Lajasvenator
    - Lusovenator
    - - Acrocanthosaurus
      - - Shaochilong
        - Carcharodontosaurinae
          - Carcharodontosaurus spp.
          - Giganotosaurini
            - Meraxes
            - - Tyrannotitan
              - - Giganotosaurus
                - Mapusaurus

In his 2024 review of theropod relationships, Cau recovered similar results, with Tyrannotitan as the sister taxon to the clade formed by Mapusaurus and Giganotosaurus. His results are displayed in the cladogram below:

- Carcharodontosauridae
  - Neovenator
  - - - Sauroniops
      - Veterupristisaurus
      - Lusovenator
      - Eocarcharia (type skull roof)
      - Concavenator
    - - Carcharodontosaurus iguidensis (holotype maxilla)
      - - Acrocanthosaurus
        - - Eocarcharia (referred maxilla)
          - - - - Meraxes
                - Carcharodontosaurus iguidensis (referred cranial material)
              - - Lajasvenator
                - - Labocania
                  - Shaochilong
            - - - Carcharodontosaurus saharicus (neotype)
                - Carcharodontosaurus saharicus (described by Stromer in 1931)
              - - Tyrannotitan
                - - Mapusaurus
                  - Giganotosaurus

=== Evolution ===
In 1995, Argentine paleontologists Coria and Leonardo Salgado suggested that the convergent evolution of gigantism in theropods could have been linked to common conditions in their environments or ecosystems. Sereno and colleagues found that the presence of carcharodontosaurids in Africa (Carcharodontosaurus), North America (Acrocanthosaurus) and South America (Giganotosaurus), showed the group had a transcontinental distribution by the Early Cretaceous period. Dispersal routes between the northern and southern continents appear to have been severed by ocean barriers in the Late Cretaceous, which led to more distinct, provincial faunas, by preventing exchange. Previously, it was thought that the Cretaceous world was biogeographically separated, with the northern continents being dominated by tyrannosaurids, South America by abelisaurids, and Africa by carcharodontosaurids. The subfamily Carcharodontosaurinae, in which Carcharodontosaurus belongs, appears to have been restricted to the southern continent of Gondwana (formed by South America and Africa), where they were probably the apex predators. The South American tribe Giganotosaurini may have been separated from their African relatives through vicariance, when Gondwana broke up during the Aptian–Albian ages of the Early Cretaceous.

== Paleoenvironment ==
Several dinosaurs from the Huincul Formation (Mapusaurus in red)

Mapusaurus was discovered in the Argentine Province of Neuquén. It was found in the Huincul Formation, a rock formation bordering the Río Limay Subgroup, the latter of which is a subdivision of the Neuquén Group. This unit is located in the Neuquén Basin in Patagonia. The Huincul Formation is composed of yellowish and greenish sandstones of fine-to-medium grain, some of which are tuffaceous. These deposits were laid down during the Lower Cretaceous. Earlier findings suggested a Cenomanian–Turonian age, or possibly an Early Turonian to Late Santonian age. The deposits represent the drainage system of a braided river.

Fossilised pollen indicates a wide variety of plants were present in the Huincul Formation. A study of the El Zampal section of the formation found hornworts, liverworts, ferns, Selaginellales, possible Noeggerathiales, gymnosperms (including gnetophytes and conifers) and angiosperms (flowering plants), in addition to several pollen grains of unknown affinities. The Huincul Formation is among the richest Patagonian vertebrate associations, preserving fish including dipnoans and gar, chelid turtles, squamates, sphenodonts, neosuchian crocodilians and a wide variety of dinosaurs. Vertebrates are most commonly found in the lower, and therefore older, part of the formation.

In addition to Mapusaurus, the theropods of the Huincul Formation are represented by the other giant carcharodontosaurids Meraxes and Taurovenator, abelisaurids including Skorpiovenator, Ilokelesia and Tralkasaurus, noasaurids such as Huinculsaurus, paravians such as Overoraptor, and other theropods such as Aoniraptor and Gualicho have also been discovered there. Several iguanodonts are also present in the Huincul Formation. The sauropods of the Huincul Formation are represented by the titanosaurs Argentinosaurus and Choconsaurus, and several rebbachisaurids including Cathartesaura, Limaysaurus, and some unnamed species.
