= Rodolfo Coria =

Argentine paleontologist (born 1959)

Rodolfo Aníbal Coria (born in Neuquén June 1, 1959), is an Argentine paleontologist.

He is best known for having directed the field study and co-naming of Argentinosaurus (possibly the world's largest land animal ever) in 1993, and Giganotosaurus (one of the largest known terrestrial carnivores), in 1995 among other landmark South American dinosaurs, including Mapusaurus, Aucasaurus, and Quilmesaurus. He is a member of the Argentine Paleontological Association, Society of Vertebrate Paleontology, Paleontological Society and The Explorers Club.

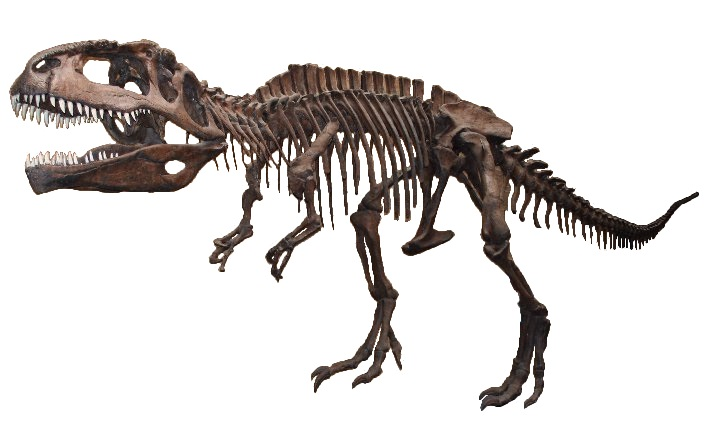
Reconstructed skeleton of Giganotosaurus, giant theropod formally described by R. A. Coria in 1995.

He was a leading researcher at the Bernardino Rivadavia Natural Sciences Museum, in Buenos Aires, director of the Museo Carmen Funes in Plaza Huincul (Neuquén Province), from its opening in 1984 until 2007, when he joined the National Research Council of Argentina.

He and his work were featured in the movie Dinosaurs: Giants of Patagonia (2007) and the BBC Horizon documentary Extreme Dinosaurs (2000).

Below is a list of taxa that Coria has contributed to naming:

Year	Taxon	Authors
2025	Emiliasaura alessandrii gen. et sp. nov.	Coria, Cerda, Escaso, Baiano, Bellardini, Braun, Coria, Gutierrez, Pino, Windholtz, Currie, & Ortega
2022	Elemgasem nubilus gen. et sp. nov.	Baiano, Pol, Bellardini, Windholz, Cerda, Garrido, & Coria
2020	Huinculsaurus montesi gen. et sp. nov.	Baiano, Coria, & Cau
2020	Lajasvenator ascheriae gen. et sp. nov.	Coria, Currie, Ortega, & Baiano
2019	Barrosasuchus neuquenianus gen. et sp. nov.	Coria, Ortega, Arcucci, & Currie
2019	Pilmatueia faundezi gen. et sp. nov.	Coria, Windholz, Ortega, & Currie
2017	Isaberrysaura mollensis gen. et sp. nov.	Salgado, Canudo, Garrido, Moreno-Azanza, Martínez, Coria, & Gasca
2015	Edaphodon snowhillensis sp. nov.	Gouiric-Cavalli, Cabrera, Cione, O'Gorman, Coria, & Fernández
2013	Overosaurus paradasorum gen. et sp. nov.	Coria, Filippi, Chiappe, Garcia, & Arcucci
2012	Lapampasaurus cholinoi gen. et sp. nov.	Coria, Riga, & Casadío
2009	Barrosasaurus casamiquelai gen. et sp. nov.	Salgado & Coria
2006	Mapusaurus roseae gen. et sp. nov.	Coria & Currie
2003	Zupaysaurus rougieri gen. et sp. nov.	Arcucci & Coria
2002	Anabisetia saldiviai gen. et sp. nov.	Coria & Calvo
2002	Aucasaurus garridoi gen. et sp. nov.	Coria, Chiappe, & Dingus
1996	Gasparinisaura cincosaltensis gen. et sp. nov.	Coria & Salgado
1995	Giganotosaurus carolinii gen. et sp. nov.	Coria & Salgado
