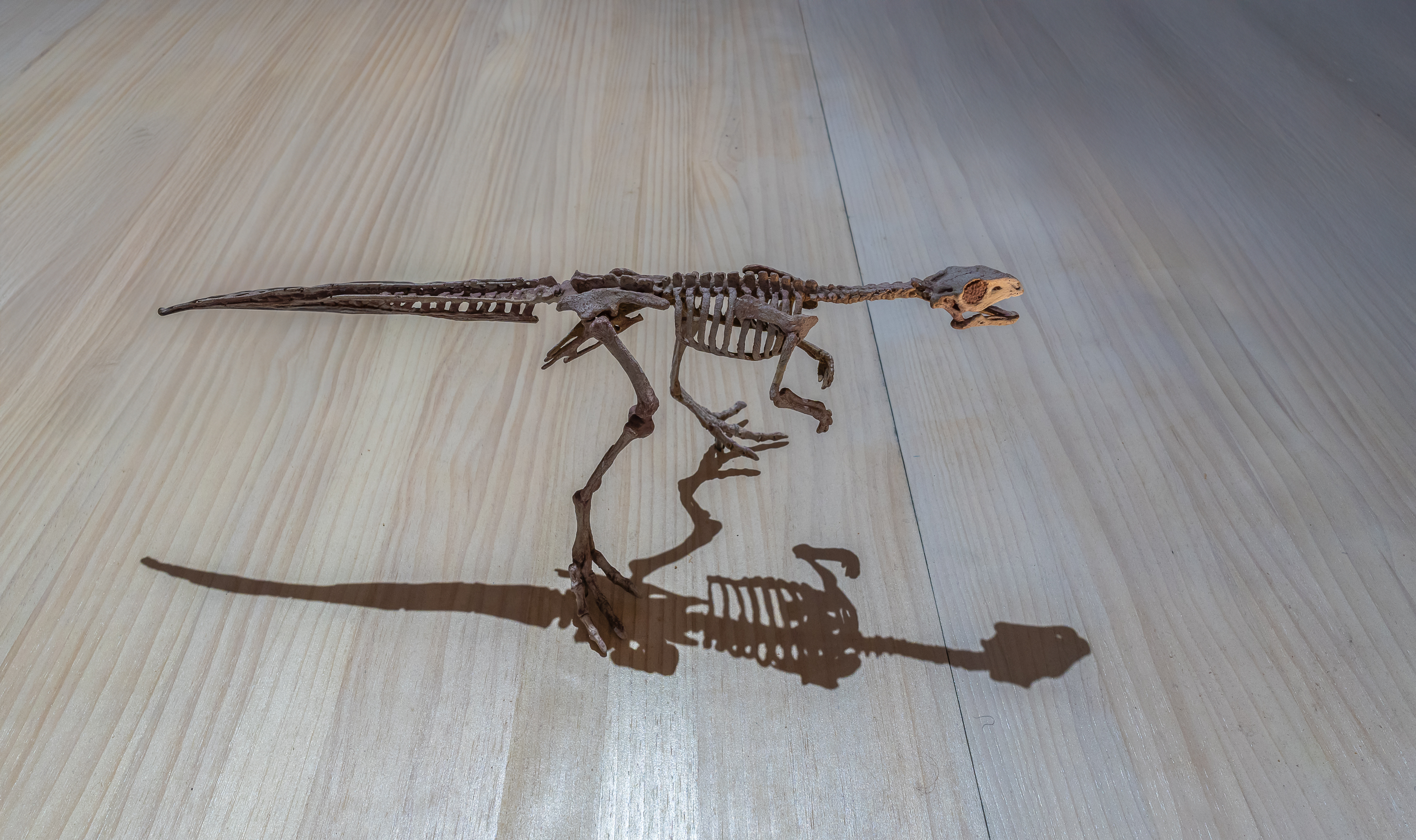
- Mounted G. cincosaltensis skeleton, Chilean National Museum of Natural History

Scientific classification
- Kingdom: Animalia
- Phylum: Chordata
- Class: Reptilia
- Clade: Dinosauria
- Clade: †Ornithischia
- Clade: †Ornithopoda
- Clade: †Elasmaria
- Genus: †Gasparinisaura; Coria & Salgado, 1996
- Species: †G. cincosaltensis

Binomial name
- †Gasparinisaura cincosaltensis Coria & Salgado, 1996

= Gasparinisaura =

Gasparinisaura Temporal range: Early Campanian, 83 Ma

Extinct genus of dinosaurs

Gasparinisaura (meaning "Gasparini's lizard") is a genus of herbivorous ornithopod dinosaur from the Late Cretaceous. The first fossils of Gasparinisaura were found in 1992 near Cinco Saltos in Río Negro Province, Argentina. The type species, Gasparinisaura cincosaltensis, was named and described in 1996 by Rodolfo Coria and Leonardo Salgado. The generic name honors Argentine palaeontologist Zulma Brandoni de Gasparini. The specific name refers to Cinco Saltos.

== Discovery ==
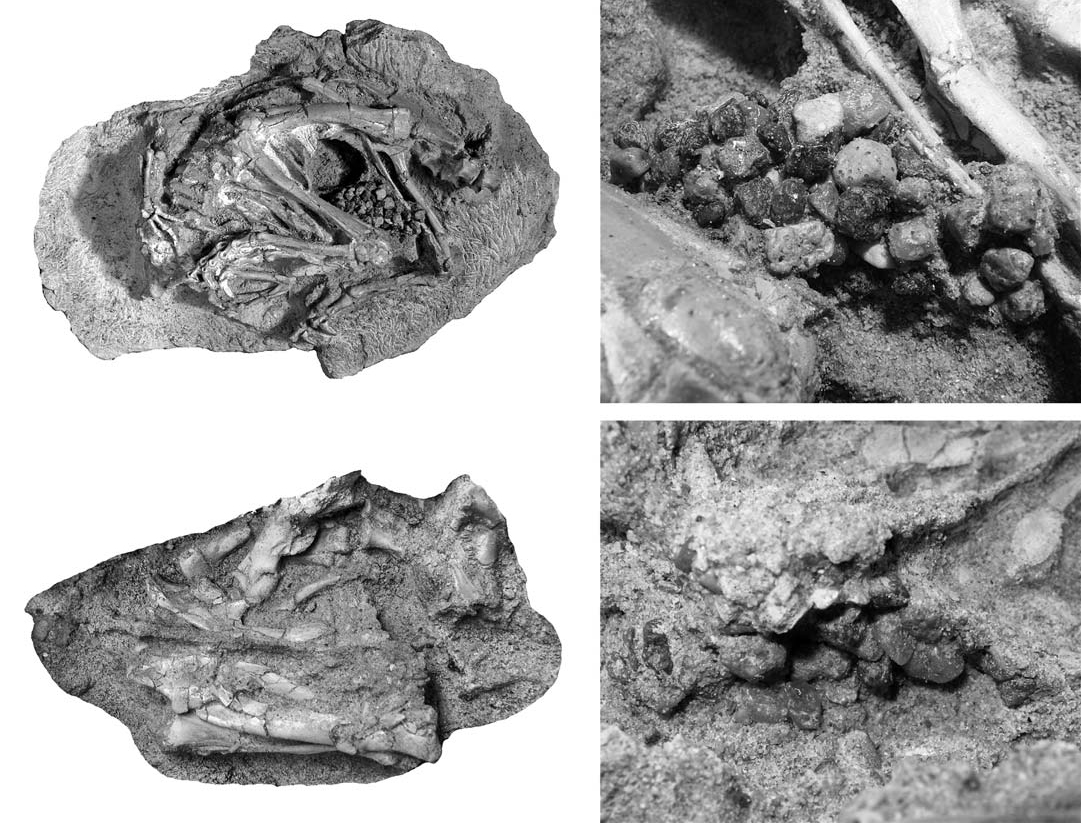
Specimen with gastroliths

The holotype, MUCPv-208, was uncovered in 1992 in a layer of the Anacleto Formation, dating from the early Campanian, about 83 million years old. It consists of a partial skeleton with skull, lacking much of the vertebral column. The paratype is MUCPv-212, a tail with lower hindlimb elements. In 1997, three additional specimens were described: MUCPv 213, a partial skeleton with skull; MCSPv 111, a postcranial skeleton; and MCSPv 112, a skull with hindlimbs and pelvis. The three later specimens represent juvenile individuals. In 2008, gastroliths present with all three juvenile specimens were described.

== Description ==
Size of adult and juvenile individuals compared to a human

Gasparinisaura was a small bipedal herbivore. In 2010, Gregory S. Paul estimated the length at 1.7 metres (5.6 ft) and the weight at 13 kilograms (29 lb).

Gasparinisaura had a rounded head that was moderately elongated. The eye sockets were very large and placed in a high position. The rather long back of the head was pendant. The jugal had a front branch that was thin and wedged between the maxilla and the lacrimal; the back of the jugal was high and broad. The quadratojugal had a long ascending process touching the squamosal, a basal trait. The jaw joints were low. There were about twelve, rather large, maxillary or dentary teeth in each upper or lower jaw. The forelimbs were lightly built. The ilium was short and low, the pubis thin. The hindlimbs were relatively long and powerful, with a short thighbone and a long lower leg. The foot was long and the first metatarsal was reduced to a splint, a derived trait. The tail featured low plate-like triangular chevrons that were expanded towards the back, which is unique in the Euornithopoda.

The gastroliths discovered formed clusters of up to hundred-forty rounded and polished stones in the abdomen with an average stone diameter of about eight millimetres. Representing about 0.3% of total body weight, they were voluminous enough to function as a gastric mill, a function sometimes denied for sauropod gastroliths because of their insufficient relative mass, being an order of magnitude lower.

== Classification ==
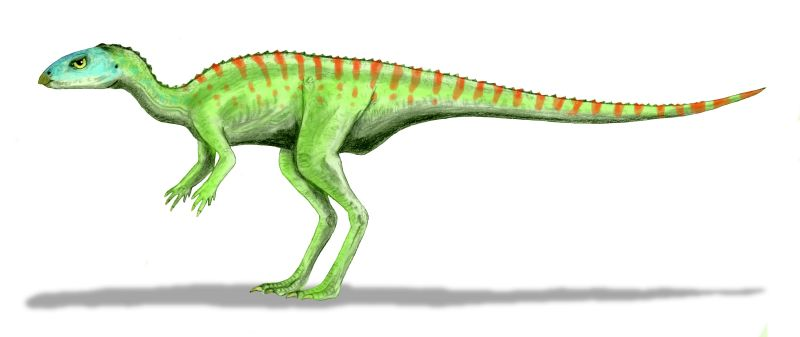
Artist's impression of Gasparinisaura cincosaltensis without feathers

Gasparinisaurus was originally considered by the describers to have been a basal hypsilophodont, the most basal member of the clade ornithopoda. A phylogenetic analysis included in the description of the Antarctic ornithopod Morrosaurus shows that the latter and Gasparinisaura are part of Elasmaria, a clade of hypsilophodonts known from South America, Antarctica and maybe Australia. Gasparinisaura would be the basalmost member of this group.

Cladogram based in the phylogenetic analysis of Rozadilla et al., 2016:

- - Hypsilophodon
  - - Thescelosaurus
    - Iguanodontia
      - Elasmaria
        - Gasparinisaura
        - - Morrosaurus
          - Trinisaura
          - Macrogryphosaurus
          - Notohypsilophodon
          - Talenkauen
          - Anabisetia
      - - Parksosaurus
        - - Kangnasaurus
          - - Rhabdodontidae
            - - Tenontosaurus
              - Dryomorpha
