= Plaza Huincul =

- City
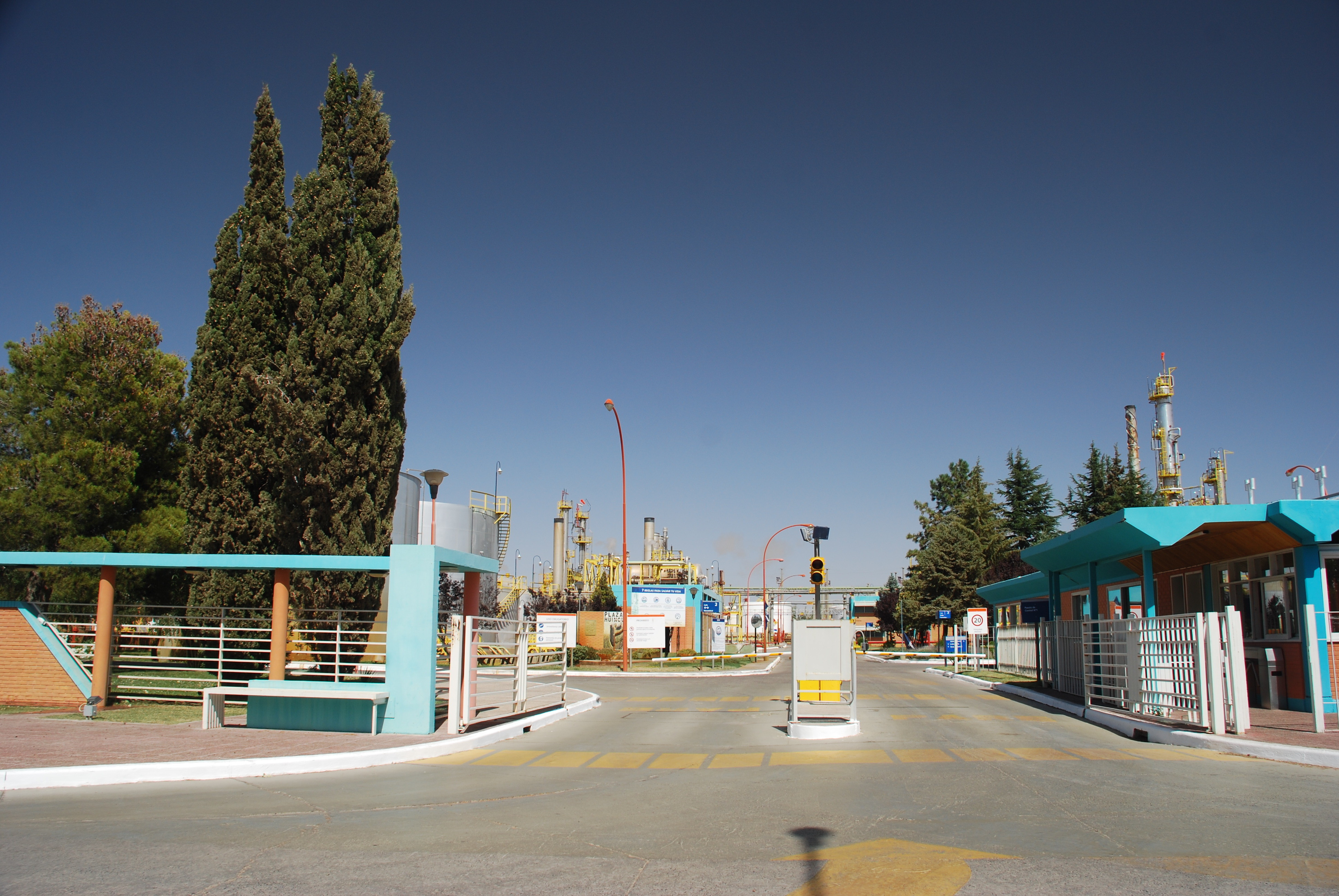

- Location within Neuquén Province Location within Argentina
- Coordinates: 38°56′02″S 69°11′55″W
- Country: Argentina
- Province: Neuquén
- Established: 24 April 1966

Government
  - City Mayor: Juan Carlos Giannattasio (Movimiento Popular Neuquino)

Area
  - Total: 12,000 sq mi (30,000 km^{2})
- Elevation: 1,775 ft (541 m)

Population (2010)
  - Total: 13,572
  - Density: 1.2/sq mi (0.45/km^{2})
- Time zone: UTC−3 (ART)
- Postal code: Q8318
- Climate: BWk

Plaza Huincul is a small city in Neuquen province, with a population of around 13,000 people, located in southwestern Argentina. It is approximately 1,288 km (800 mi) south-west from the capital, Buenos Aires. Plaza Huincul is located in the middle of the desert and grew due to an oil discovery in the area in 1918. The region around the city has yielded the holotype fossils of some of the largest species of dinosaurs discovered to date, such as Argentinosaurus, Giganotosaurus, and Mapusaurus.

Plaza Huincul has an oil & gas refinery that belongs to YPF, an Argentinian oil company and it shares various common factors with the city of Cutral Có (mostly with its paleontological tourism). One of the most important roads in the province go through Plaza Huincul: National Road Number 22.

Its economy is mainly around oil & gas services. There is a growing number of farms that raise sheep and goats

== History ==
The area around what is Plaza Huincul today was first seen in 1876 during the "Desert Campaign". In 1876, a Chilean man by the surname of Campos and his wife Carmen Funes (known as "Pastoverde", translating into green grass) are said to be the ones who first settled into Plaza Huincul and welcomed travelers in case they needed a break; For example, the Pehuenches and Mapuches tribes. They later permanently lived in Plaza Huincul. Plaza Huincul stands for Plaza of the hills.

The town grew rapidly when on 13 September 1918, YPF took employees to Plaza Huincul to work on the first oil rig for YPF (Yacimientos Petroliferos Fiscales). Plaza Huincul then inaugurated a train station on 20 November 1921. A reminder of this is still in place today as a big arch showing the entrance to YPF camp.

On 1 February 1967 Plaza Huincul became a municipality (city).

== Paleontology ==
The municipality gave its name to the Huincul Formation, a fossiliferous stratigraphic unit dating back to the Cenomanian stage of the Late Cretaceous. Argentinosaurus Huinculensis, the largest dinosaur identified from non-fragmentary remains thus far, was discovered in 1987 near Plaza Huincul. Guillermo Heredia, the farmer who found the first specimen on his farm, mistook the uncovered fibula of the sauropod for a petrified tree trunk. It is estimated that Argentinosaurus had a length of 35 metres (115 ft) and paleontologists have estimated that it may have weighed as much as 75 to 100 tonnes.

The next major Huincul Formation discovery came in 1993, when a local amateur fossil hunter by the name of Rubén Darío Carolini stumbled across a tibia from a large theropod whilst out in a dune buggy. A team of specialists led by Rodolfo Coria were sent to excavate the fossil, and returned with an unusually complete skeleton (approximately 70%) including a partial skull. They had found a huge new Carcharodontosaurid, its size likely equalling but potentially exceeding that of Tyrannosaurus Rex, and in 1994, the 12-13-metre carnivore was named Giganotosaurus Carolinii by Coria.

Between 1997 and 2001, Coria and Canadian palaeontologist Phil Currie excavated what they thought to be a new specimen of Giganotosaurus in the Huincul Formation, but they noticed some abnormalities in the bone structure. These differences, almost entirely in the skull, defined the new bones as belonging to a close relative of Giganotosaurus. Thus, in 2006, Mapusaurus Roseae was finally described and named. Mapusaurus also helped support Currie's theory that some large theropod dinosaurs evolved to hunt in groups.

== Geography ==
=== Topography ===
Plaza Huincul is in Neuquen province, which is in the western area of Argentina. Plaza Huincul lies upon the coordinates of: 38°55′00″S and 69°09′00″W. Plaza Huincul has an estimated area of 30,000 km^{2} and lies in a relatively flat and low-lying area. The city has been built along the roads number 17 (Province) and number 22 (National). Road 17 connects Plaza Huincul with Osorno, Chile and even Bariloche. Plaza Huincul is situated around 161 km from international border between Argentina and Chile.

=== Climate ===
Plaza Huincul features a desert climate. Temperatures vary throughout the year with an average of 13.1 °C. The hottest month is January with an average of 29 degrees Celsius, where the coldest month is July with an average of 0 degrees Celsius. Plaza Huincul sees low precipitation with an overall value of 157mm per year and around 13mm every month.

Climate data for Plaza Huincul (1984–1994)
Month	Jan	Feb	Mar	Apr	May	Jun	Jul	Aug	Sep	Oct	Nov	Dec	Year
Record high °C (°F)	38.9 (102.0)	38.9 (102.0)	33.9 (93.0)	32.2 (90.0)	26.1 (79.0)	25.0 (77.0)	25.0 (77.0)	26.1 (79.0)	28.9 (84.0)	32.2 (90.0)	36.1 (97.0)	37.8 (100.0)	38.9 (102.0)
Mean daily maximum °C (°F)	31.1 (88.0)	28.9 (84.0)	25.0 (77.0)	20.0 (68.0)	15.0 (59.0)	12.2 (54.0)	11.1 (52.0)	12.8 (55.0)	17.2 (63.0)	22.2 (72.0)	26.1 (79.0)	28.9 (84.0)	20.9 (69.6)
Daily mean °C (°F)	23.1 (73.6)	21.4 (70.5)	18.1 (64.6)	13.6 (56.5)	9.5 (49.1)	7.2 (45.0)	5.6 (42.1)	6.9 (44.4)	10.6 (51.1)	14.7 (58.5)	18.1 (64.6)	20.8 (69.4)	14.1 (57.4)
Mean daily minimum °C (°F)	15.0 (59.0)	13.9 (57.0)	11.1 (52.0)	7.2 (45.0)	3.9 (39.0)	2.2 (36.0)	0.0 (32.0)	1.1 (34.0)	3.9 (39.0)	7.2 (45.0)	10.0 (50.0)	12.8 (55.0)	7.4 (45.3)
Record low °C (°F)	3.9 (39.0)	5.0 (41.0)	1.1 (34.0)	−2.2 (28.0)	−5.0 (23.0)	−7.8 (18.0)	−11.1 (12.0)	−8.9 (16.0)	−5.0 (23.0)	−1.1 (30.0)	0.0 (32.0)	2.8 (37.0)	−11.1 (12.0)
Average precipitation mm (inches)	20.3 (0.80)	6.6 (0.26)	9.7 (0.38)	11.7 (0.46)	22.6 (0.89)	9.1 (0.36)	11.7 (0.46)	12.7 (0.50)	9.4 (0.37)	8.1 (0.32)	3.3 (0.13)	6.9 (0.27)	132.0 (5.20)
Source: Sistema de Clasificación Bioclimática Mundial
