= Museo Carmen Funes =

Paleontology museum in Plaza Huincul, Neuquén, Argentina

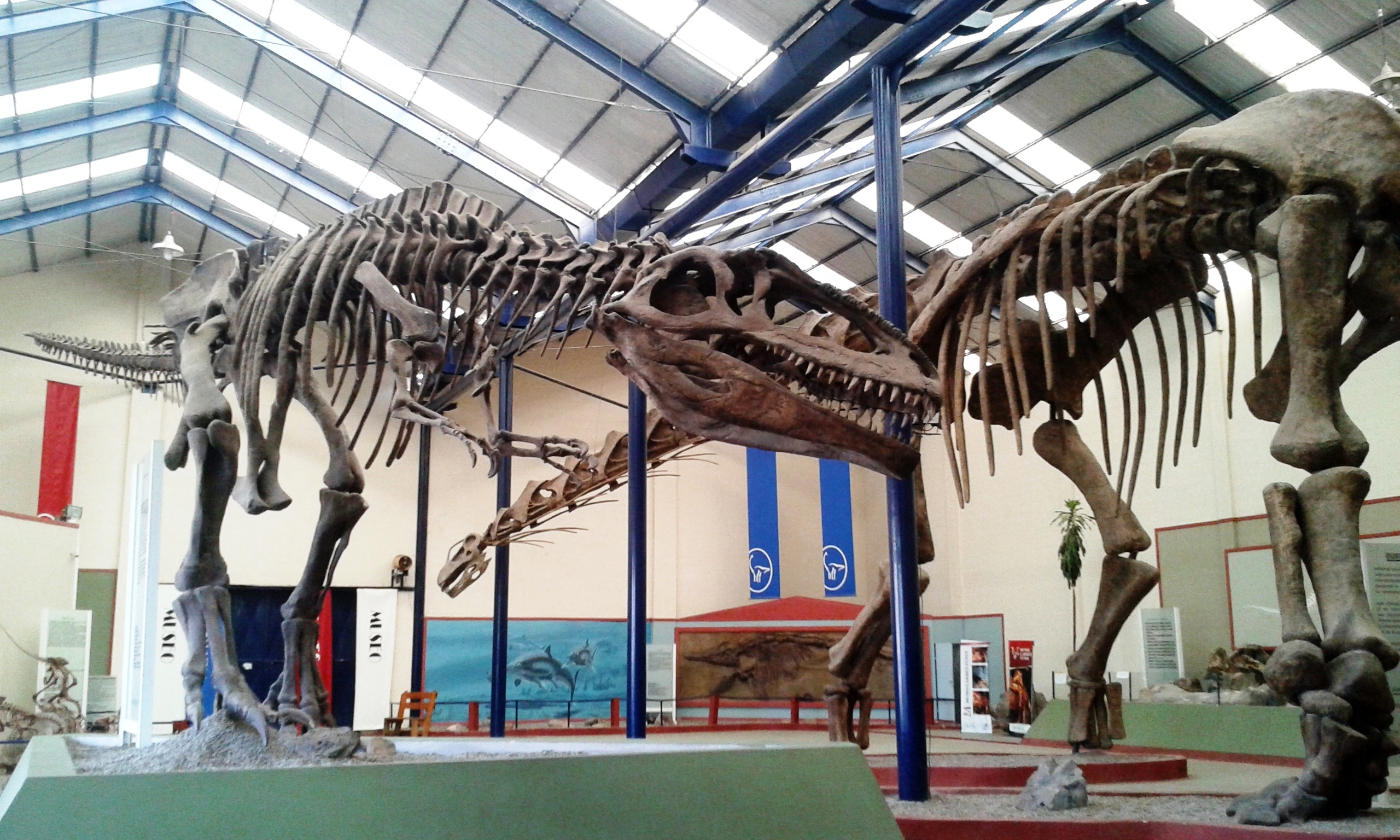
- Location: Plaza Huincul, Argentina
- Coordinates: 38°55′52″S 69°11′37″W
- Type: museum
- Location of Museo Carmen Funes

Museo Municipal Carmen Funes, or, the Carmen Funes Municipal Museum, is a museum of paleontology in Plaza Huincul, Neuquén Province, Argentina. It is best known for its collection of dinosaur fossils, including the only specimen of the largest recorded dinosaur remains, Argentinosaurus huinculensis, and the only known sauropod embryos, which were discovered at a huge nesting site in Auca Mahuida, Patagonia. Its standard abbreviation is MCF-PVPH, or just PVPH to denote the paleontological collection.

== Overview ==
The museum's founder and director is Rodolfo Coria. It has an exhibition area, workshops for preparing fossils, and stores. Fieldwork, often in cooperation with American museums, continues in fossil-rich Patagonia. The museum's collections include 11 holotype specimens.

Significant past exhibits include:

- "Tiniest Giants: Discovering Dinosaur Eggs": Features the sauropod eggs and embryos from Patagonia, in cooperation with the Natural History Museum of Los Angeles County.
- "Giants of the Mesozoic": Features a mock battle between the largest terrestrial predator known, the Giganotosaurus, and the largest terrestrial animal known, the plant-eating Argentinosaurus, with the Fernbank Museum of Natural History in Atlanta, Georgia.

The museum was established in 1984 with municipal funding and has become a significant tourist attraction in the province of Neuquén Province. The museum is located at 55 Córdoba Avenue, Plaza Huincul, Neuquén Province (postal code 8318), east of the intersection of National Route 22 and Provincial Route 17.

In 2024, the museum and its attractions featured in a documentary about dinosaurs of Patagonia produced by French and Japanese filmmakers.
