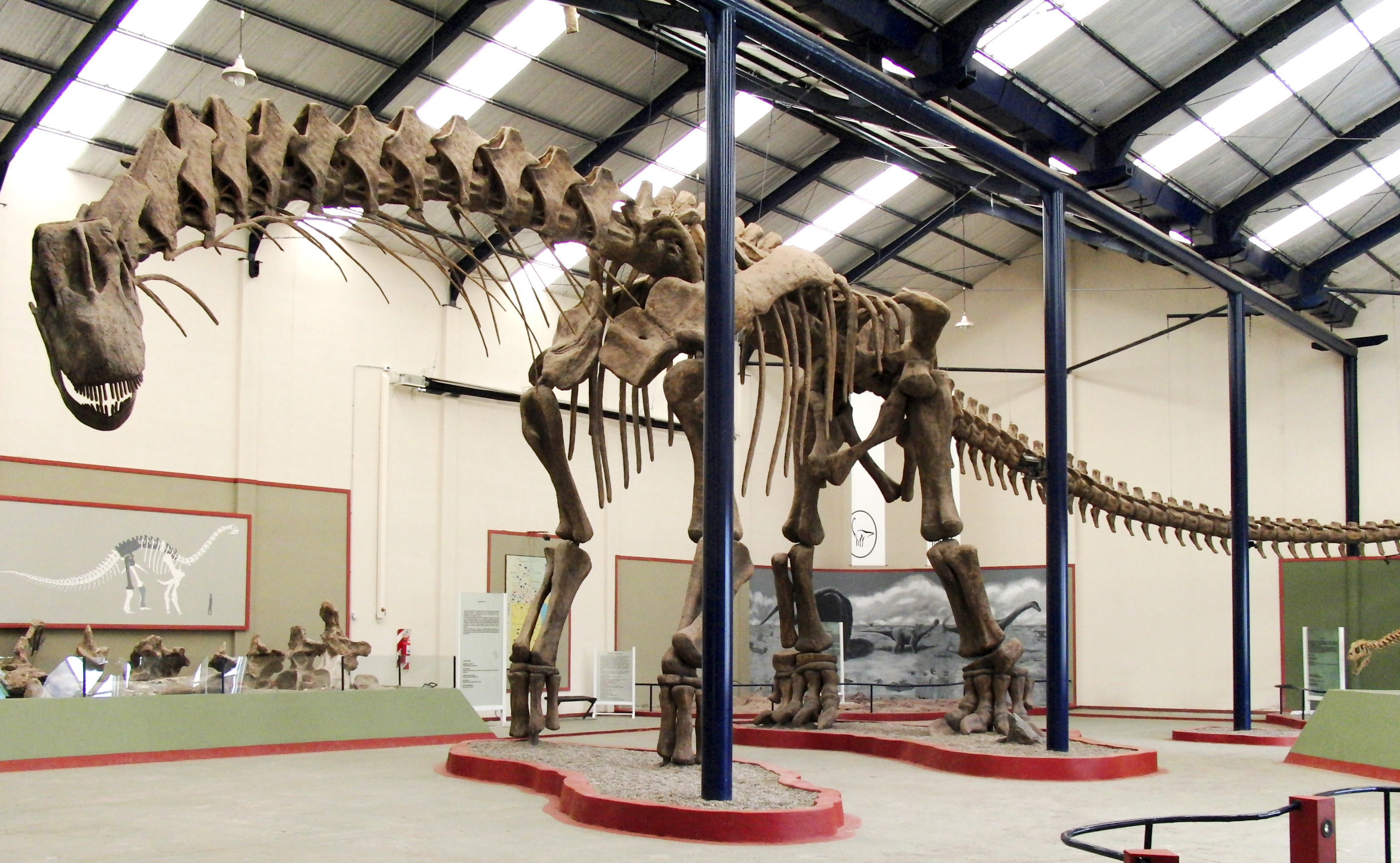
- Reconstructed skeleton, Museo Municipal Carmen Funes, Argentina. The original vertebrae are seen on the lower left

Scientific classification
- Kingdom: Animalia
- Phylum: Chordata
- Class: Reptilia
- Clade: Dinosauria
- Clade: Saurischia
- Clade: †Sauropodomorpha
- Clade: †Sauropoda
- Clade: †Eusauropoda
- Clade: †Macronaria
- Clade: †Titanosauria
- Family: †Argentinosauridae
- Genus: †Argentinosaurus; Bonaparte & Coria, 1993

Type species
- †Argentinosaurus huinculensis Bonaparte & Coria, 1993

= Argentinosaurus =

Argentinosaurus Temporal range: Early Cretaceous (Albian), ~106 Ma

Extinct genus of giant sauropod dinosaur

Argentinosaurus (meaning "lizard from Argentina") is a genus of giant sauropod dinosaur that lived during the Early Cretaceous period in what is now Argentina. Although it is only known from fragmentary remains, Argentinosaurus was one of the largest known land animals of all time, measuring 30–35 m (98–115 ft) long and weighing 65–80 t (72–88 short tons). It was a member of Titanosauria, the dominant group of sauropods during the Cretaceous.

The first Argentinosaurus bone was discovered in 1987 by a farmer on his farm near the city of Plaza Huincul. A scientific excavation of the site led by the Argentine palaeontologist José Bonaparte was conducted in 1989, yielding several back vertebrae and parts of a sacrum—fused vertebrae between the back and tail vertebrae. Additional specimens include a complete femur (thigh bone) and the shaft of another. Argentinosaurus was named by Bonaparte and the Argentine palaeontologist Rodolfo Coria in 1993; the genus contains a single species, A. huinculensis, after its place of discovery, Plaza Huincul.

The fragmentary nature of Argentinosaurus remains makes their interpretation difficult. Arguments revolve around the position of the recovered vertebrae within the vertebral column and the presence of accessory articulations between the vertebrae that would have strengthened the spine. A computer model of the skeleton and muscles estimated this dinosaur had a maximum speed of 7.2 km/h (5 mph) with a pace, a gait where the fore and hind limb of the same side of the body move simultaneously. The fossils of Argentinosaurus were recovered from the Huincul Formation, which was deposited in the Albian stage and contains a diverse dinosaur fauna, including the giant theropod Mapusaurus.

== Discovery ==
Skeletal reconstruction, holotype material in white, referred femoral shaft in green, referred femur in blue, unknown bones in grey

The first Argentinosaurus bone, which is now thought to be a fibula (calf bone), was discovered in 1987 by Guillermo Heredia on his farm "Las Overas" about 8 km (5 mi) east of Plaza Huincul, in Neuquén Province, Argentina. Heredia, initially believing he had discovered petrified logs, informed the local museum, the Museo Carmen Funes, whose staff members excavated the bone and stored it in the museum's exhibition room. In early 1989, the Argentine palaeontologist José F. Bonaparte initiated a larger excavation of the site involving palaeontologists of the Museo Argentino de Ciencias Naturales, yielding a number of additional elements from the same individual. The individual, which later became the holotype of Argentinosaurus huinculensis, is catalogued under the specimen number MCF-PVPH 1.

Separating fossils from the very hard rock in which the bones were encased required the use of pneumatic hammers. The additional material recovered included seven dorsal vertebrae (vertebrae of the back), the underside of the sacrum (fused vertebrae between the dorsal and tail vertebrae) including the first to fifth sacral vertebrae and some sacral ribs, and a part of a dorsal rib (rib from the flank). These finds were also incorporated into the collection of the Museo Carmen Funes.

Bonaparte presented the new find in 1989 at a scientific conference in San Juan. The formal description was published in 1993 by Bonaparte and the Argentine palaeontologist Rodolfo Coria, with the naming of a new genus and species, Argentinosaurus huinculensis. The generic name means "Argentine lizard", while the specific name refers to the town Plaza Huincul. Bonaparte and Coria described the limb bone discovered in 1987 as an eroded tibia (shin bone), although the Uruguayan palaeontologist Gerardo Mazzetta and colleagues reidentified this bone as a left fibula in 2004. In 1996, Bonaparte referred (assigned) a complete femur (thigh bone) from the same locality to the genus, which was put on exhibit at the Museo Carmen Funes. This bone was deformed by front-to-back crushing during fossilization. In their 2004 study, Mazzetta and colleagues mentioned an additional femur that is housed in the La Plata Museum under the specimen number MLP-DP 46-VIII-21-3. Though not as strongly deformed as the complete femur, it preserves only the shaft and lacks its upper and lower ends. Both specimens belonged to individuals equivalent in size to the holotype individual. As of 2019, however, it was still uncertain whether any of these femora belonged to Argentinosaurus.

== Description ==
=== Size ===
Size comparison of selected giant sauropod dinosaurs, Argentinosaurus in red and second from the left

Argentinosaurus is among the largest known land animals, although its exact size is difficult to estimate because of the incompleteness of its remains. To counter this problem, palaeontologists can compare the known material with that of smaller related sauropods known from more complete remains. The more complete taxon can then be scaled up to match the dimensions of Argentinosaurus. Mass can be estimated from known relationships between certain bone measurements and body mass, or through determining the volume of models.

A reconstruction of Argentinosaurus created by Gregory Paul in 1994 yielded a length estimate of 30–35 metres (98–115 ft). Later that year, estimates by Bonaparte and Coria suggesting a hind limb length of 4.5 metres (15 ft), a trunk length (hip to shoulder) of 7 metres (23 ft), and an overall body length of 30 metres (98 ft) were published. In 2006, Kenneth Carpenter reconstructed Argentinosaurus using the more complete Saltasaurus as a guide and estimated a length of 30 metres (98 ft). In 2008, Jorge Calvo and colleagues used the proportions of Futalognkosaurus to estimate the length of Argentinosaurus at less than 33 m (108 ft). In 2013, William Sellers and colleagues arrived at a length estimate of 39.7 metres (130 ft) and a shoulder height of 7.3 metres (24 ft) by measuring the skeletal mount in Museo Carmen Funes. During the same year, Scott Hartman suggested that because Argentinosaurus was then thought to be a basal titanosaur, it would have a shorter tail and narrower chest than Puertasaurus, which he estimated to be about 27 metres (89 ft) long, indicating Argentinosaurus was slightly smaller. In 2016, Paul estimated the length of Argentinosaurus at 30 m (98 ft), but later estimated a greater length of 35 metres (115 ft) or longer in 2019, restoring the unknown neck and tail of Argentinosaurus after those of other large South American titanosaurs.

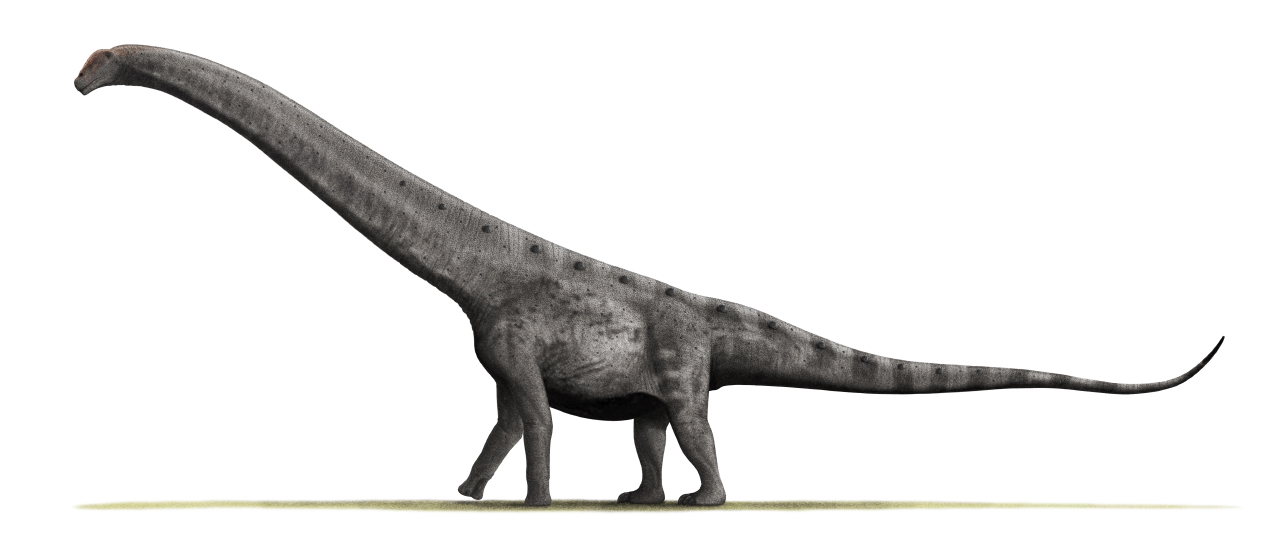
Hypothetical life restoration

Paul estimated a body mass of 80–100 tonnes (88–110 short tons) for Argentinosaurus in 1994. In 2004, Mazzetta and colleagues provided a range of 60–88 tonnes (66–97 short tons) and considered 73 tonnes (80 short tons) to be the most likely mass, making it the heaviest sauropod known from good material. In 2013, Sellers and colleagues estimated a mass of 83.2 tonnes (91.7 short tons) by calculating the volume of the aforementioned Museo Carmen Funes skeleton. In 2014 and 2018, Roger Benson and colleagues estimated the mass of Argentinosaurus at 90 and 95 tonnes (99 and 105 short tons), but these estimates were questioned due to a very large error range and lack of precision. In 2016, using equations that estimate body mass based on the circumference of the humerus and femur of quadrupedal animals, Bernardo Gonzáles Riga and colleagues estimated a mass of 96.4 tonnes (106.3 short tons) based on an isolated femur; it is uncertain whether this femur actually belongs to Argentinosaurus. In the same year, Paul moderated his earlier estimate from 1994 and listed the body mass of Argentinosaurus at more than 50 tonnes (55 short tons). In 2019, Paul moderated his 2016 estimate and gave a mass estimate of 65–75 tonnes (72–83 short tons) based on his skeletal reconstructions (diagrams illustrating the bones and shape of an animal) of Argentinosaurus in dorsal and lateral view. In 2020, Campione and Evans also yielded a body mass estimate of approximately 75 tonnes (83 short tons). In 2023, Paul and Larramendi proposed that the holotype would have weighed between 75–80 metric tons (83–88 short tons) at maximum. They further suggested that the enigmatic, fragmentary Bruhathkayosaurus possibly weighed more, between 110 and 130 tonnes (120 and 140 short tons).

While Argentinosaurus was definitely a massive animal, there is disagreement over whether it was the largest known titanosaur. Puertasaurus, Futalognkosaurus, Dreadnoughtus, Paralititan, "Antarctosaurus" giganteus, and Alamosaurus have all been considered to be comparable in size with Argentinosaurus by some studies, although others have found them to be notably smaller. In 2017, Carballido and colleagues considered Argentinosaurus to be smaller than Patagotitan, since the latter had a greater area enclosed by the neural spine, diapophyses, and parapophyses of its anterior dorsal vertebrae. However, Paul found Patagotitan to be smaller than Argentinosaurus in 2019, due to the latter's dorsal column being considerably longer. Even if Argentinosaurus was the largest-known titanosaur, other sauropods including Maraapunisaurus and a giant mamenchisaurid, may have been larger, although these are only known from very scant remains. Some diplodocids, such as Supersaurus and Diplodocus may have exceeded Argentinosaurus in length despite being considerably less massive. The mass of the blue whale, however, which can be greater than 150 tonnes (170 short tons), still exceeds that of all known sauropods.

=== Vertebrae ===
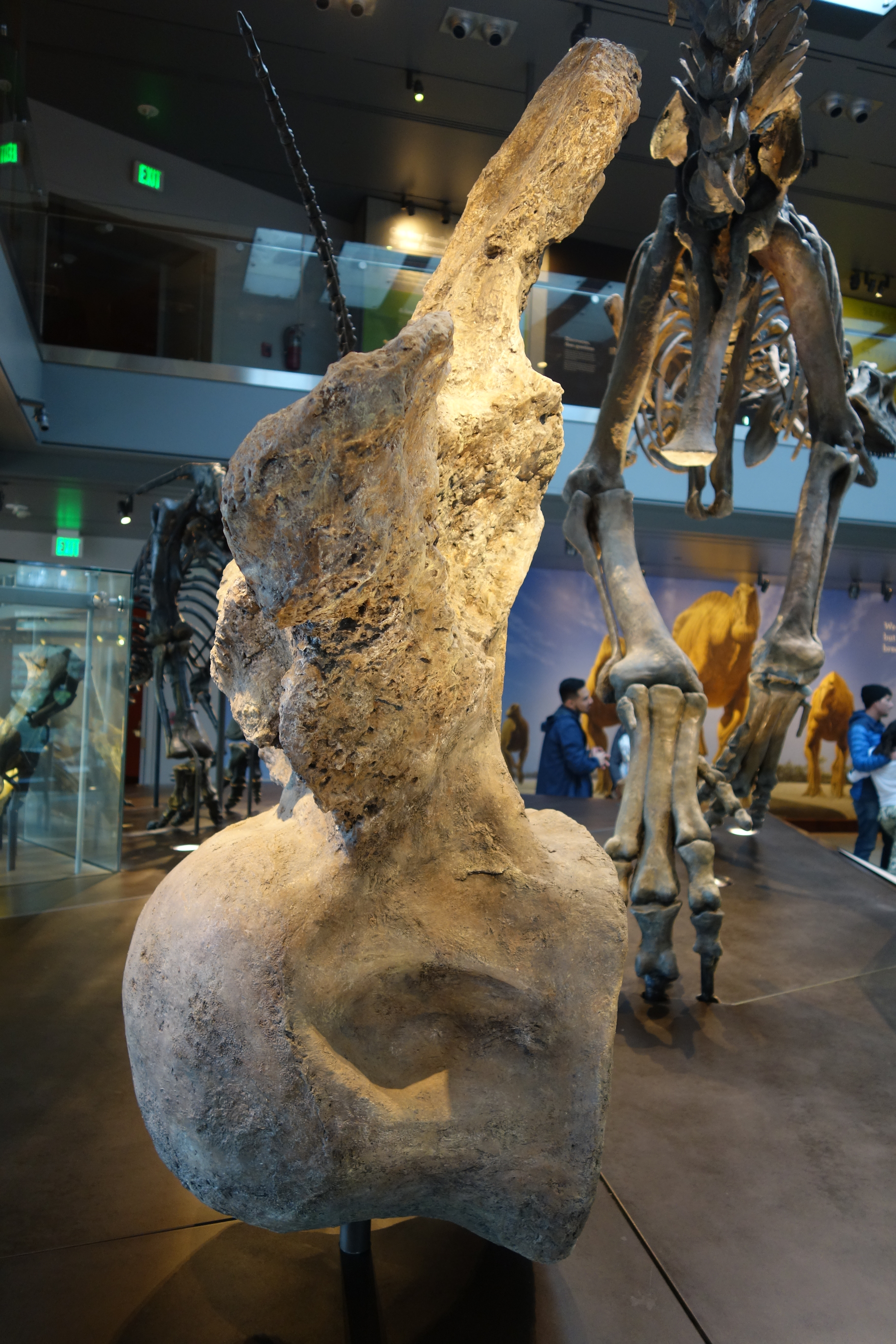
Dorsal vertebra cast in left side view at the Natural History Museum of Los Angeles County

Argentinosaurus likely possessed 10 dorsal vertebrae, like other titanosaurs. The vertebrae were enormous even for sauropods; one dorsal vertebra has a reconstructed height of 159 centimetres (63 in) and a width of 129 centimetres (51 in), and the vertebral centra are up to 57 centimetres (22 in) in width. In 2019, Paul estimated the total length of the dorsal vertebral column at 447 centimetres (176 in) and the width of the pelvis at 0.6 times the combined length of the dorsal and sacral vertebral column. The dorsals were opisthocoelous (concave at the rear) as in other macronarian sauropods. The pleurocoels (excavations on the sides of the centra) were proportionally small and positioned in the front half of the centrum. The vertebrae were internally lightened by a complex pattern of numerous air-filled chambers. Such camellate bone is, among sauropods, especially pronounced in the largest and longest-necked species. In both the dorsal and sacral vertebrae, very large cavities measuring 4 to 6 centimetres (1.6 to 2.4 in) were present. The dorsal ribs were tubular and cylindrical in shape, in contrast with other titanosaurs. Bonaparte and Coria, in their 1993 description, noted the ribs were hollow, unlike those of many other sauropods, but later authors argued this hollowing could also have been due to erosion after the death of the individual. Argentinosaurus, like many titanosaurs, probably had six sacral vertebrae (those in the hip region), although the last one is not preserved. The centra of the second to fifth sacral vertebrae were much reduced in size and considerably smaller than the centrum of the first sacral. The sacral ribs curved downwards. The second sacral rib was larger than the other preserved sacral ribs, though the size of the first is unknown due to its incompleteness.

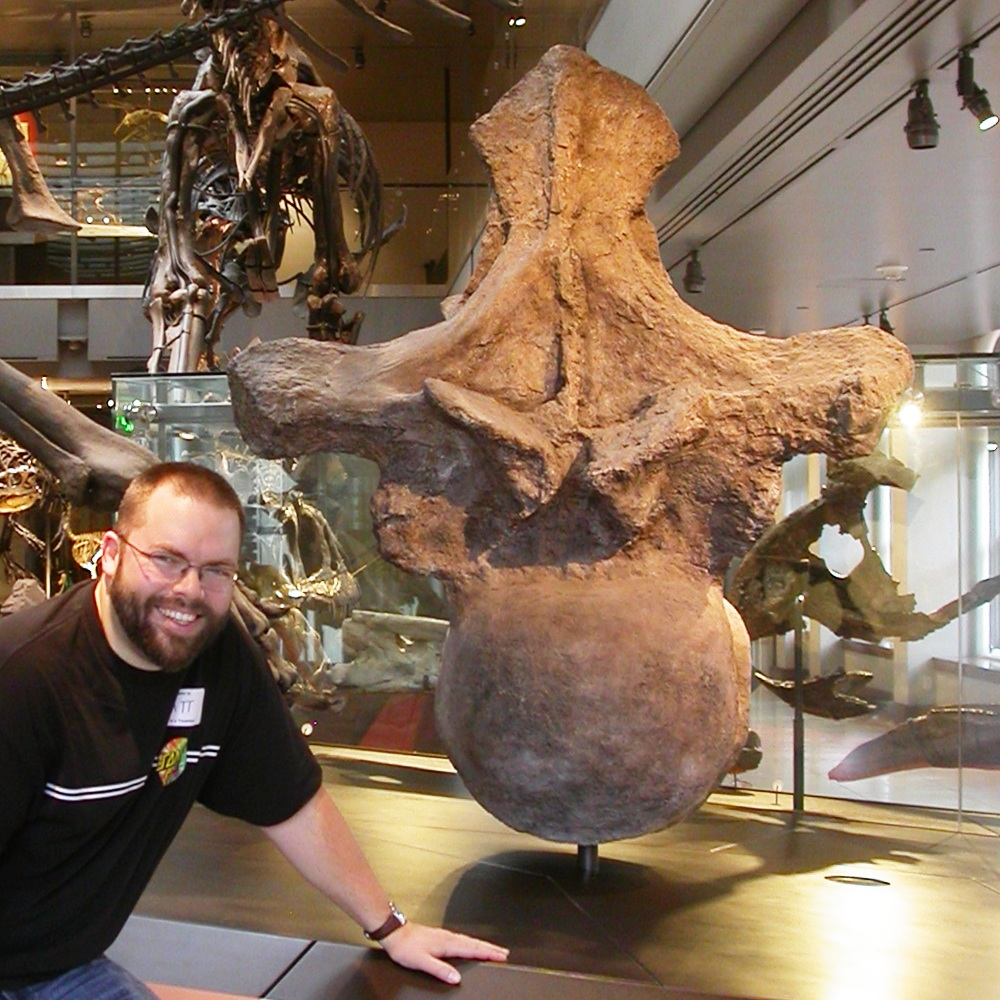
Dorsal vertebra cast in front view at the Natural History Museum of Los Angeles County, with the palaeontologist Matthew Wedel for scale

Because of their incomplete preservation, the original position of the known dorsal vertebrae within the vertebral column is disputed. Dissenting configurations were suggested by Bonaparte and Coria in 1993; Fernando Novas and Martín Ezcurra in 2006; and Leonardo Salgado and Jaime Powell in 2010. One vertebra was interpreted by these studies as the first, fifth or third; and another vertebra as the second, tenth or eleventh, or ninth, respectively. A reasonably complete vertebra was found to be the third by the 1993 and 2006 studies, but the fourth by the 2010 study. Another vertebra was interpreted by the three studies as being part of the rear section of the dorsal vertebral column, as the fourth, or as the fifth, respectively. In 1993, two articulated (still connected) vertebrae were thought to be of the rear part of the dorsal column but are interpreted as the sixth and seventh vertebrae in the two later studies. The 2010 study mentioned another vertebra that was not mentioned by the 1993 and 2006 studies; it was presumed to belong to the rear part of the dorsal column.

Another contentious issue is the presence of hyposphene-hypantrum articulations, accessory joints between vertebrae that were located below the main articular processes. Difficulties in interpretation arise from the fragmentary preservation of the vertebral column; these joints are hidden from view in the two connected vertebrae. In 1993, Bonaparte and Coria said the hyposphene-hypantrum articulations were enlarged, as in the related Epachthosaurus, and had additional articular surfaces that extended downwards. This was confirmed by some later authors; Novas noted the hypantrum (a bony extension below the articular processes of the front face of a vertebra) extended sidewards and downwards, forming a much-broadened surface that connected with the equally enlarged hyposphene at the back face of the following vertebra. In 1996, Bonaparte stated these features would have made the spine more rigid and were possibly an adaptation to the giant size of the animal. Other authors argued most titanosaur genera lacked hyposphene-hypantrum articulations and that the articular structures seen in Epachthosaurus and Argentinosaurus are thickened vertebral laminae (ridges). Sebastián Apesteguía, in 2005, argued the structures seen in Argentinosaurus, which he termed hyposphenal bars, are indeed thickened laminae that could have been derived from the original hyposphene and had the same function.

=== Limbs ===
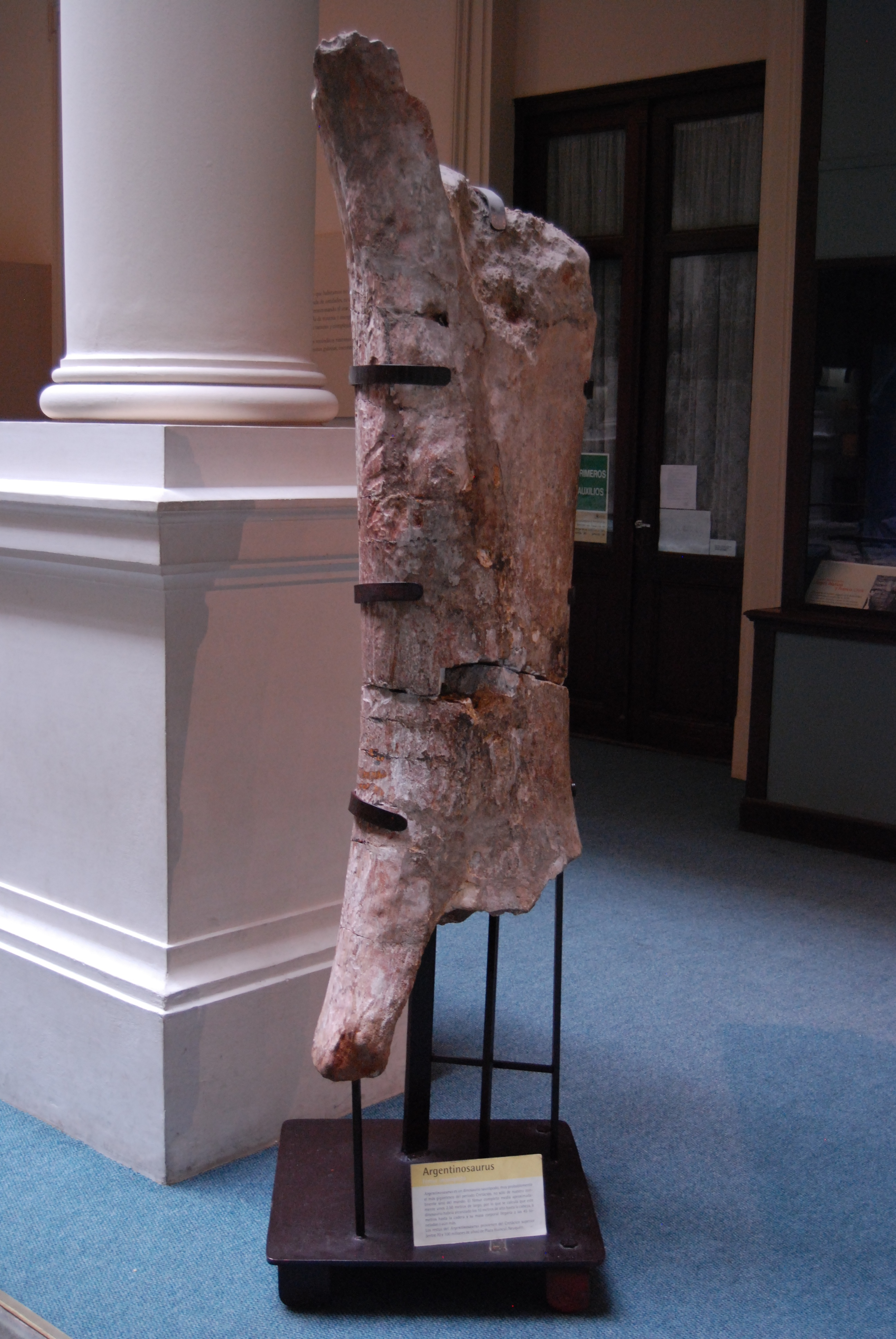
Assigned femur (upper thigh bone), Museo de La Plata

The complete femur that was assigned to Argentinosaurus is 2.5 metres (8.2 ft) long. The femoral shaft has a circumference of about 1.18 metres (3.9 ft) at its narrowest part. Mazzetta and colleagues used regression equations to estimate its original length at 2.557 metres (8.39 ft), which is similar to the length of the other femur, and later in 2019 Paul gave a similar estimate of 2.575 metres (8.45 ft). By comparison, the complete femora preserved in the other giant titanosaurs Antarctosaurus giganteus and Patagotitan mayorum measure 2.35 metres (7.7 ft) and 2.38 metres (7.8 ft), respectively. While the holotype specimen does not preserve a femur, it preserves a slender fibula (originally interpreted as a tibia) that is 1.55 metres (5.1 ft) in length. When it was identified as a tibia, it was thought to have a comparatively short cnemial crest, a prominent extension at the upper front that anchored muscles for stretching the leg. However, as stated by Mazzetta and colleagues, this bone lacks both the proportions and anatomical details of a tibia, while being similar in shape to other sauropod fibulae.

== Classification ==
Relationships within Titanosauria are amongst the least understood of all groups of dinosaurs. Traditionally, the majority of sauropod fossils from the Cretaceous had been referred to a single family, the Titanosauridae, which has been in use since 1893. In their 1993 first description of Argentinosaurus, Bonaparte and Coria noted it differed from typical titanosaurids in having hyposphene-hypantrum articulations. As these articulations were also present in the titanosaurids Andesaurus and Epachthosaurus, Bonaparte and Coria proposed a separate family for the three genera, the Andesauridae. Both families were united into a new, higher group called Titanosauria.

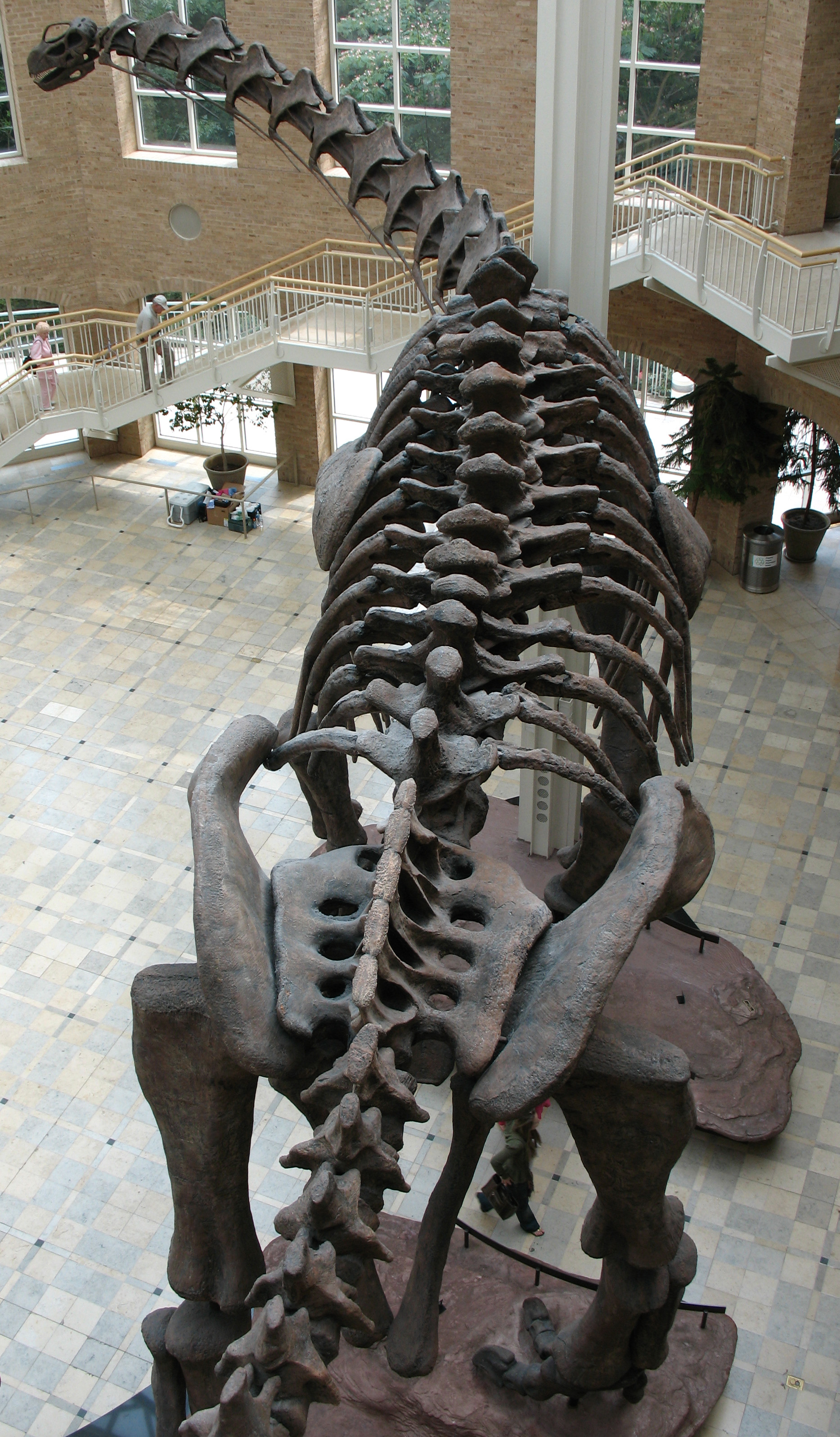
Skeletal reconstruction in dorsal view, at the Fernbank Museum of Natural History

In 1997, Salgado and colleagues found Argentinosaurus to belong to Titanosauridae in an unnamed clade with Opisthocoelicaudia and an indeterminate titanosaur. In 2002, Davide Pisani and colleagues recovered Argentinosaurus as a member of Titanosauria, and again found it to be in a clade with Opisthocoelicaudia and an unnamed taxon, in addition to Lirainosaurus. A 2003 study by Jeffrey Wilson and Paul Upchurch found both Titanosauridae and Andesauridae to be invalid; the Titanosauridae because it was based on the dubious genus Titanosaurus and the Andesauridae because it was defined on plesiomorphies (primitive features) rather than on synapomorphies (newly evolved features that distinguish the group from related groups). A 2011 study by Philip Mannion and Calvo found Andesauridae to be paraphyletic (excluding some of the group's descendants) and likewise recommended its disuse.

In 2004, Upchurch and colleagues introduced a new group called Lithostrotia that included the more derived (evolved) members of Titanosauria. Argentinosaurus was classified outside this group and thus as a more basal ("primitive") titanosaurian. The basal position within Titanosauria was confirmed by a number of subsequent studies. In 2007, Calvo and colleagues named Futalognkosaurus; they found it to form a clade with Mendozasaurus and named it Lognkosauria. A 2017 study by Carballido and colleagues recovered Argentinosaurus as a member of Lognkosauria and the sister taxon of Patagotitan. In 2018, González Riga and colleagues also found it to belong in Lognkosauria, which in turn was found to belong to Lithostrotia.

Another 2018 study by Hesham Sallam and colleagues found two different phylogenetic positions for Argentinosaurus based on two data sets. They did not recover it as a lognkosaurian but as either a basal titanosaur or a sister taxon of the more derived Epachthosaurus. In 2019, Julian Silva Junior and colleagues found Argentinosaurus to belong to Lognkosauria once again; they recovered Lognkosauria and Rinconsauria (another group generally included in Titanosauria) to be outside Titanosauria. Another 2019 study by González Riga and colleagues also found Argentinosaurus to belong to Lognkosauria; they found this group to form a larger clade with Rinconsauria within Titanosauria, which they named Colossosauria.

Topology according to Carballido and colleagues, 2017.

- - Rinconsauria
    - Rinconsaurus
    - - Muyelensaurus
      - - Aeolosaurus
        - Overosaurus
  - - Bonitasaura
    - - Notocolossus
      - Lognkosauria
        - Mendozasaurus
        - - - Futalognkosaurus
            - Quetecsaurus
          - - Puertasaurus
            - Drusilasaura
            - - Patagotitan
              - Argentinosaurus

Topology according to González Riga and colleagues, 2019.

- Colossosauria
  - Rinconsauria
    - Rinconsaurus
    - Muyelensaurus
  - Lognkosauria
    - Mendozasaurus
    - - Futalognkosaurus
      - - Argentinosaurus
        - - Notocolossus
          - Patagotitan
          - Puertasaurus

== Palaeobiology ==
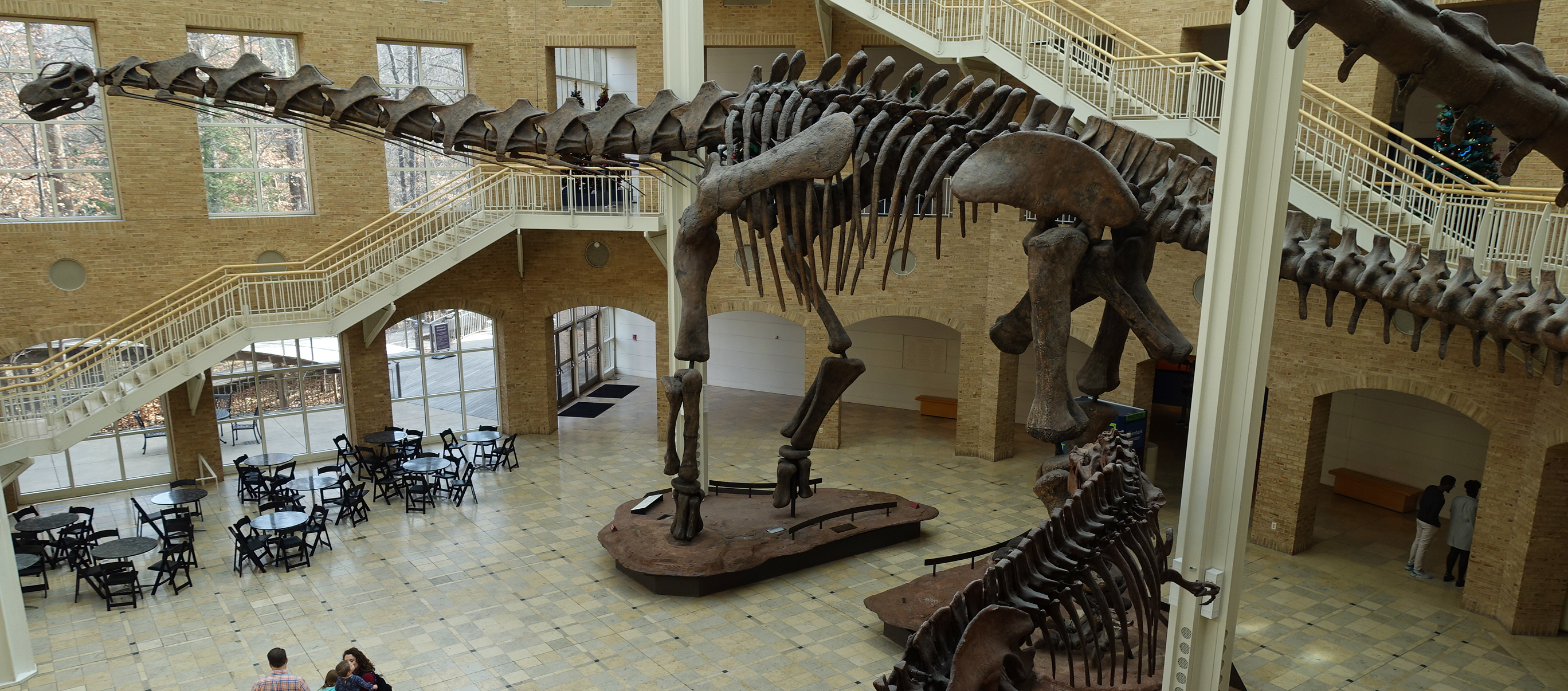
Reconstructed skeleton in side view, Fernbank Museum of Natural History

The giant size of Argentinosaurus and other sauropods was likely made possible by a combination of factors; these include fast and energy-efficient feeding allowed for by the long neck and lack of mastication, fast growth and fast population recovery due to their many small offspring. Advantages of giant sizes would likely have included the ability to keep food inside the digestive tract for lengthy periods to extract a maximum of energy, and increased protection against predators. Sauropods were oviparous (egg-laying). In 2016, Mark Hallett and Matthew Wedel stated that the eggs of Argentinosaurus were probably only 1 litre (0.26 US gal) in volume, and that a hatched Argentinosaurus was no longer than 1 metre (3.3 ft) and not heavier than 5 kilograms (11 lb). The largest sauropods increased their size by five orders of magnitude after hatching, more than in any other amniote animals. Hallett and Wedel estimated that Argentinosaurus reached sexual maturity at 8–10 years and physical maturity at 20 years, with a lifespan estimated at 30 years. Hallett and Wedel argued size increases in the evolution of sauropods were commonly followed by size increases of their predators, theropod dinosaurs. Argentinosaurus might have been preyed on by Mapusaurus, which is among the largest theropods known. Mapusaurus is known from at least seven individuals found together, raising the possibility that this theropod hunted in packs to bring down large prey including Argentinosaurus.

A video showing Argentinosaurus walking as estimated by computer simulations from a 2013 study

In 2013, Sellers and colleagues used a computer model of the skeleton and muscles of Argentinosaurus to study its speed and gait. Before computer simulations, the only way of estimating speeds of dinosaurs was through studying anatomy and trackways. The computer model was based on a laser scan of a mounted skeletal reconstruction on display at the Museo Carmen Funes. Muscles and their properties were based on comparisons with living animals; the final model had a mass of 83 tonnes (91 short tons). Using computer simulation and machine learning techniques, which found a combination of movements that minimised energy requirements, the digital Argentinosaurus learned to walk. The optimal gait found by the algorithms was close to a pace (forelimb and hind limb on the same side of the body move simultaneously). The model reached a top speed of just over 2 m/s (7.2 km/h, 5 mph). The authors concluded with its giant size, Argentinosaurus reached a functional limit. Much larger terrestrial vertebrates might be possible but would require different body shapes and possibly behavioural change to prevent joint collapse. The authors of the study cautioned the model is not fully realistic and too simplistic, and that it could be improved in many areas. For further studies, more data from living animals is needed to improve the soft tissue reconstruction, and the model needs to be confirmed based on more complete sauropod specimens. A 2025 study estimated that Argentinosaurus may have walked at a speed of 1.58 meters per second (5.7 km/h; 3.5 mph).

== Palaeoenvironment ==
Size comparison of several dinosaurs from the Huincul Formation, Argentinosaurus in blue

Argentinosaurus was discovered in the Argentine Province of Neuquén. It was originally reported from the Huincul Group of the Río Limay Formation, which have since become known as the Huincul Formation and the Río Limay Subgroup, the latter of which is a subdivision of the Neuquén Group. This unit is located in the Neuquén Basin in Patagonia. The Huincul Formation is composed of yellowish and greenish sandstones of fine-to-medium grain, some of which are tuffaceous. According to a 2026 study, these deposits were laid down during the Albian age of the Early Cretaceous. Earlier findings suggested a Cenomanian–Turonian age, or possibly an early Turonian to late Santonian age. The deposits represent the drainage system of a braided river.

Fossilised pollen indicates a wide variety of plants were present in the Huincul Formation. A study of the El Zampal section of the formation found hornworts, liverworts, ferns, Selaginellales, possible Noeggerathiales, gymnosperms (including gnetophytes and conifers), and angiosperms (flowering plants), in addition to several pollen grains of unknown affinities. The Huincul Formation is among the richest Patagonian vertebrate associations, preserving fish including dipnoans and gar, chelid turtles, squamates, sphenodonts, neosuchian crocodilians, and a wide variety of dinosaurs. Vertebrates are most commonly found in the lower, and therefore older, part of the formation.

In addition to Argentinosaurus, the sauropods of the Huincul Formation are represented by another titanosaur, Choconsaurus, and several rebbachisaurids including Cathartesaura, Limaysaurus, and some unnamed species. Theropods including carcharodontosaurids such as Mapusaurus, abelisaurids including Skorpiovenator, Ilokelesia, and Tralkasaurus, noasaurids such as Huinculsaurus, paravians such as Overoraptor, and other theropods such as Aoniraptor and Gualicho have also been discovered there. Several iguanodonts are also present in the Huincul Formation.
