= Paleontology in Finland =

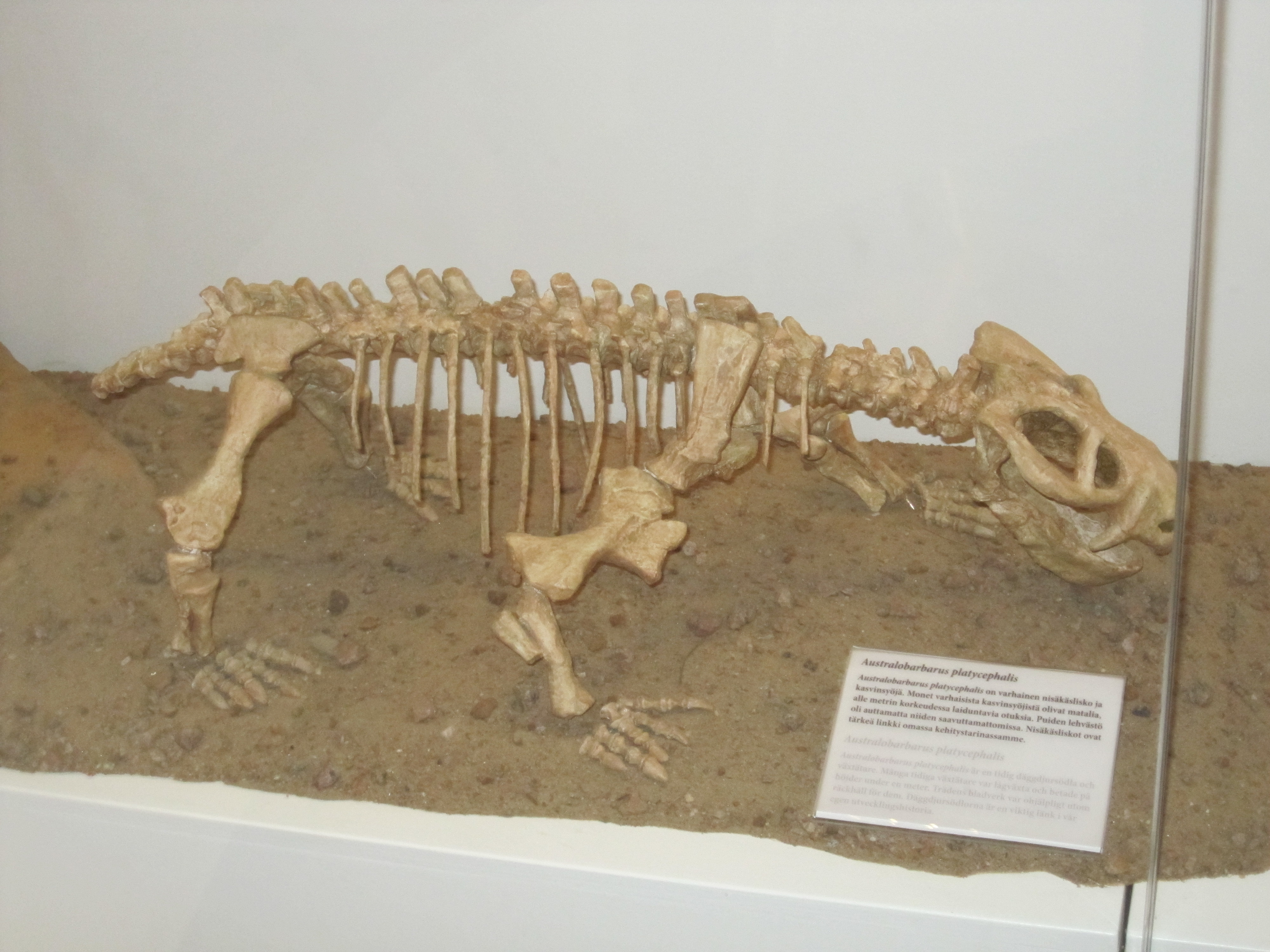
A fossil of an extinct therapsid Australobarbarus at the Natural History Museum of Helsinki

Finland has relatively few fossils due to glacial erosion scouring away fossilferous layers. There are Precambrian fossils in Archean and Proterozoic layers from ancient soils, and three layers such as siltsones, mudstones and sandstones at 1650 million years old. In 2016, a fragmentary humerus of a fossil proboscidean (elephant relative), likely Deinotherium, were reported from glacial erratic deposits in southern Finland of likely Miocene age. In Pleistocene deposits, remains of woolly mammoth and woolly rhinoceros have been discovered.

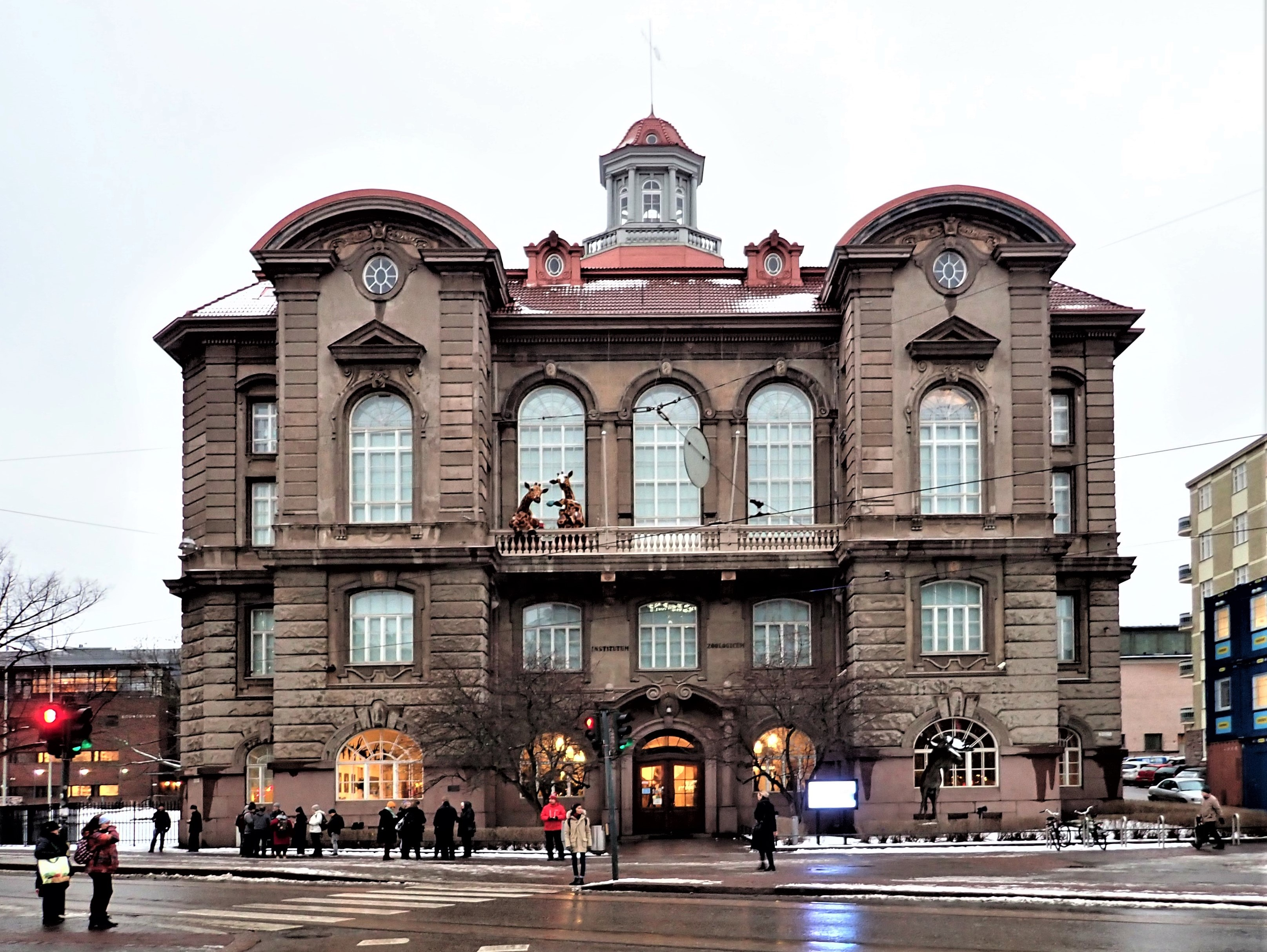
The Natural History Museum of Helsinki of the Finnish Museum of Natural History in 2018

The paleontological collections at the University of Helsinki (which houses the Finnish Museum of Natural History) consist of around 20,000 plant and animal fossils. These include Paleozoic invertebrates from the Åland Islands, Cenozoic carnivores, perissodactyls, fossilized microbial remains, and plant fossils, along with remains of cave bears, cave lions, and hyenas collected near Odessa, Ukraine. Notable contributors to the collections include Alexander von Nordmann (Cenozoic fossils), Ann Forstén (Perissodactyls fossils), and Björn Kurtén (Cenozoic carnivore fossils).

The Neogene of the Old World, a database of fossil mammals, is housed at the University of Helsinki. The database contains information on Cenozoic land mammal taxa and localities. The Tampere Mineral Museum at the Vapriikki Museum Centre also contains some fossils.

== Notable people ==
- Alexander von Nordmann (1803–1866), a Finnish biologist who contributed to zoology, parasitology, botany and paleontology
- Ann Forstén (1939–2002), a Finnish paleontologist known for her work on horse fossils
- Björn Kurtén (1924–1988), a Finnish vertebrate paleontologist and writer
- Marjatta Aalto (born 1939), a Finnish botanist and mycologist known for her work in paleobotany, ethnobotany, and archaeobotany
- Mikael Fortelius (born 1954), a Finnish professor of evolutionary palaeontology and the coordinator of the Neogene of the Old World database
- Jukka Jernvall (born 1963), a Finnish evolutionary biologist

== See also ==
- Geology of Finland
- Suomen paleontologinen seura BKK ry / The Paleontological Society of Finland BKK
