= Välikangas =

Välikangas or Wälikangas is a Finnish surname. Notable persons with the surname include:

- Eino Wälikangas (1889–1960), Finnish diplomat
- Ilmari Välikangas (1884–1959), Finnish hydrobiologist
- Martti Välikangas (1893–1973), Finnish architect
