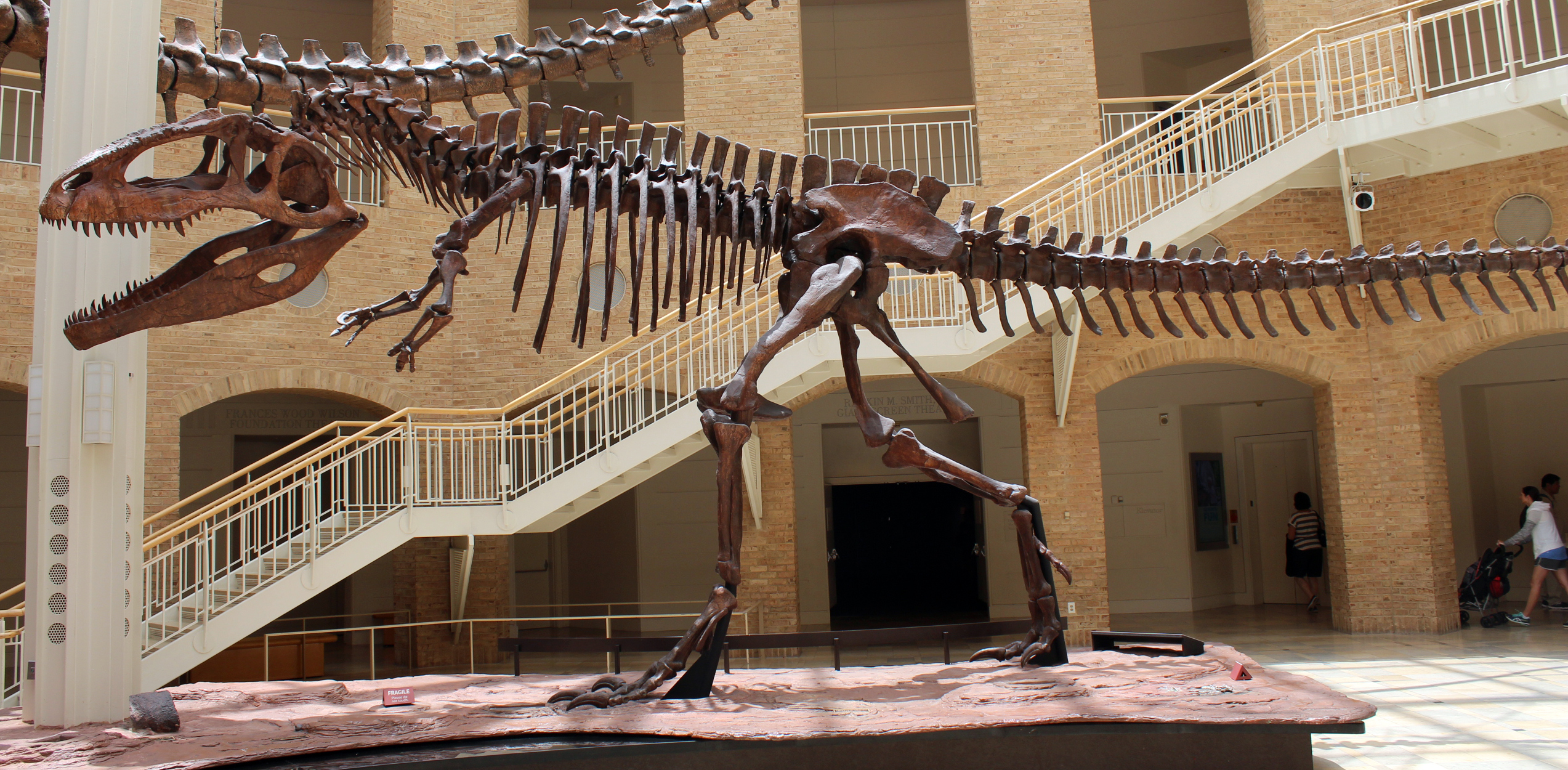
- Reconstructed skeleton (the skull is possibly too long), Fernbank Museum of Natural History

Scientific classification
- Kingdom: Animalia
- Phylum: Chordata
- Class: Reptilia
- Clade: Dinosauria
- Clade: Saurischia
- Clade: Theropoda
- Family: †Carcharodontosauridae
- Tribe: †Giganotosaurini
- Genus: †Giganotosaurus; Coria & Salgado, 1995
- Species: †G. carolinii

Binomial name
- †Giganotosaurus carolinii Coria & Salgado, 1995

= Giganotosaurus =

Giganotosaurus Temporal range: Early Cretaceous (early Albian), 111–106 Ma

Carcharodontosaurid dinosaur genus from the Cretaceous period

Giganotosaurus (/ˌɡɪɡəˌnoʊtəˈsɔːrəs/ GIG-ə-NOH-tə-SOR-əs) is a genus of large theropod dinosaur that lived in what is now Argentina, during the Albian age of the Early Cretaceous period, approximately 111 to 106 million years ago. The holotype specimen was discovered in the Candeleros Formation of Patagonia in 1993 and is almost 70% complete. The animal was named Giganotosaurus carolinii in 1995; the genus name translates to "giant southern lizard", and the specific name honors the discoverer, Ruben Carolini. A dentary bone, a tooth, and some tracks, discovered before the holotype, were later assigned to this animal. The genus attracted much interest and became part of a scientific debate about the maximum sizes of theropod dinosaurs.

Giganotosaurus was one of the largest known terrestrial carnivores, but the exact size has been hard to determine due to the incompleteness of the remains found so far. Estimates for the most complete specimen range from a length of 12 to 13 m (39 to 43 ft), a skull 1.53 to 1.80 m (5.0 to 5.9 ft) in length, and a weight of 4.2 to 13.8 t (4.6 to 15.2 short tons). The dentary bone that belonged to a supposedly larger individual has been used to extrapolate a length of 13.2 m (43 ft). Some researchers have found the animal to be larger than Tyrannosaurus, which has historically been considered the largest theropod, while others have found them to be roughly equal in size and the largest size estimates for Giganotosaurus exaggerated. The skull was low, with rugose (rough and wrinkled) nasal bones and a ridge-like crest on the lacrimal bone in front of the eye. The front of the lower jaw was flattened and had a downward-projecting process (or "chin") at the tip. The teeth were compressed sideways and had serrations. The neck was strong and the pectoral girdle proportionally small.

Part of the family Carcharodontosauridae, Giganotosaurus is one of the most completely known members of the group, which includes other very large theropods, such as the closely related Mapusaurus, Tyrannotitan and Carcharodontosaurus. Giganotosaurus is thought to have been homeothermic (a type of "warm-bloodedness"), with a metabolism between that of a mammal and a reptile, which would have enabled fast growth. It would have been capable of closing its jaws quickly, capturing and bringing down prey by delivering powerful bites. The "chin" may have helped in resisting stress when a bite was delivered against prey. Giganotosaurus is thought to have been the apex predator of its ecosystem, and it may have fed on juvenile sauropod dinosaurs.

== Discovery ==
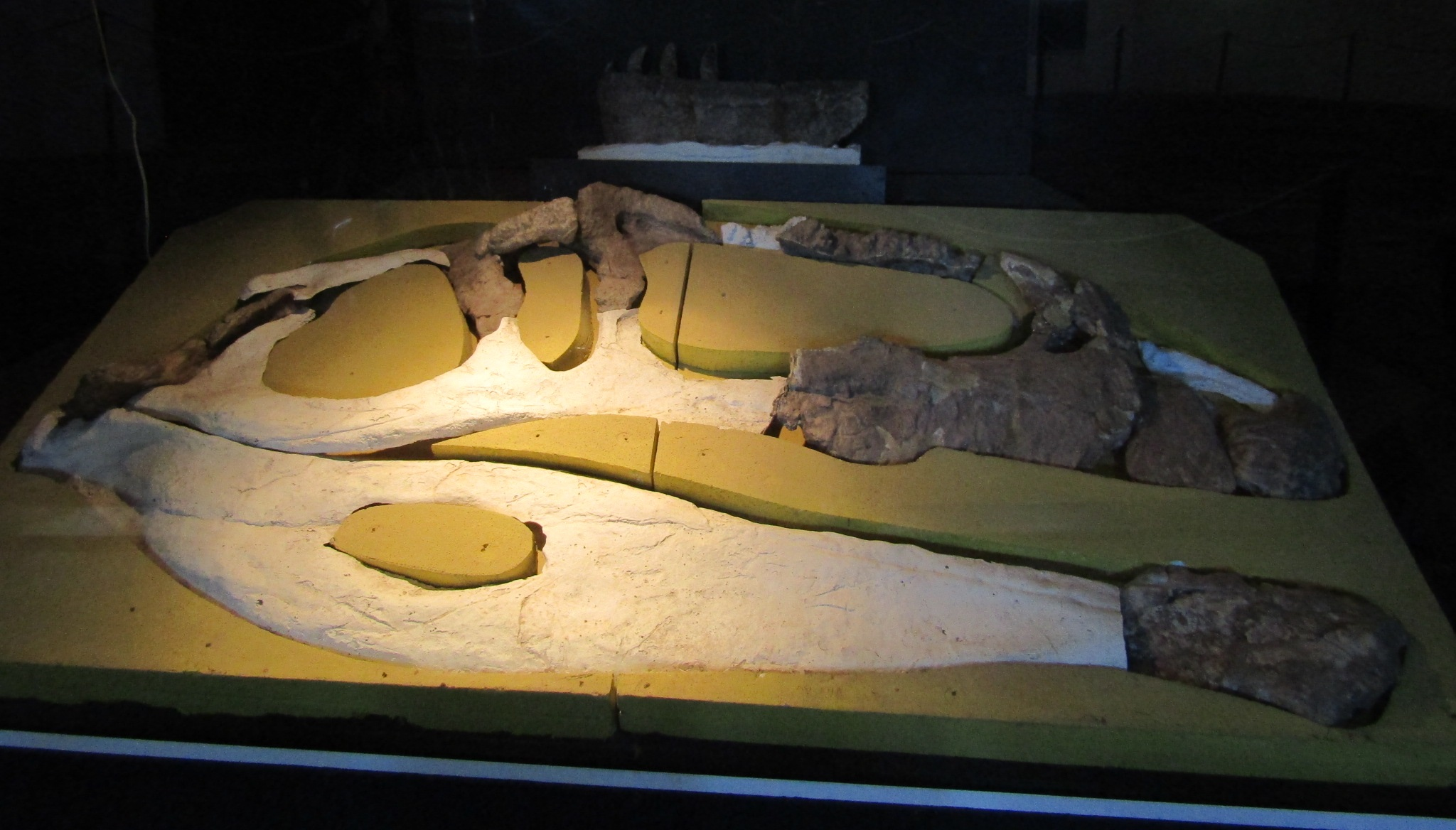
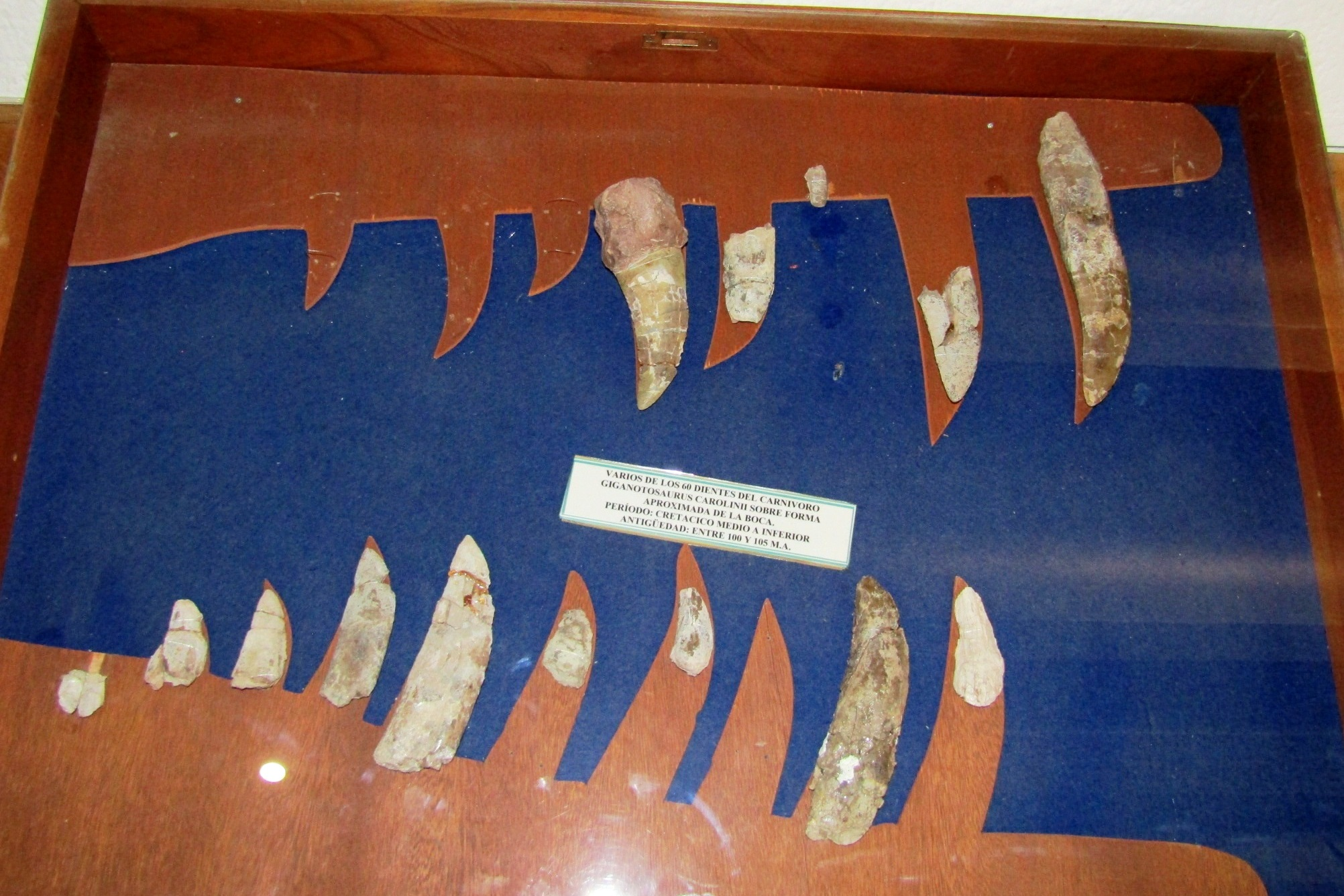
Partial holotype skull (above, white parts are reconstructed) and teeth, Ernesto Bachmann Paleontological Museum

In 1993, the amateur Argentine fossil hunter Rubén Darío Carolini discovered the tibia (lower leg bone) of a theropod dinosaur while driving a dune buggy in the badlands near Villa El Chocón, in the Neuquén province of Patagonia, Argentina. Specialists from the National University of Comahue were sent to excavate the specimen after being notified of the find. The discovery was announced by the paleontologists Rodolfo Coria and Leonardo Salgado at a Society of Vertebrate Paleontology meeting in 1994, where science writer Don Lessem offered to fund the excavation, after having been impressed by a photo of the leg-bone. The partial skull was scattered over an area of about 10 m^{2} (110 sq ft), and the postcranial skeleton was disarticulated. The specimen preserved almost 70% of the skeleton, and included most of the vertebral column, the pectoral and pelvic girdles, the femora, and the left tibia and fibula.

In 1995, this specimen was preliminarily described by Coria and Salgado, who made it the holotype of the new genus and species Giganotosaurus carolinii (parts of the skeleton were still encased in plaster at this time). The generic name is derived from the Ancient Greek words gigas/γίγας (meaning "giant"), notos/νότος (meaning "austral/southern", in reference to its provenance) and -sauros/-σαύρος (meaning "lizard"). The specific name honors Carolini, the discoverer. The holotype skeleton is now housed in the Ernesto Bachmann Paleontological Museum (where it is catalogued as specimen MUCPv-Ch1) in Villa El Chocón, which was inaugurated in 1995 at the request of Carolini. The specimen is the main exhibition at the museum, and is placed on the sandy floor of a room devoted to the animal, along with tools used by paleontologists during the excavation. A mounted reconstruction of the skeleton is exhibited in an adjacent room.

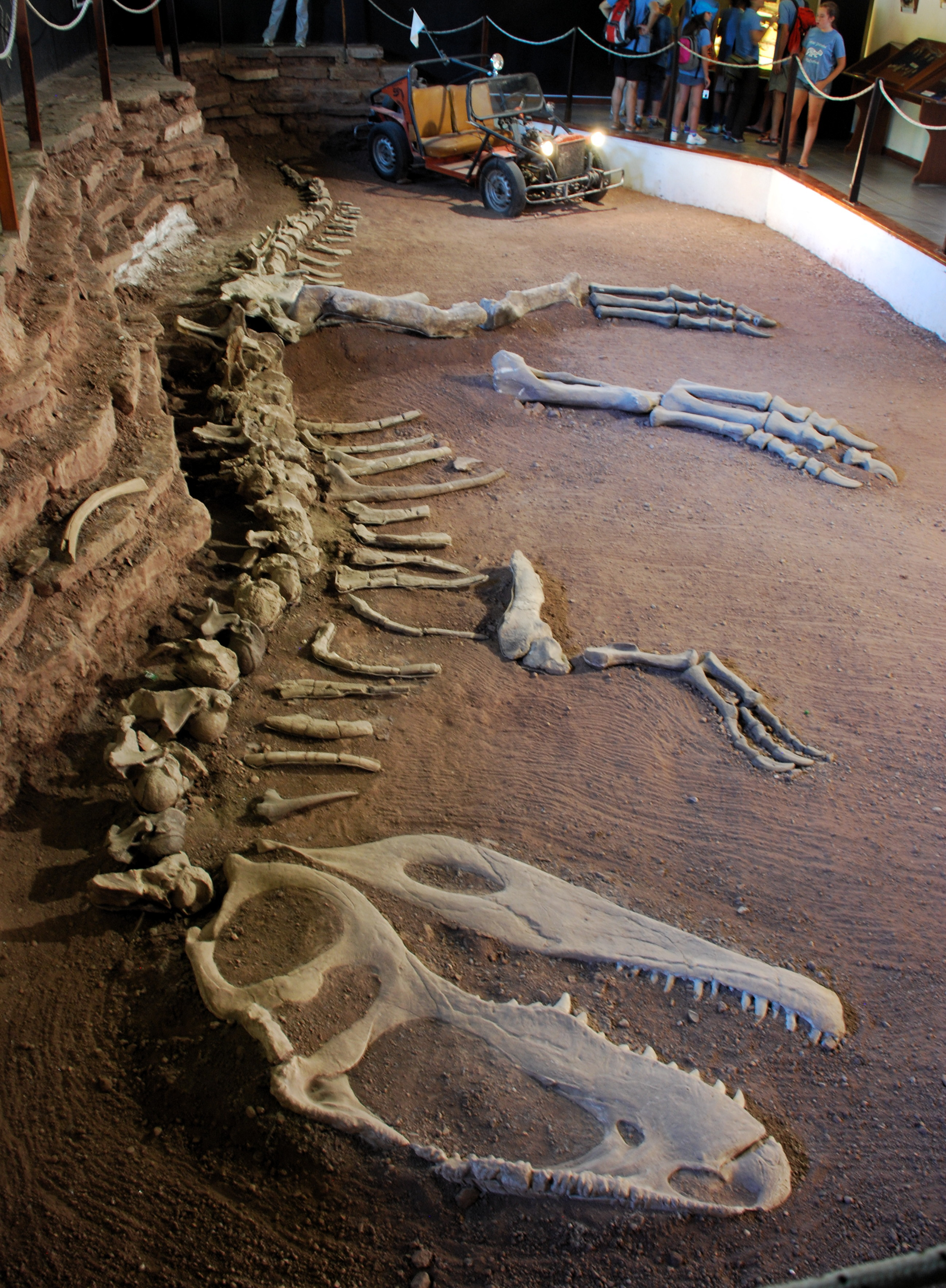
Holotype skeleton with reconstructed skull, arm, and feet, on the floor in EBPM

One of the features of theropod dinosaurs that has attracted most scientific interest is the fact that the group includes the largest terrestrial predators of the Mesozoic Era. This interest began with the discovery of one of the first known dinosaurs, Megalosaurus, named in 1824 for its large size. More than half a century later in 1905, Tyrannosaurus was named, and it remained the largest known theropod dinosaur for 90 years, though other large theropods were also known. The discussion of which theropod was the largest was revived in the 1990s by new discoveries in Africa and South America. In their original description, Coria and Salgado considered Giganotosaurus at least the largest theropod dinosaur from the Southern Hemisphere, and perhaps the largest in the world. They conceded that comparison with Tyrannosaurus was difficult due to the disarticulated state of the cranial bones of Giganotosaurus, but noted that at 1.43 m (4.7 ft), the femur of Giganotosaurus was 5 cm (2 in) longer than that of "Sue", the largest known Tyrannosaurus specimen, and that the bones of Giganotosaurus appeared to be more robust, indicating a heavier animal. They estimated the skull to have been about 1.53 m (5 ft) long, and the whole animal to have been 12.5 m (41 ft) long, with a weight of about 6 to 8 t (6.6 to 8.8 short tons).

In 1996, the paleontologist Paul Sereno and colleagues described a new skull of the related genus Carcharodontosaurus from Morocco, a theropod described in 1927 but previously known only from fragmentary remains. They estimated the skull to have been 1.60 m (5 ft) long, similar to Giganotosaurus, but perhaps exceeding that of the Tyrannosaurus "Sue", with a 1.53 m (5 ft) long skull. They also pointed out that carcharodontosaurs appear to have had the proportionally largest skulls, but that Tyrannosaurus appears to have had longer hind limbs. In an interview for a 1995 article entitled "new beast usurps T. rex as king carnivore", Sereno noted that these newly discovered theropods from South America and Africa competed with Tyrannosaurus as the largest predators, and would help in the understanding of Late Cretaceous dinosaur faunas, which had otherwise been very "North America-centric". In the same issue of the journal in which Carcharodontosaurus was described, the paleontologist Philip J. Currie cautioned that it was yet to be determined which of the two animals were larger, and that the size of an animal is less interesting to paleontologists than, for example, adaptations, relationships, and distribution. He also found it remarkable that the two animals were found within a year of each other, and were closely related, in spite of being found on different continents.

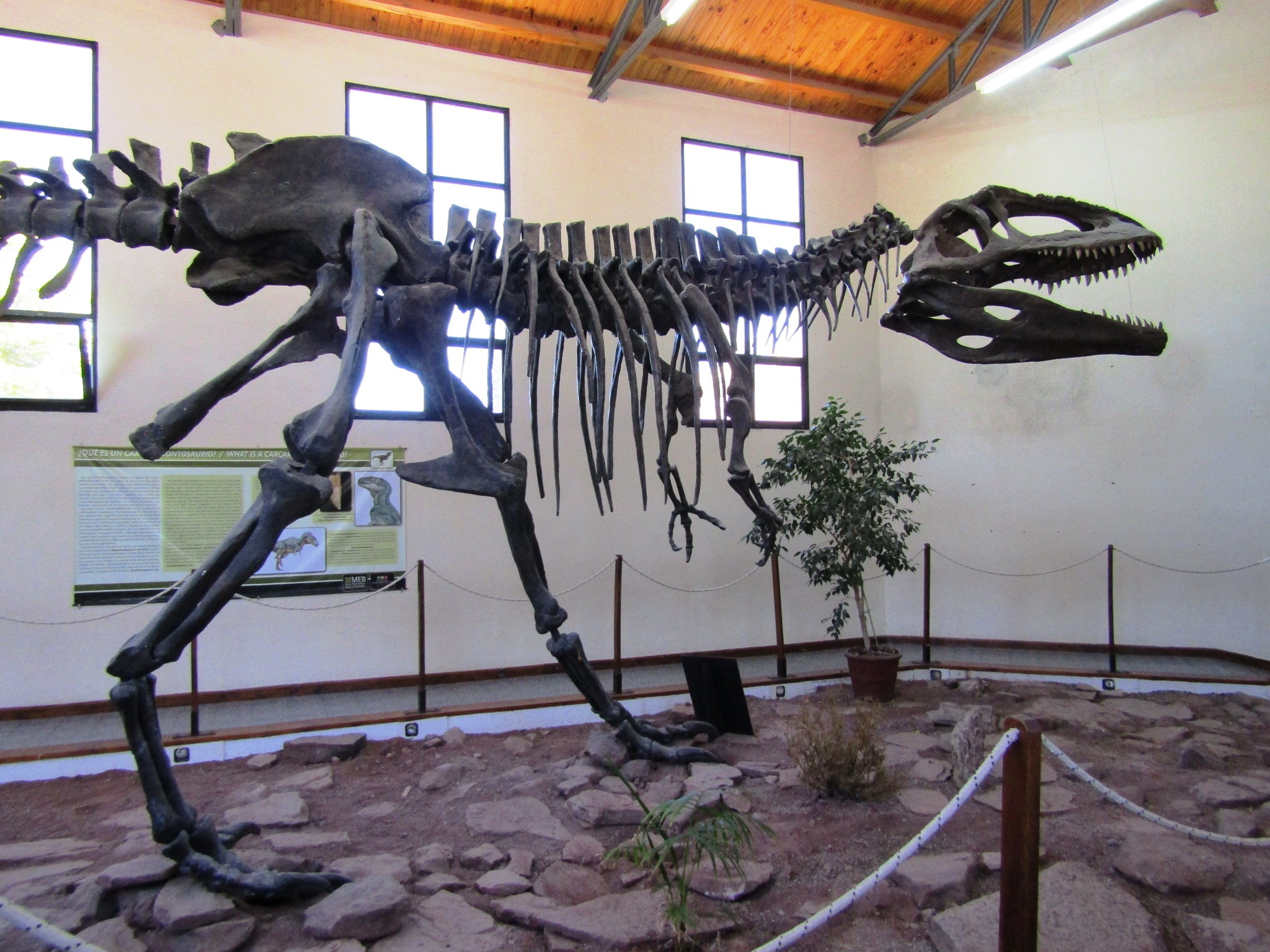
Reconstructed skeleton, EBPM

In a 1997 interview, Coria estimated Giganotosaurus to have been 13.7 (45 ft) to 14.3 (47 ft) m long and weighing 8 to 10 t (8.8 to 11.0 short tons) based on new material, larger than Carcharodontosaurus. Sereno countered that it would be difficult to determine a size range for a species based on few, incomplete specimens, and both paleontologists agreed that other aspects of these dinosaurs were more important than settling the "size contest". In 1998, the paleontologist Jorge O. Calvo and Coria assigned a partial left dentary bone (part of the lower jaw) containing some teeth (MUCPv-95) to Giganotosaurus. It had been collected by Calvo near Los Candeleros in 1988 (found in 1987), who described it briefly in 1989, while noting it may have belonged to a new theropod taxon. Calvo and Coria found the dentary to be identical to that of the holotype, though 8% larger at 62 cm (24 in). Though the rear part of it is incomplete, they proposed that the skull of the holotype specimen would have been 1.80 m (6 ft) long, and estimated the skull of the larger specimen to have been 1.95 m (6.4 ft) long, the longest skull of any theropod.

In 1999, Calvo assigned an incomplete tooth, (MUCPv-52), to Giganotosaurus; this specimen was discovered near Lake Ezequiel Ramos Mexia in 1987 by A. Delgado, and is therefore the first known fossil of the genus. Calvo further suggested that some theropod trackways and isolated tracks (which he made the basis of the ichnotaxon Abelichnus astigarrae in 1991) belonged to Giganotosaurus, based on their large size. The largest tracks are 50 cm (20 in) long with a pace of 130 cm (51 in), and the smallest is 36 cm (14 in) long with a pace of 100 cm (39 in). The tracks are tridactyl (three-toed) and have large and coarse digits, with prominent claw impressions. Impressions of the digits occupy most of the track-length, and one track has a thin heel. Though the tracks were found in a higher stratigraphic level than the main fossils of Giganotosaurus, they were from the same strata as the single tooth and some sauropod dinosaurs that are also known from the same strata as Giganotosaurus.

=== Continued size estimations ===
In 2001, the physician-scientist Frank Seebacher proposed a new polynomial method of calculating body-mass estimates for dinosaurs (using body-length, depth, and width), and found Giganotosaurus to have weighed 6.6 t (7.3 short tons) (based on the original 12.5 m (41 ft) length estimate). In their 2002 description of the braincase of Giganotosaurus, Coria and Currie gave a length estimate of 1.60 m (5 ft) for the holotype skull, and calculated a weight of 4.2 t (4.6 short tons) by extrapolating from the 520 mm (20 in) circumference of the femur-shaft. This resulted in an encephalization quotient (a measure of relative brain size) of 1.9. In 2004, the paleontologist Gerardo V. Mazzetta and colleagues pointed out that though the femur of the Giganotosaurus holotype was larger than that of "Sue", the tibia was 8 cm (3 in) shorter at 1.12 m (4 ft). They found the holotype specimen to have been equal to Tyrannosaurus in size at 8 t (8.8 short tons) (marginally smaller than "Sue"), but that the larger dentary might have represented an animal of 10 t (11 short tons), if geometrically similar to the holotype specimen. By using multivariate regression equations, these authors also suggested an alternative weight of 6.5 t (7.2 short tons) for the holotype and 8.2 t (9.0 short tons) for the larger specimen, and that the latter was therefore the largest known terrestrial carnivore.

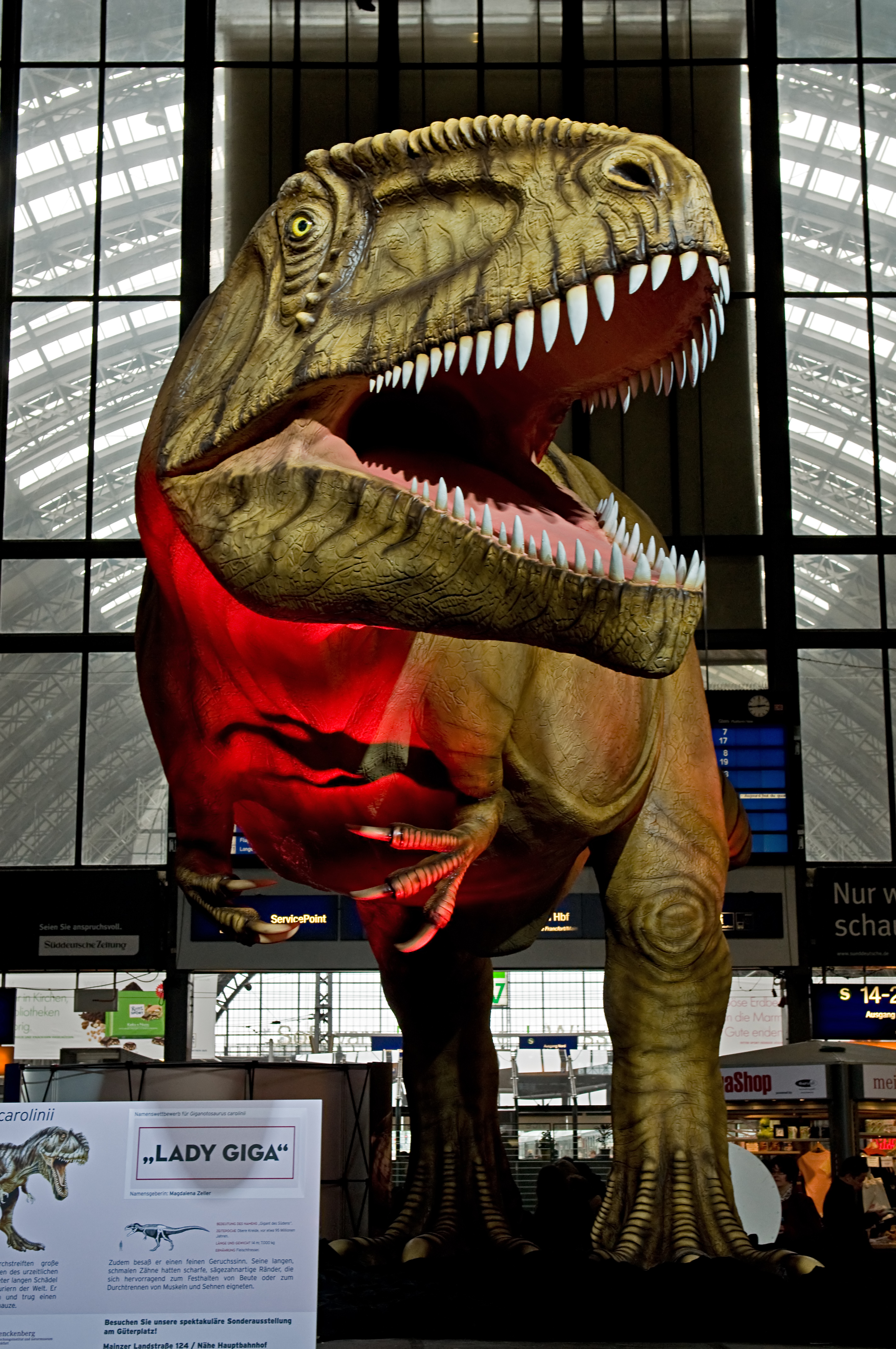
Full size model nicknamed "Lady Giga", Frankfurt Hauptbahnhof.

In 2005, the paleontologist Cristiano Dal Sasso and colleagues described new skull material (a snout) of Spinosaurus (the original fossils of which were also destroyed during World War II), and concluded this dinosaur would have been 16 to 18 m (52 to 59 ft) long with a weight 7 to 9 t (7.7 to 9.9 short tons), exceeding the maximum size of all other theropods. In 2006, Coria and Currie described the large theropod Mapusaurus from Patagonia; it was closely related to Giganotosaurus and of approximately the same size. In 2007, the paleontologists François Therrien and Donald M. Henderson found that Giganotosaurus would have approached 13 m (43 ft) in length and 13.8 t (15.2 short tons) in weight, while Carcharodontosaurus would have approached 13.3 m (44 ft) in length and 15.1 t (16.6 short tons) in weight (surpassing Tyrannosaurus), and estimated the Giganotosaurus holotype skull to have been 1.56 m (5 ft) long. They cautioned that these measurements depended on whether the incomplete skulls of these animals had been reconstructed correctly, and that more complete specimens were needed for more accurate estimates. They also found that Dal Sasso and colleagues' reconstruction of Spinosaurus was too large, and instead estimated it to have been 14.3 m (47 ft) long, weighing 20.9 t (23.0 short tons), and possibly as low as 12.6 m (41 ft) in length and 12 t (13 short tons) in weight. They concluded that these dinosaurs had reached the upper biomechanical size limit attainable by a strictly bipedal animal. In 2010, the paleontologist Gregory S. Paul suggested that the skulls of carcharodontosaurs had been reconstructed as too long in general.

In 2012, the paleontologist Matthew T. Carrano and colleagues noted that though Giganotosaurus had received much attention due to its enormous size, and in spite of the holotype being relatively complete, it had not yet been described in detail, apart from the braincase. They pointed out that many contacts between skull bones were not preserved, which lead to the total length of the skull being ambiguous. They found instead that the skulls of Giganotosaurus and Carcharodontosaurus were exactly the same size as that of Tyrannosaurus. They also measured the femur of the Giganotosaurus holotype to be 1.365 m (4 ft) long, in contrast to the original measurement, and proposed that the body mass would have been smaller overall. In 2013, the paleontologist Scott Hartman published a Graphic Double Integration mass estimate (based on drawn skeletal reconstructions) on his blog, wherein he found Tyrannosaurus ("Sue") to have been larger than Giganotosaurus overall. He estimated the Giganotosaurus holotype to have weighed 6.8 t (7.5 short tons), and the larger specimen 8.2 t (9.0 short tons). Tyrannosaurus was estimated to have weighed 8.4 t (9.3 short tons), and Hartman noted that it had a wider torso, though the two seemed similar in side view. He also pointed out that the Giganotosaurus dentary that was supposedly 8% larger than that of the holotype specimen would rather have been 6.5% larger, or could simply have belonged to a similarly sized animal with a more robust dentary. He conceded that with only one good Giganotosaurus specimen known, it is possible that larger individuals will be found, as it took most of a century to find "Sue" after Tyrannosaurus was discovered.

Size (green) compared to that of other large theropods

In 2014, the paleontologist Nizar Ibrahim and colleagues estimated the length of Spinosaurus to have been over 15 m (49 ft), by extrapolating from a new specimen scaled up to match the snout described by Dal Sasso and colleagues. This would make Spinosaurus the largest known carnivorous dinosaur. In 2019, the paleontologist W. Scott Persons and colleagues described a Tyrannosaurus specimen (nicknamed "Scotty"), and estimated it to be more massive than other giant theropods, but cautioned that the femoral proportions of the carcharodontosaurids Giganotosaurus and Tyrannotitan indicated a body mass larger than other adult Tyrannosaurus. They noted that these theropods were known by far fewer specimens than Tyrannosaurus, and that future finds may reveal specimens larger than "Scotty", as indicated by the large Giganotosaurus dentary. While "Scotty" had the greatest femoral circumference, the femoral length of Giganotosaurus was about 10% longer, but the authors stated it was difficult to compare proportions between large theropod clades.

In 2021, the paleontologist Matías Reolid and colleagues compiled various mass estimates of theropods (including Giganotosaurus) to calculate the average, but did not include Therrien and Henderson's 2007 estimates of Carnotaurus and Giganotosaurus, considering them outliers. This resulted in a body mass range for Giganotosaurus between 5.5 and 8.5 t (6.1 and 9.4 short tons), with an average of 6.75 t (7.44 short tons). They also applied the skull length and body length ratio proposed by Therrien and Henderson and reconstructed various digital 3D models of theropods to measure body mass distribution and volume, resulting in the mass of a 13 m (43 ft) long Giganotosaurus up to 7.2 t (7.9 short tons). These researchers found the estimates consistent with the values proposed by previous studies. In 2022, Juan I. Canale and colleagues described the large carcharodontosaurid Meraxes, which has the most completely known Carcharodontosaurine skull, with an estimated length of 1.27 m (4.2 ft). Extrapolating from that skull, they estimated the skull of Giganotosaurus to have been 1.634 m (5.36 ft) long, making it one of the largest known theropod skulls. Henderson suggested in 2023 that there was a close relation between the dimensions of the pelvic area and body size in theropods, allowing size estimates for incomplete specimens. Based on this idea, he found Giganotosaurus to have been 12.5 m (41 ft) long, identical to the estimate proposed in the 1995 description.

== Description ==
Comparison between the estimated sizes of the holotype (light green) and assigned specimen (dark green)

Giganotosaurus is thought to have been one of the largest theropod dinosaurs, but the incompleteness of its remains have made it difficult to estimate its size reliably. It is therefore impossible to determine with certainty whether it was larger than Tyrannosaurus, for example, which has been considered the largest theropod historically. Different size estimates have been reached by several researchers, based on various methods, and depending on how the missing parts of the skeleton have been reconstructed. Length estimates for the holotype specimen have varied between 12 and 13 m (39 and 43 ft), with a skull between 1.53 and 1.80 m (5.0 and 5.9 ft) long, a femur (thigh bone) between 1.365 and 1.43 m (4.48 and 4.69 ft) long, and a weight between 4.2 and 13.8 t (4.6 and 15.2 short tons). Fusion of sutures (joints) in the braincase indicates the holotype specimen was a mature individual. A second specimen, consisting of a dentary bone from a supposedly larger individual, has been used to extrapolate a length of 13.2 m (43 ft), a skull 1.95 m (6.4 ft) long, and a weight of 8.2 t (9.0 short tons). Some writers have considered the largest size estimates for both specimens exaggerated. Giganotosaurus has been compared to an oversized version of the well-known genus Allosaurus.

=== Skull ===
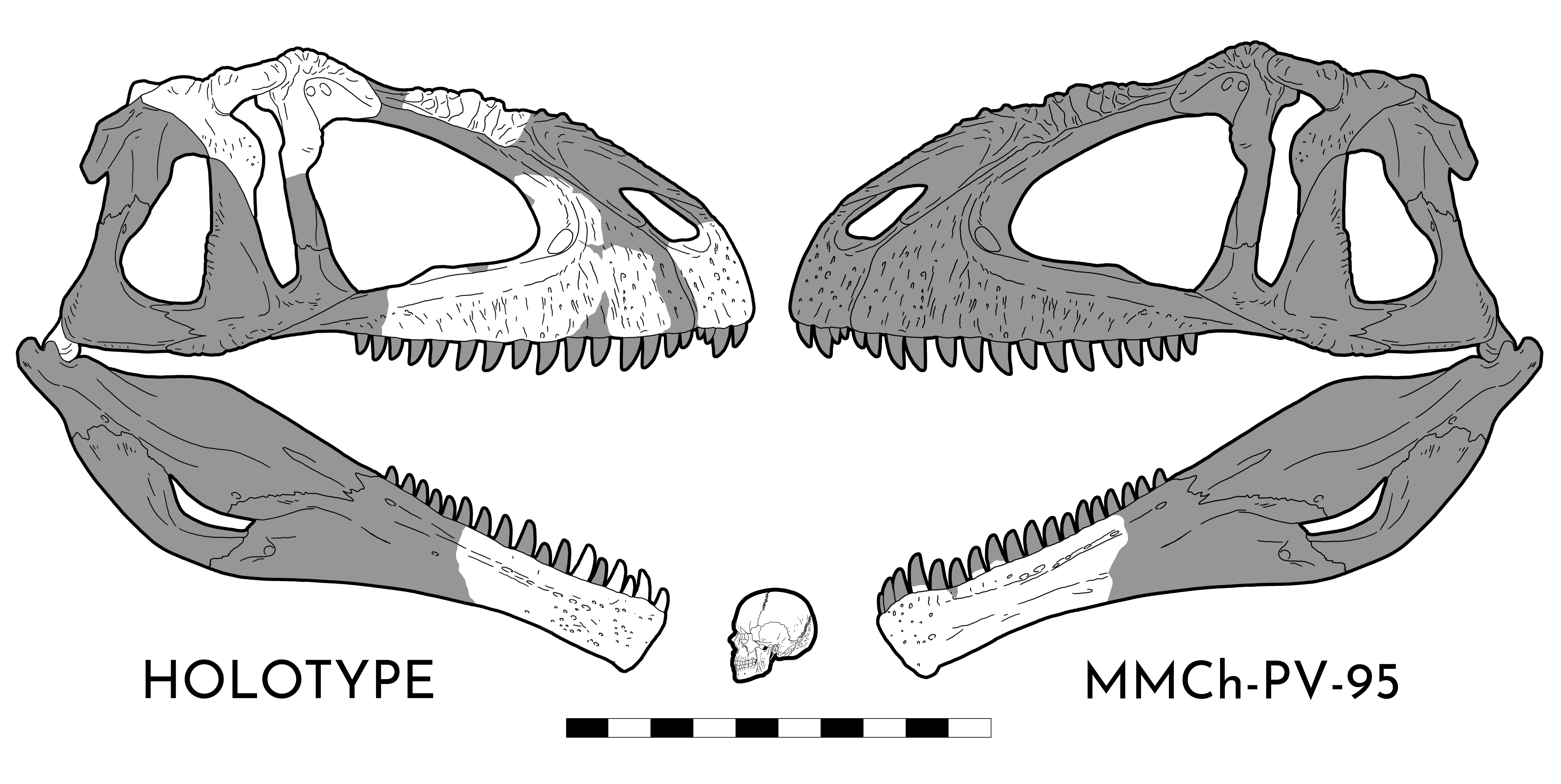
Diagram showing the known skull remains of the holotype (left) and the assigned specimen

Though incompletely known, the skull of Giganotosaurus appears to have been low. The premaxilla (frontmost bone of the upper jaw) had four alveoli (tooth sockets), as in Acrocanthosaurus and Sinraptor. The maxilla of the upper jaw had a 92 cm (36 in) long tooth row, was deep from top to bottom, and its upper and lower edges were almost parallel. The maxilla had a pronounced process (projection) under the nostril, and a small, ellipse-shaped fenestra (opening), as in Allosaurus and Tyrannosaurus. The nasal bone was very rugose (rough and wrinkled), and these rugosities continued backwards, covering the entire upper surface of this bone. The lacrimal bone in front of the eye had a prominent, rugose crest (or horn) that pointed up at a backwards angle. As in other carcharodontosaurs, it did not project far above the upper margin of the skull, unlike the raised horn of Allosaurus. The crest was ridge-like, and had deep grooves. The postorbital bone behind the eye had a down and backwards directed jugal process that projected into the orbit (eye opening), as seen in Tyrannosaurus, Abelisaurus, and Carnotaurus. The supraorbital bone above the eye that contacted between the lacrimal and postorbital bones was eave-like, and similar to that of Abelisaurus. The quadrate bone at the back of the skull was 44 cm (17 in) long, and had two pneumatic (air-filled) foramina (holes) on the inner side.

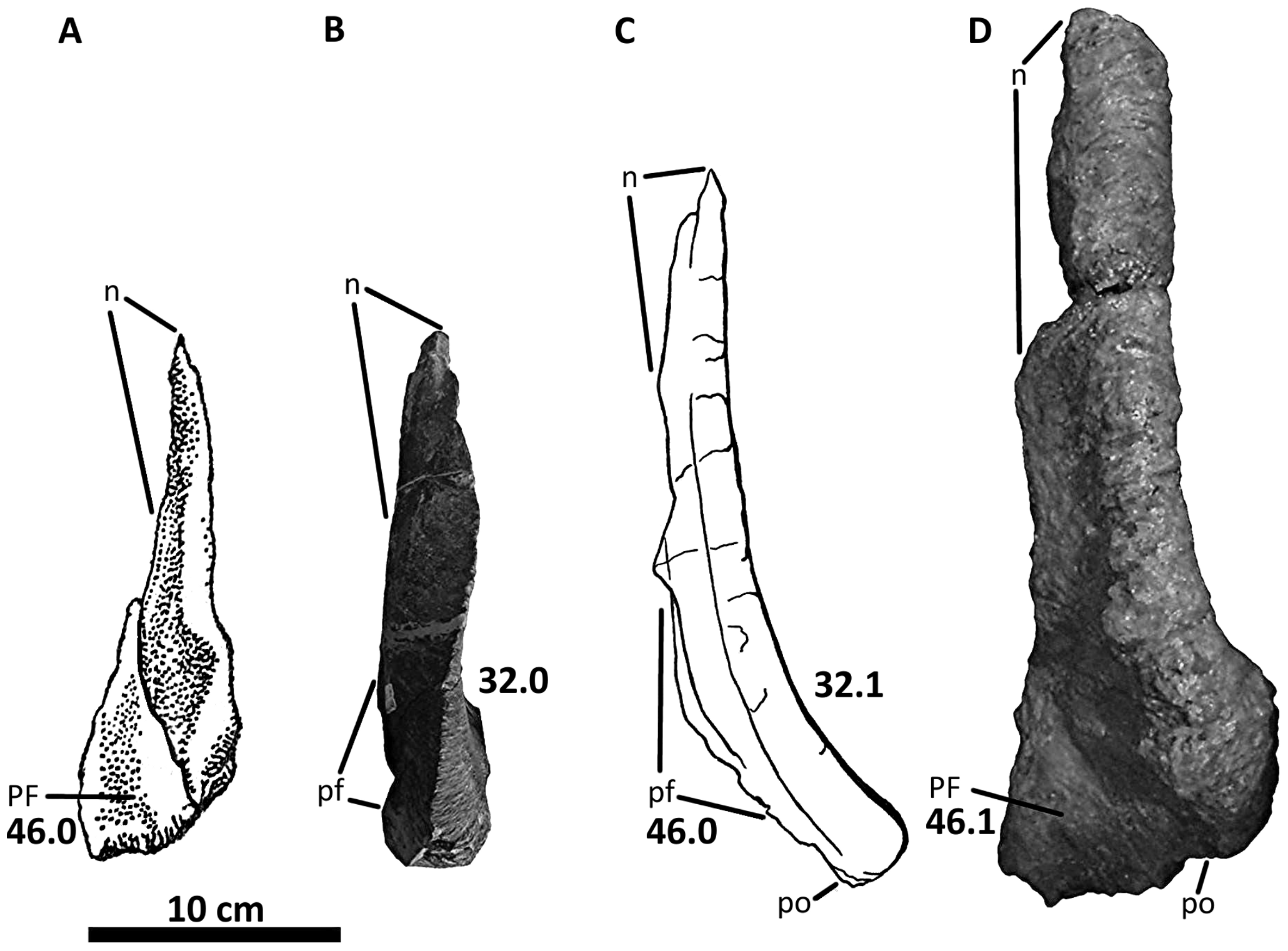
Lacrimal bones of allosauroids; D is Giganotosaurus

The skull roof (formed by the frontal and parietal bones) was broad and formed a "shelf", which overhung the short supratemporal fenestrae at the top rear of the skull. The jaw articulated far behind the occipital condyle (where the neck is attached to the skull) compared to other theropods. The condyle was broad and low, and had pneumatic cavities. Giganotosaurus did not have a sagittal crest on the top of the skull, and the jaw muscles did not extend onto the skull roof, unlike in most other theropods (due to the shelf over the supratemporal fenestrae). These muscles would instead have been attached to the lower side surfaces of the shelf. The neck muscles that elevated the head would have attached to the prominent supraoccipital bones on the top of the skull, which functioned like the nuchal crest of tyrannosaurs. A latex endocast of the brain cavity of Giganotosaurus showed that the brain was similar to that of the related genus Carcharodontosaurus, but larger. The endocast was 29 mm (1 in) long, 64 mm (3 in) wide, and had a volume of 275 ml (9.7 imp fl oz).

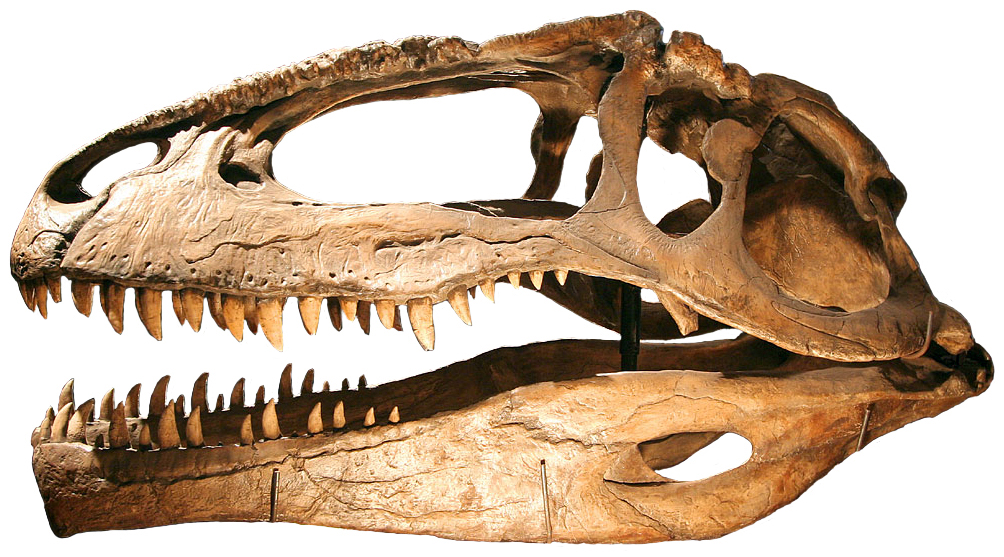
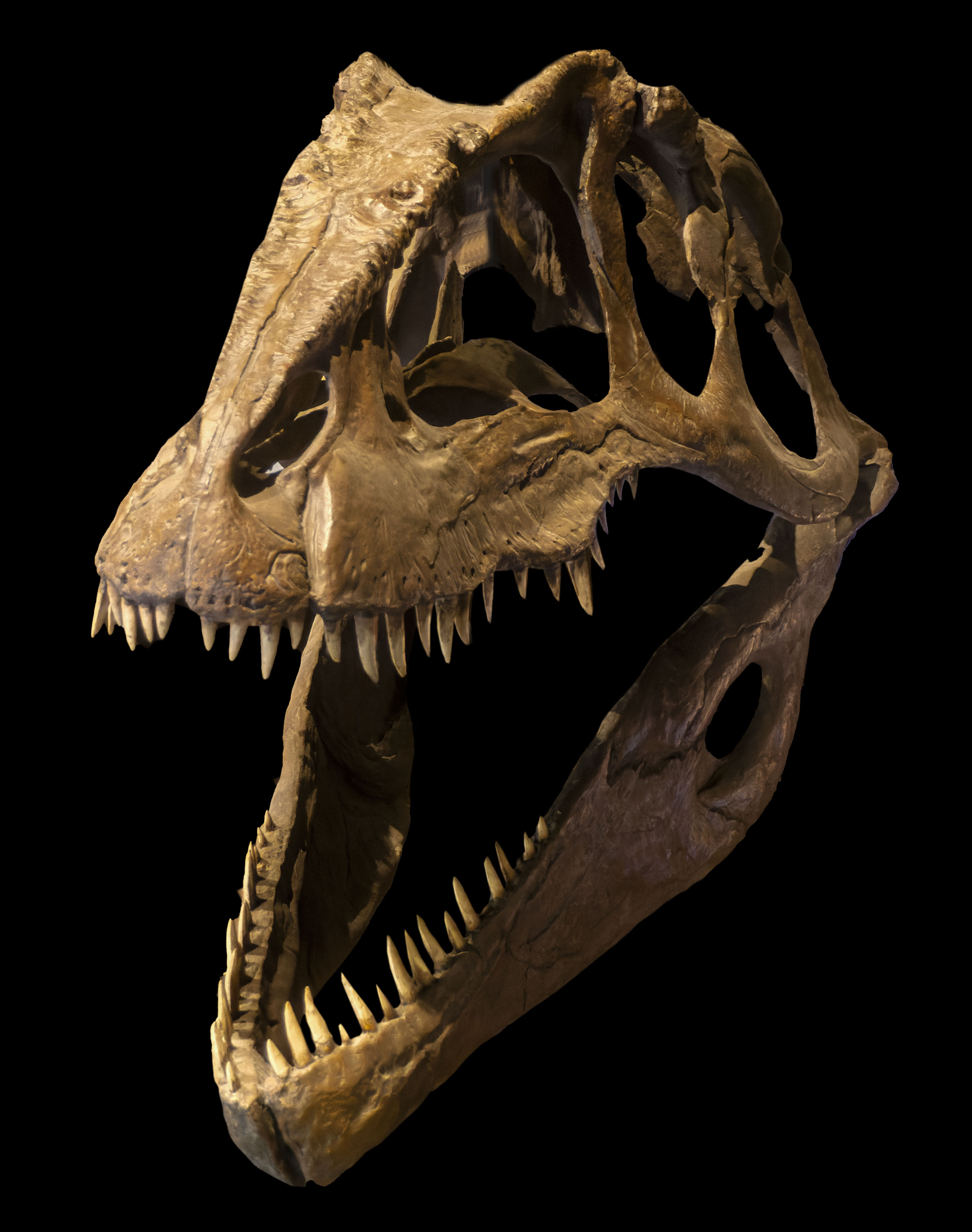
Skull reconstructed in Japan from the side and in semi-profile; it is possibly reconstructed as too long

The dentary of the lower jaw expanded in height towards the front (by the mandibular symphysis, where the two halves of the lower jaw connected), where it was also flattened, and it had a downwards projection at the tip (which has been referred to as a "chin"). The lower side of the dentary was concave, the outer side was convex in upper view, and a groove ran along it, which supported foramina that nourished the teeth. The inner side of the dentary had a row of interdental plates, where each tooth had a foramen. The Meckelian groove ran along the lower border. The curvature of the dentary shows that the mouth of Giganotosaurus would have been wide. It is possible that each dentary had twelve alveoli. Most of the alveoli were about 3.5 cm (1.3 in) long from front to back. The teeth of the dentary were of similar shape and size, except for the first one, which was smaller. The teeth were compressed sideways, were oval in cross-section, and had serrations at the front and back borders, which is typical of theropods. The teeth were sigmoid-shaped when seen in front and back view. One tooth had nine to twelve serrations per mm (0.039 in). The side teeth of Giganotosaurus had curved ridges of enamel, and the largest teeth in the premaxilla had pronounced wrinkles (with their highest relief near the serrations).

=== Postcranial skeleton ===
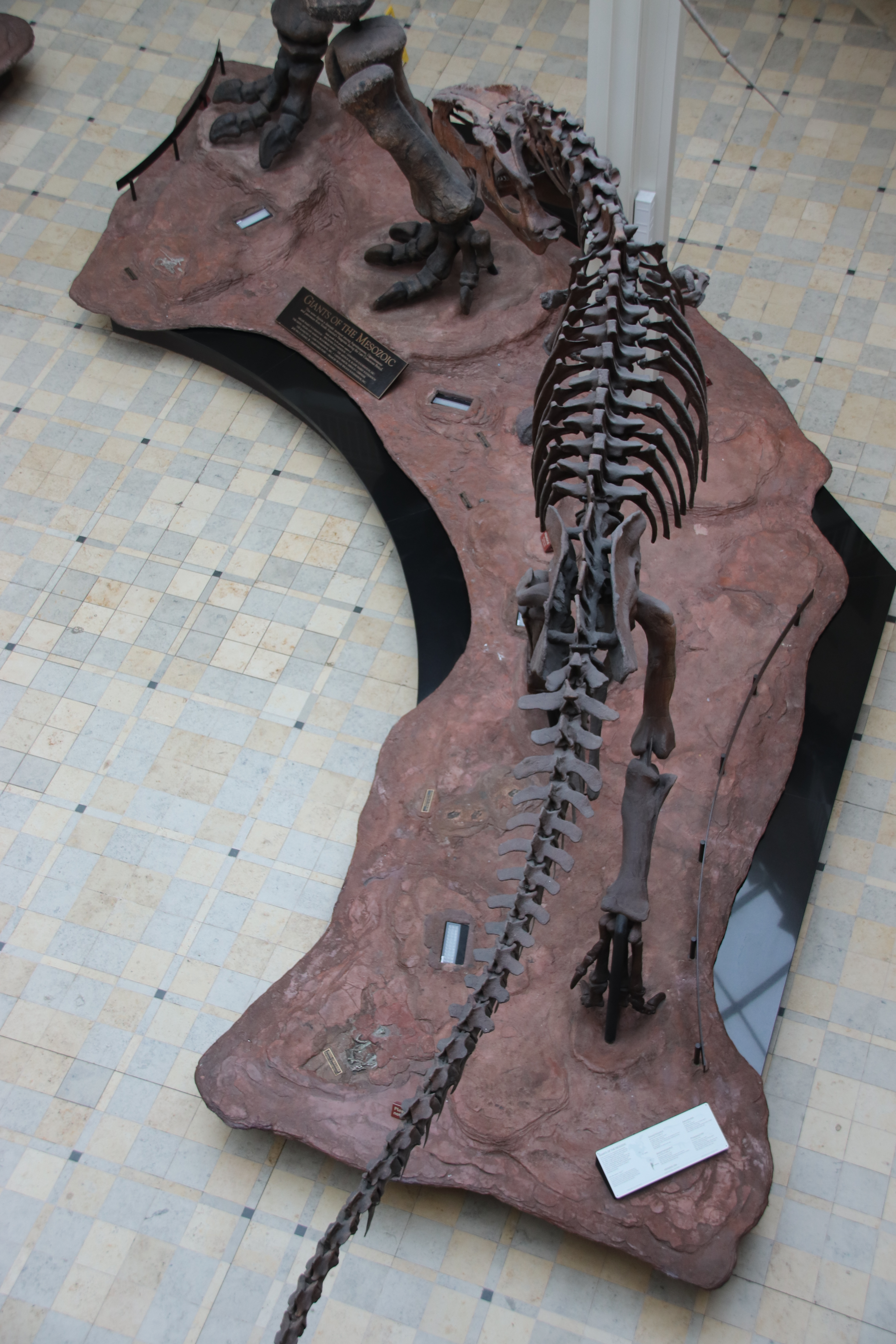
Fernbank Museum skeleton shown from above

The neck of Giganotosaurus was strong, and the axis bone (the neck vertebra that articulates with the skull) was robust. The rear neck (cervical) vertebrae had short, flattened centra (the "bodies" of the vertebrae), with almost hemispherical articulations (contacts) at the front, and pleurocoels (hollow depressions) divided by laminae (plates). The back (dorsal) vertebrae had high neural arches and deep pleurocoels. The tail (caudal) vertebrae had neural spines that were elongated from front to back and had robust centra. The transverse processes of the caudal vertebrae were long from front to back, and the chevrons on the front were blade-like. The pectoral girdle was proportionally shorter than that of Tyrannosaurus, with the ratio between the scapula (shoulder blade) and the femur being less than 0.5. The blade of the scapula had parallel borders, and a strong tubercle for insertion of the triceps muscle. The coracoid was small and hook-shaped.

The ilium of the pelvis had a convex upper border, a low postacetabular blade (behind the acetabulum), and a narrow brevis-shelf (a projection where tail muscles attached). The pubic foot was pronounced and shorter at the front than behind. The ischium was straight and expanded hindwards, ending in a lobe-shape. The femur was sigmoid-shaped, and had a very robust, upwards pointing head, with a deep sulcus (groove). The lesser trochanter of the femoral head was wing-like, and placed below the greater trochanter, which was short. The fourth trochanter was large and projected backwards. The tibia of the lower leg was expanded at the upper end, its articular facet (where it articulated with the femur) was wide, and its shaft was compressed from front to back.

== Classification ==
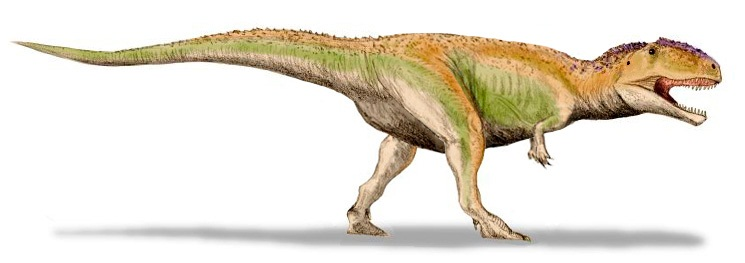
Life restoration

Coria and Salgado originally found Giganotosaurus to group more closely with the theropod clade Tetanurae than to more basal (or "primitive") theropods such as ceratosaurs, due to shared features (synapomorphies) in the legs, skull, and pelvis. Other features showed that it was outside the more derived (or "advanced") clade Coelurosauria. In 1996, Sereno and colleagues found Giganotosaurus, Carcharodontosaurus, and Acrocanthosaurus to be closely related within the superfamily Allosauroidea, and grouped them in the family Carcharodontosauridae. Features shared between these genera include the lacrimal and postorbital bones forming a broad "shelf" over the orbit, and the squared front end of the lower jaw.

As more carcharodontosaurids were discovered, their interrelationships became clearer. The group was defined as all allosauroids closer to Carcharodontosaurus than Allosaurus or Sinraptor by the paleontologist Thomas R. Holtz and colleagues in 2004. In 2006, Coria and Currie united Giganotosaurus and Mapusaurus in the carcharodontosaurid subfamily Giganotosaurinae based on shared features of the femur, such as a weak fourth trochanter, and a shallow, broad groove on the lower end. In 2008, Sereno and the paleontologist Stephen L. Brusatte united Giganotosaurus, Mapusaurus, and Tyrannotitan in the tribe Giganotosaurini. In 2010, Paul listed Giganotosaurus as "Giganotosaurus (or Carcharodontosaurus) carolinii" without elaboration. Giganotosaurus is one of the most complete and informative members of Carcharodontosauridae.

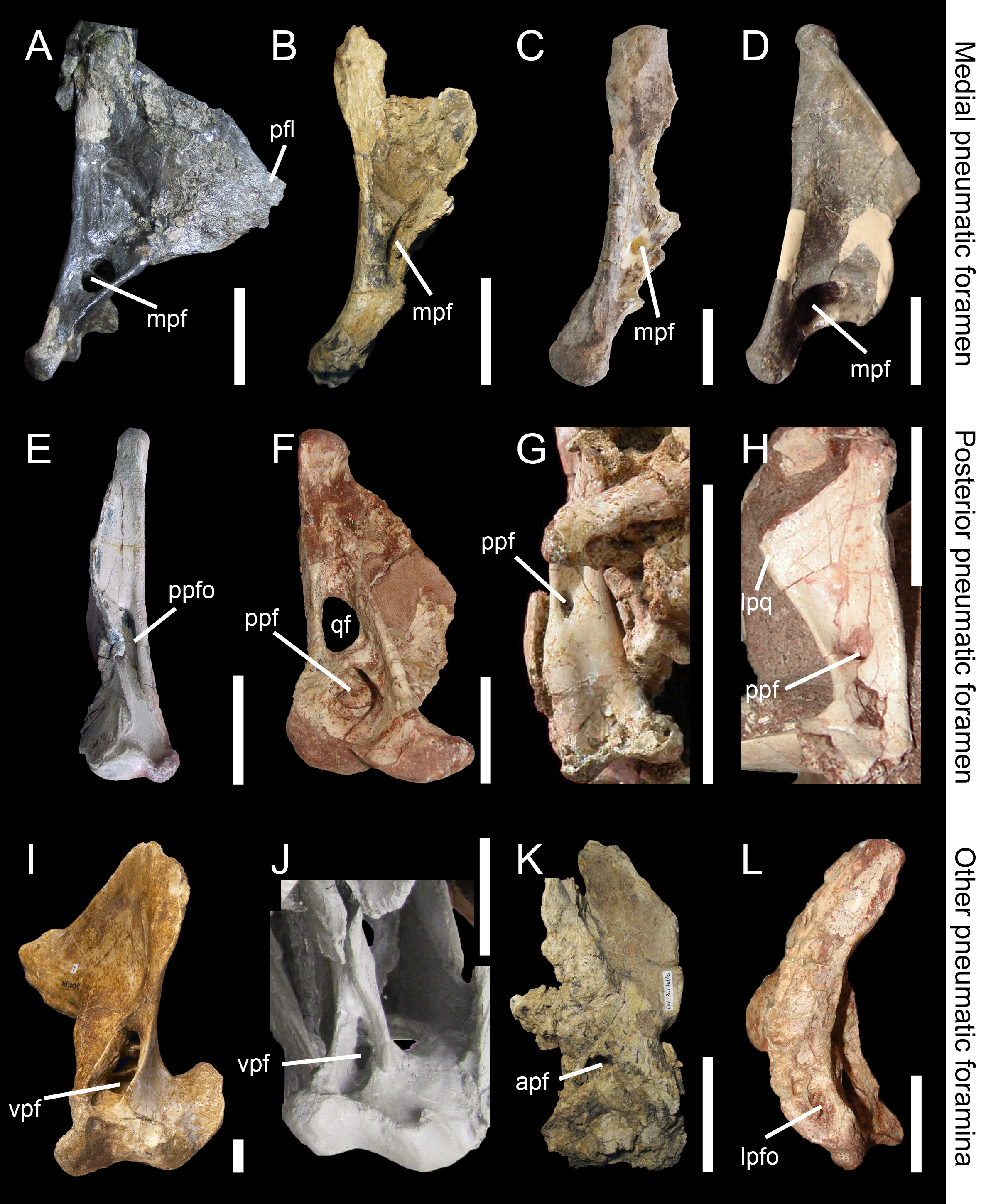
Quadrate bone openings in various theropds; C (top) is Giganotosaurus

The following cladogram shows the placement of Giganotosaurus within Carcharodontosauridae according the paleontologist Andrea Cau, 2024:

- Carcharodontosauridae
  - Neovenator
  - - - Sauroniops
      - Veterupristisaurus
      - Lusovenator
      - Eocarcharia (holotype skull roof)
      - Concavenator
    - - Carcharodontosaurus iguidensis (holotype maxilla)
      - - Acrocanthosaurus
        - - Eocarcharia (assigned maxilla)
          - - - - Meraxes
                - Carcharodontosaurus iguidensis (assigned cranial material)
              - - Lajasvenator
                - - Labocania
                  - Shaochilong
            - - - Carcharodontosaurus saharicus (neotype)
                - Carcharodontosaurus saharicus (SNSB-BSPG 1922 X 46, destroyed specimen, now Tameryraptor)
              - - Tyrannotitan
                - - Mapusaurus
                  - Giganotosaurus

=== Evolution ===
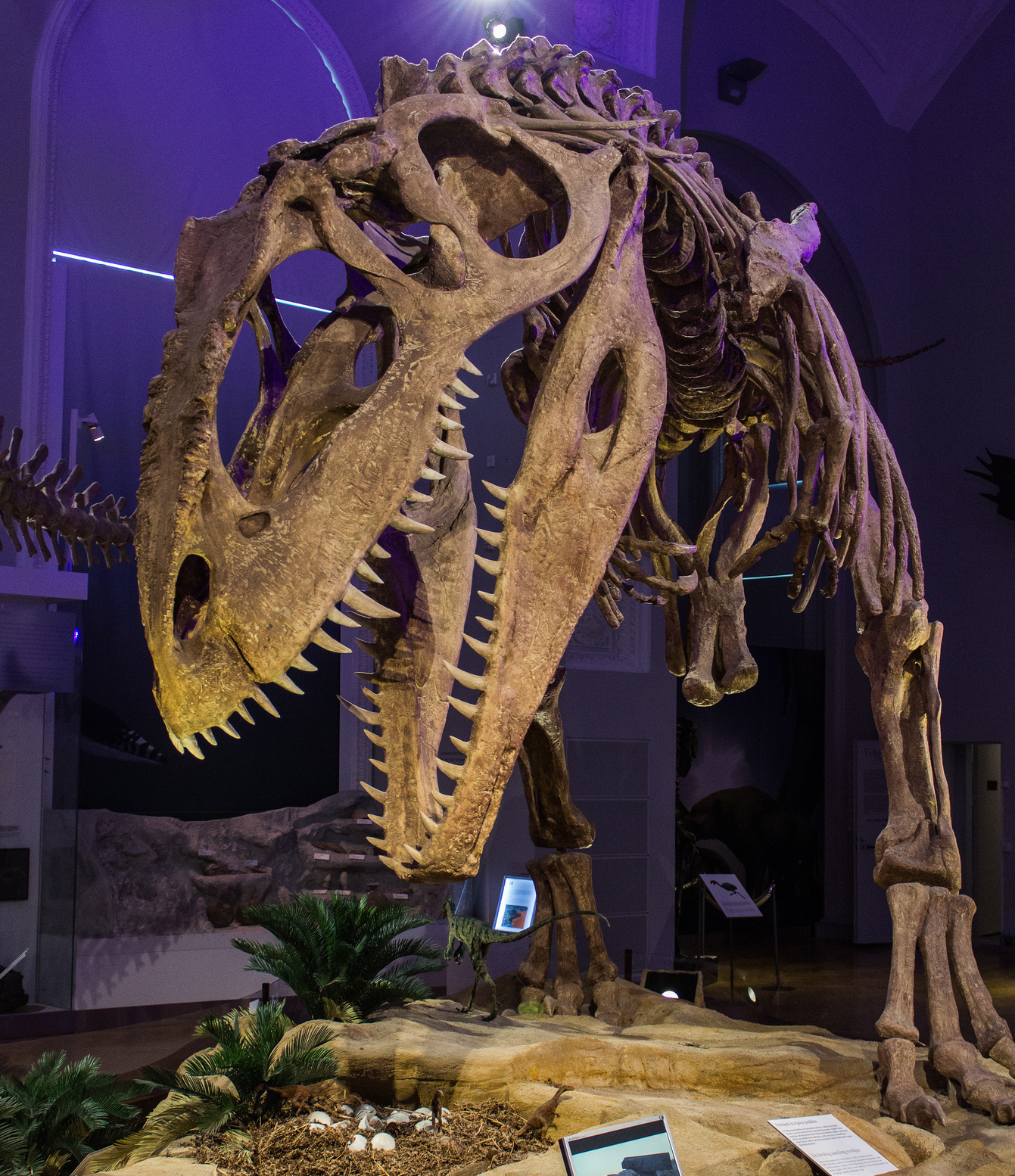
Reconstructed skeleton, Natural History Museum, Helsinki

Coria and Salgado suggested that the convergent evolution of gigantism in theropods could have been linked to common conditions in their environments or ecosystems. Sereno and colleagues found that the presence of carcharodontosaurids in Africa (Carcharodontosaurus), North America (Acrocanthosaurus), and South America (Giganotosaurus), showed the group had a transcontinental distribution by the Early Cretaceous period. Dispersal routes between the northern and southern continents appear to have been severed by ocean barriers in the Late Cretaceous, which led to more distinct, provincial faunas, by preventing exchange. Previously, it was thought that the Cretaceous world was biogeographically separated, with the northern continents being dominated by tyrannosaurids, South America by abelisaurids, and Africa by carcharodontosaurids. The subfamily Carcharodontosaurinae, in which Giganotosaurus belongs, appears to have been restricted to the southern continent of Gondwana (formed by South America and Africa), where they were probably the apex (top) predators. The South American tribe Giganotosaurini may have been separated from their African relatives through vicariance, when Gondwana broke up during the Aptian–Albian ages of the Early Cretaceous.

== Paleobiology ==
In 1999 and 2002, the paleontologist Reese E. Barrick and the geologist William J. Showers found that the bones of Giganotosaurus and Tyrannosaurus had very similar oxygen isotope patterns, with similar heat distribution in the body. These thermoregulatory patterns indicate that these dinosaurs had a metabolism intermediate between that of mammals and reptiles, and were therefore homeothermic (with a stable core body-temperature, a type of "warm-bloodedness"). The metabolism of an 8 t (8.8 short tons) Giganotosaurus would be comparable to that of a 1 t (1.1 short tons) mammalian carnivore, and would have supported rapid growth.

=== Locomotion ===
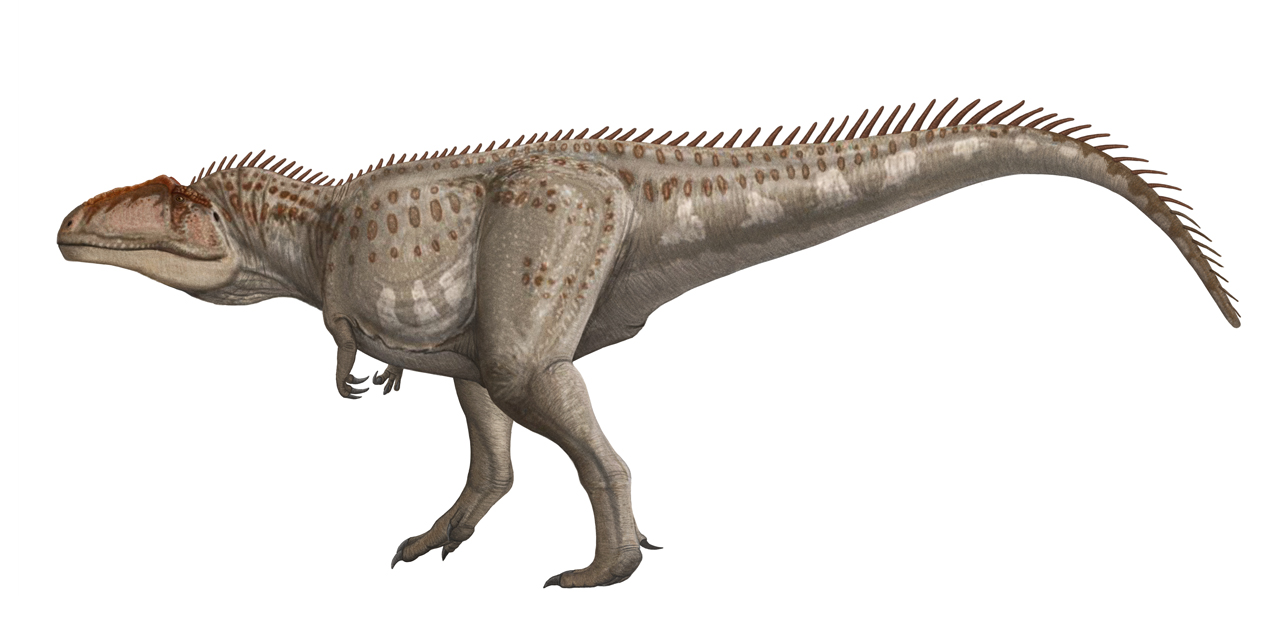
Restoration of a walking individual

In 2001, the physicist Rudemar Ernesto Blanco and Mazzetta evaluated the cursorial (running) capability of Giganotosaurus. They rejected the hypothesis by James O. Farlow that the risk of injuries involved in such large animals falling while on a run, would limit the speed of large theropods. Instead they posed that the imbalance caused by increasing velocity would be the limiting factor. Calculating the time it would take for a leg to gain balance after the retraction of the opposite leg, they found the upper kinematic limit of the running speed to be 14 m/s (50 km/h; 31 mph). They also found comparison between the running capability of Giganotosaurus and birds like the ostrich based on the strength of their leg-bones to be of limited value, since theropods, unlike birds, had heavy tails to counterbalance their weight.

A 2017 biomechanical study of the running ability of Tyrannosaurus by the biologist William I. Sellers and colleagues suggested that skeletal loads were too great to have allowed adult individuals to run. The relatively long limbs, which were long argued to indicate good running ability, would instead have mechanically limited it to walking gaits, and it would therefore not have been a high-speed pursuit predator. They suggested that these findings would also apply to other long-limbed giant theropods such as Giganotosaurus, Mapusaurus, and Acrocanthosaurus.

=== Feeding ===
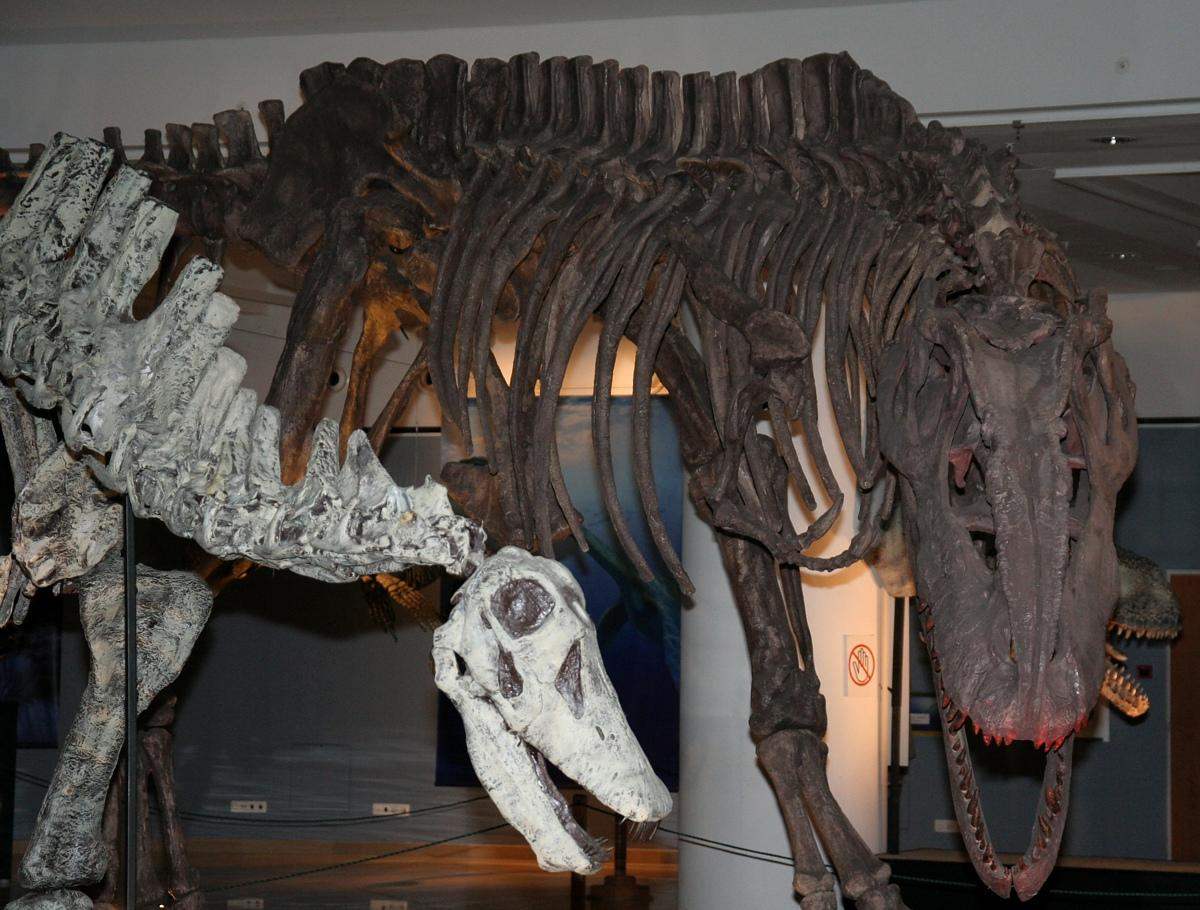
Casts of Giganotosaurus and the contemporary sauropod Limaysaurus, Hungarian Natural History Museum

In 2002, Coria and Currie found that various features of the rear part of the skull (such as the frontwards slope of the occiput and low and wide occipital condyle) indicate that Giganotosaurus would have had a good capability of moving the skull sideways in relation to the front neck vertebrae. These features may also have been related to the increased mass and length of the jaw muscles; the jaw articulation of Giganotosaurus and other carcharodontosaurids was moved hindwards to increase the length of the jaw musculature, enabling faster closure of the jaws, whereas tyrannosaurs increased the mass of the lower jaw musculature, to increase the power of their bite.

In 2005 Therrien and colleagues estimated the relative bite force of theropods and found that Giganotosaurus and related taxa had adaptations for capturing and bringing down prey by delivering powerful bites, whereas tyrannosaurs had adaptations for resisting torsional stress and crushing bones. Estimates in absolute values like newtons were impossible. The bite force of Giganotosaurus was weaker than that of Tyrannosaurus, and the force decreased hindwards along the tooth row. The lower jaws were adapted for slicing bites, and it probably captured and manipulated prey with the front part of the jaws. These authors suggested that Giganotosaurus and other allosaurs may have been generalized predators that fed on a wide spectrum of prey smaller than themselves, such as juvenile sauropods. The ventral process (or "chin") of the lower jaw may have been an adaptation for resisting tensile stress when the powerful bite was delivered with the front of the jaws against the prey.

The first known fossils of the closely related Mapusaurus were found in a bonebed consisting of several individuals at different growth stages. In their 2006 description of the genus, Coria and Currie suggested that though this could be due to a long term or coincidental accumulation of carcasses, the presence of different growth stages of the same taxon indicated the aggregation was not coincidental. In a 2006 National Geographic article, Coria stated that the bonebed was probably the result of a catastrophic event and that the presence of mainly medium-sized individuals, with very few young or old, is normal for animals that form packs. Therefore, Coria said, large theropods may have hunted in groups, which would be advantageous when hunting gigantic sauropods.

== Paleoenvironment ==
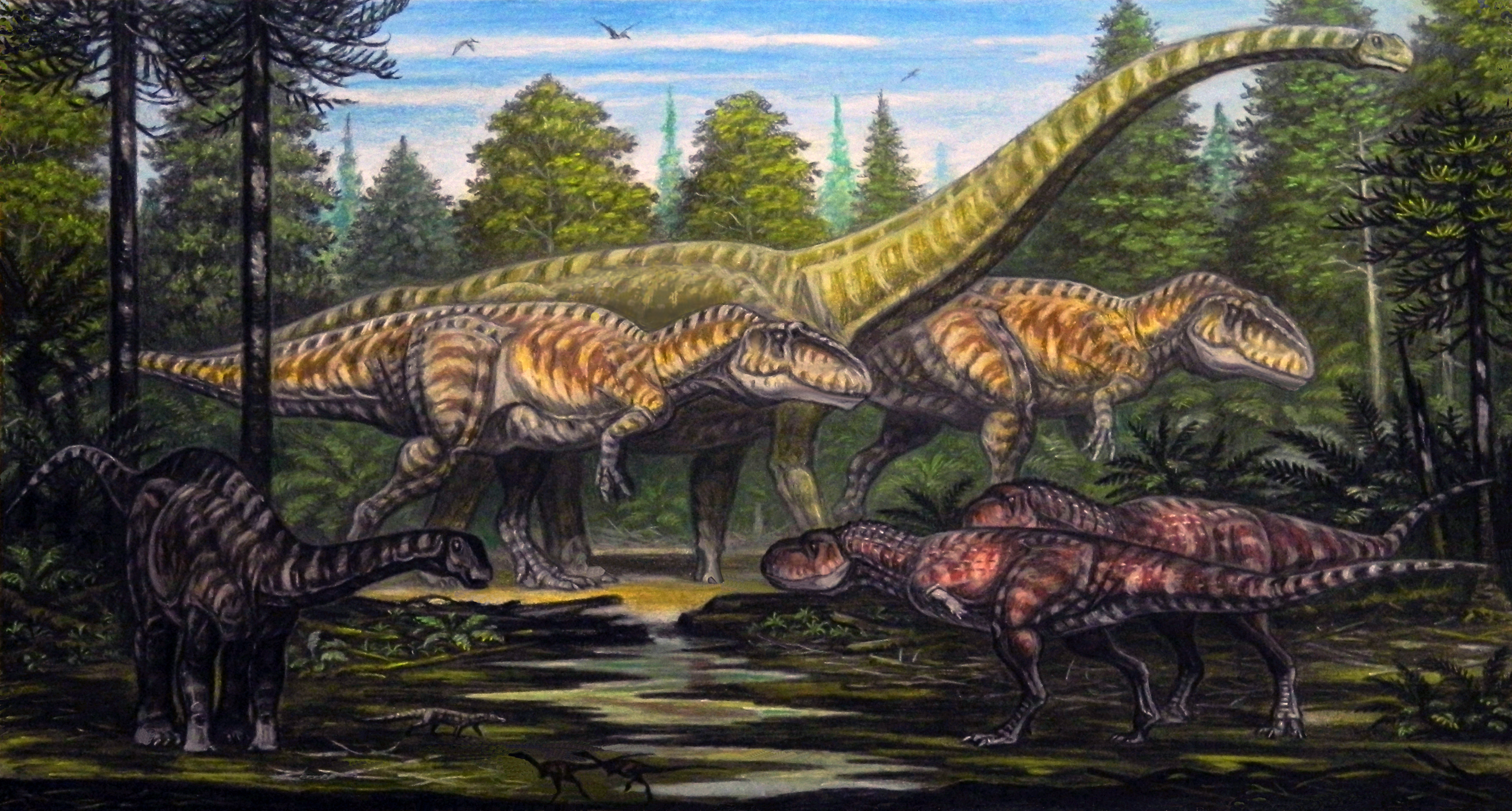
Restoration of two Giganotosaurus with contemporary dinosaurs

Giganotosaurus was discovered from the Candeleros Formation. Originally suggested to be the Cenomanian age of the Late Cretaceous, the maximum depositional age of both the Candeleros Formation and the overlying Huincul Formation is re-dated to the early Albian by Maniel and colleagues in 2026, approximately 111.4 ± 1.1 Ma and 106.2 ± 1.0 Ma, respectively. This formation is the lowest unit in the Neuquén Group, wherein it is part of the Río Limay Subgroup. The formation is composed of coarse and medium-grained sandstones deposited in a fluvial environment (associated with rivers and streams), and in aeolian conditions (effected by wind). Paleosols (buried soil), siltstones, and claystones are present, some of which represent swamp conditions.

Giganotosaurus was probably the apex predator in its ecosystem. It shared its environment with herbivorous dinosaurs such as the titanosaurian sauropod Andesaurus, and the rebbachisaurid sauropods Limaysaurus and Nopcsaspondylus. Other theropods include the abelisaurid Ekrixinatosaurus, the dromaeosaurid Buitreraptor, and the alvarezsauroid Alnashetri. Other reptiles include the crocodyliform Araripesuchus, sphenodontians, snakes, and the turtle Prochelidella. Other vertebrates include cladotherian mammals, a pipoid frog, and ceratodontiform fishes. Footprints indicate the presence of large ornithopods and pterosaurs as well.
