= Finnish Museum of Natural History =

Museum in Helsinki, Finland

Coordinates: 60°10′17″N 24°55′53″E

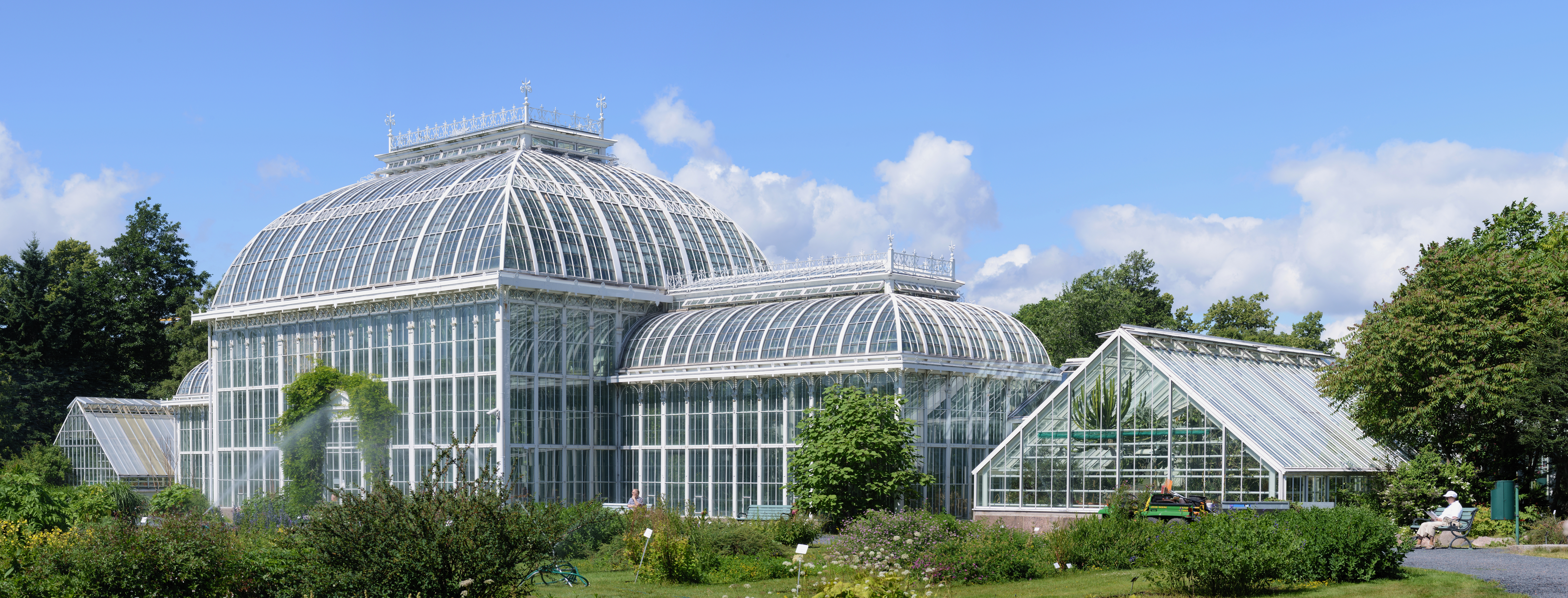
The Palm House (built 1889), Kaisaniemi Botanic Garden, Helsinki

The Finnish Museum of Natural History (Finnish: Luonnontieteellinen keskusmuseo, Swedish: Naturhistoriska centralmuseet), established in 1988, is a research institution under the University of Helsinki in Finland, based in Helsinki, Finland. It is a natural history museum responsible for the national botanical, zoological, geological and paleontological collections, which consist of samples from around the world. The collections serve scientific, public informational and educational purposes.

In regard to locations and buildings, the museum is divided into three: The Natural History Museum, the Kaisaniemi Botanic Garden, and the Kumpula Botanic Garden. From 1869 to 2014 it also included an independent geological department, but that has now been moved to the Kumpula Botanic Garden.

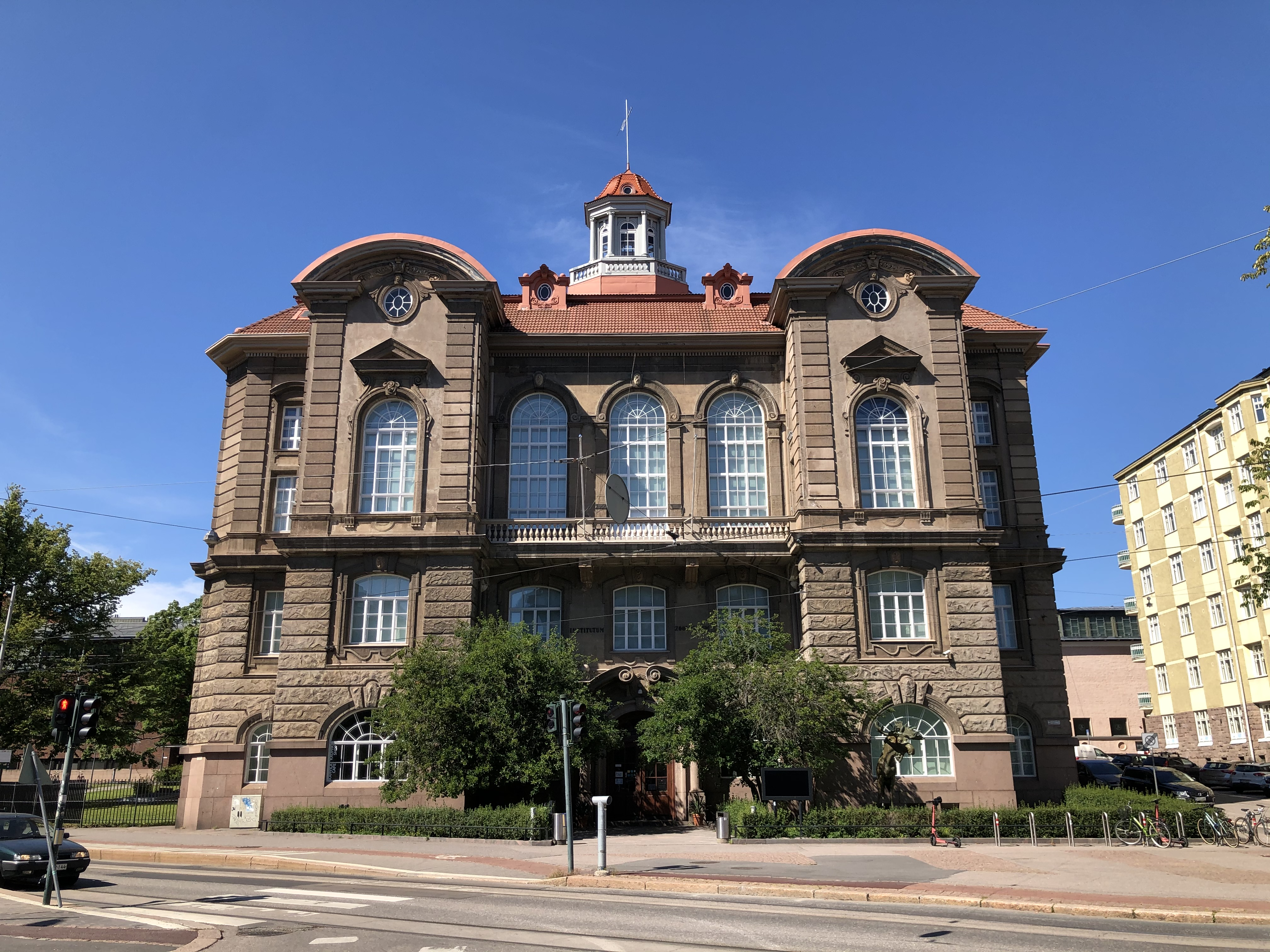
Natural History Museum, Helsinki (built 1913)

== Research units ==
Botany Unit

- Botanical Museum maintains the national herbarium of Finland containing 3,3 million specimens of plants, mosses and fungi.
- Botanic Gardens maintain a collection of living plants for education and research; is responsible for international seed exchange and public education on plants. In addition, there is a Sensory garden.

Zoology Unit

- Zoological Museum maintains a collection of 8 million animal specimens; performs research mainly on systematics, taxonomy, and zoogeography.
- Bird ringing centre and monitoring of bird populations

Natural Sciences Unit

- Laboratory of Chronology performs age determination of samples with physical methods (radiocarbon and optically stimulated luminescence dating).
- Geological Museum maintains collections of rock and ore samples (35,000 items), meteorites (500), and fossils (6,000). Axel Gadolin’s mineral collection is held at the museum.

== Notable people ==
- Teuvo Ahti
- Mikael Fortelius
- Lauri Kaila
- Harald Lindberg
- Martin Meinander
- Johan Axel Palmén
- Pontus Palmgren
- Alexander Sennikov
- Hans Silfverberg
- Ilmari Välikangas
