= Jukka Jernvall =

Finnish biologist (born 1963)

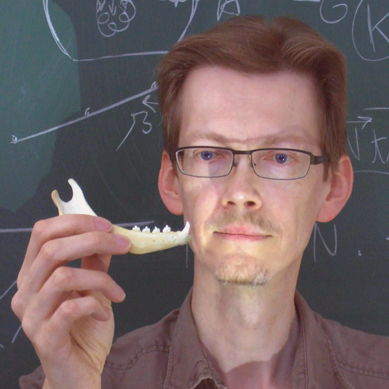
Jukka Jernvall

Jukka Jernvall (born 1963) is a Finnish evolutionary biologist in the field of evo-devo research. His research has centered on the interplay of ecology, evolution and developmental biology, especially of the mammalian dentition. Jernvall is currently an Academy Professor at the Institute of Biotechnology, University of Helsinki.

Jernvall received his Ph.D. in evolutionary biology in 1995. His thesis investigating the evolution and development of mammalian molar cusp patterns was supervised by Irma Thesleff and Mikael Fortelius. This led to the description of enamel knot as molecular signaling centers in teeth. He also discovered and coined the term ‘secondary enamel knot’, previously overlooked signaling centers regulating tooth cusp development. This discovery helped to mechanistically link molecular regulation of growth and differentiation to shape. Later, Jernvall has focused on the modelling of three-dimensional dentition phenotypes. He has studied why certain dentition patterns arise several times during the course of evolution, while other patterns occur only rarely. Jernvall's team has developed several methods from computer modeling of organ development to three-dimensional analysis of biological shape development and function. Current research ranges from mutant mice in the laboratory to evolutionary diversity in the fossil record and to seal genomics.
