= Irma Thesleff =

Finnish biologists

Irma Paula Nathalia Thesleff
- Born: Irma Paula Nathalia née Saxén; Helsinki, Finland
- Scientific career
- Fields: Developmental biology
- Institutions: University of Helsinki
- Thesis: Etiological variables in oral clefts (1975)
- Doctoral students: Jukka Jernvall

Irma Thesleff is a developmental biologist and Professor Emerita at the University of Helsinki known for her research on the development of mammalian organs, especially tooth development.

== Education and career ==
Thesleff received a degree in dentistry from University of Helsinki in 1972. For research her uncle, the developmental biologist Lauri Saxén, suggested she work on developmental biology of the mouth or the teeth because of her familiarity with the topic from her dentistry degree. She subsequently earned her Doctor of Odontology from the University of Helsinki in 1975 with research on cleft lip and palate. From 1976 until 1978, Thesleff was a visiting associate at the National Institute of Dental Research in Bethesda, Maryland. She returned to Finland, and served as an instructor at the University of Finland from 1979 until 1983, at which point she became a scientist at the Academy of Finland until 1990. In 1990 she was named professor in the department of pedodontics and orthodontics at the University of Helsinki.

She has served as the president of the European Orthodontic Society in 2009, and as the president of the Finnish Society for Developmental Biology.

== Research ==
Thesleff's work is in mammalian organs, and she is best known for studies on tissue interactions regulating tooth formation. This research includes work on the development of teeth from dental stem cells and includes investigations into congenital dental defects.

=== Selected publications ===
- Vainio, Seppo; Karavanova, Irina; Jowett, Adrian; Thesleff, Irma (1993). "Identification of BMP-4 as a signal mediating secondary induction between epithelial and mesenchymal tissues during early tooth development". Cell. 75 (1): 45–58. doi:10.1016/S0092-8674(05)80083-2. PMID 8104708. S2CID 46803201.
- Thesleff, Irma (2003-05-01). "Epithelial-mesenchymal signalling regulating tooth morphogenesis". Journal of Cell Science. 116 (9): 1647–1648. doi:10.1242/jcs.00410. ISSN 0021-9533. PMID 12665545.
- Jernvall, Jukka; Thesleff, Irma (2000). "Reiterative signaling and patterning during mammalian tooth morphogenesis". Mechanisms of Development. 92 (1): 19–29. doi:10.1016/S0925-4773(99)00322-6. PMID 10704885.

== Awards and honors ==
Thesleff was named a member of the European Molecular Biology Organization in 2000, an elected fellow of the American Association for the Advancement of Science in 2008, and elected member of the United States National Academy of Medicine in 2014, an Academician of Science by the Academy of Finland in 2014, and a Foreign Associate of the United States' National Academy of Sciences in 2017.

Thesleff received the Anders Jahres Award for Medical Research from University of Oslo in 1999. In 2008, she received the Isaac Shour Memorial Award from the International Association for Dental Research. She has received honorary doctorates from the University of Göteborg, University of Copenhagen, McGill University, Katholieke Universiteit Leuven, University of Debrecen, University of Oslo, and Karolinska Institutet.
