= Rubén Carolini =

Argentine paleontologist (1944–2023)

- Born: Rubén Darío Carolini; 29 April 1944; Oncativo, Argentina
- Died: 9 September 2023 (aged 79); Cipolletti, Argentina
- Known for: Discoverer of the Giganotosaurus
- Scientific career
- Fields: Paleontology

Rubén Darío Carolini (29 April 1944 – 9 September 2023) was an Argentine paleontologist. He was the discoverer of the Giganotosaurus.

== Biography ==
Carolini was born in Oncativo, Córdoba, on 29 April 1944, where he lived during his childhood and youth. At the end of the 1960s he began working as a mechanic on the construction site of the El Chocón dam in the Neuquén and later continued working at Hidronor S.A., the public company that managed the hydroelectric plant of that dam.

Parallel to his work as a mechanic, he dedicated himself as an amateur to the search for fossils in the Cretaceous sites around Chocón, always in contact with palaeontologists in the area, mainly from the University of Comahue and the Plaza Huincul Museum. He made several discoveries of very important fossil remains, among which the carcharodontosaurid theropod dinosaur Giganotosaurus stands out, found in 1993. Carolini was one of the main promoters of the creation of the Ernesto Bachmann Paleontological Museum in Villa El Chocón, Neuquén, and served as its director from its foundation in 1995 until 2008.

He died in Cipolletti, Río Negro, on 9 September 2023, at the age of 79.
