= Neogene of the Old World =

Database related to natural history

Neogene of the Old World is a database containing information about Eurasian Miocene to Pleistocene land mammal taxa and localities, with emphasis on the European Miocene and Pliocene.

NOW began as a clone of the ETE ("Evolution of Terrestrial Ecosystems") database originally developed by John Damuth and the ETE Consortium, and most species and locality data fields follow the definitions described in the ETE manual. NOW is limited in scope to Cenozoic land mammals, so naturally uses only part of the complex possibilities embodied in the ETE design. Some fields have been added to suit the purposes of the NOW database, and some existing fields have been adapted.

As a guideline NOW uses the taxonomy of McKenna & Bell's Classification of Mammals Above the Species Level, except for Muridae for which we use McKenna & Bell's classification with the modifications suggested by Hans de Bruijn.

The NOW database is maintained and coordinated at the University of Helsinki by Mikael Fortelius in collaboration with an international advisory board.
