= Ilmari Välikangas =

Finnish hydrobiologist and ornithologist

Ilmari Välikangas born Buddén (5 December 1884 – 2 July 1959) was a Finnish hydrobiologist and ornithologist who worked as a professor of zoology at the University of Helsinki. He was also curator of the zoological museum of the university.

Välikangas was born in Tampere to Emil Johannes Buddén and Johanna Augusta Granit. Until 1906 he went by the surname Buddén. His brother Eino Välikangas became an ambassador while another brother Martti Välikangas became an architect. He became interested in sea life and studied under Kaarlo Mainio Levander, a pioneer of plankton studies in Helsinki. In 1926 Välikangas received a doctorate for his work on marine plankton around Helsinki, including their use for monitoring pollution. Along with Ernst Häyrén he was involved in long-term monitoring of the health of the water. He became a curator at the zoological museum of the University of Helsinki in 1919. In 1938 he became a professor of zoology at the university. He conducted bird ringing in Finland. In 1933 he conducted experiments translocating the eggs of non-migratory mallards from England and hatching them in Finland where they joined the local mallard flocks in winter suggesting that migration might be learnt or socially influenced. In 1924 he helped found the Finnish ornithological society and served as its chairman from 1935 to 1948.
