= Natural History Museum of Helsinki =

Coordinates: 60°10′17″N 24°55′53″E

Natural History Museum
- Helsingin luonnontieteellinen museo
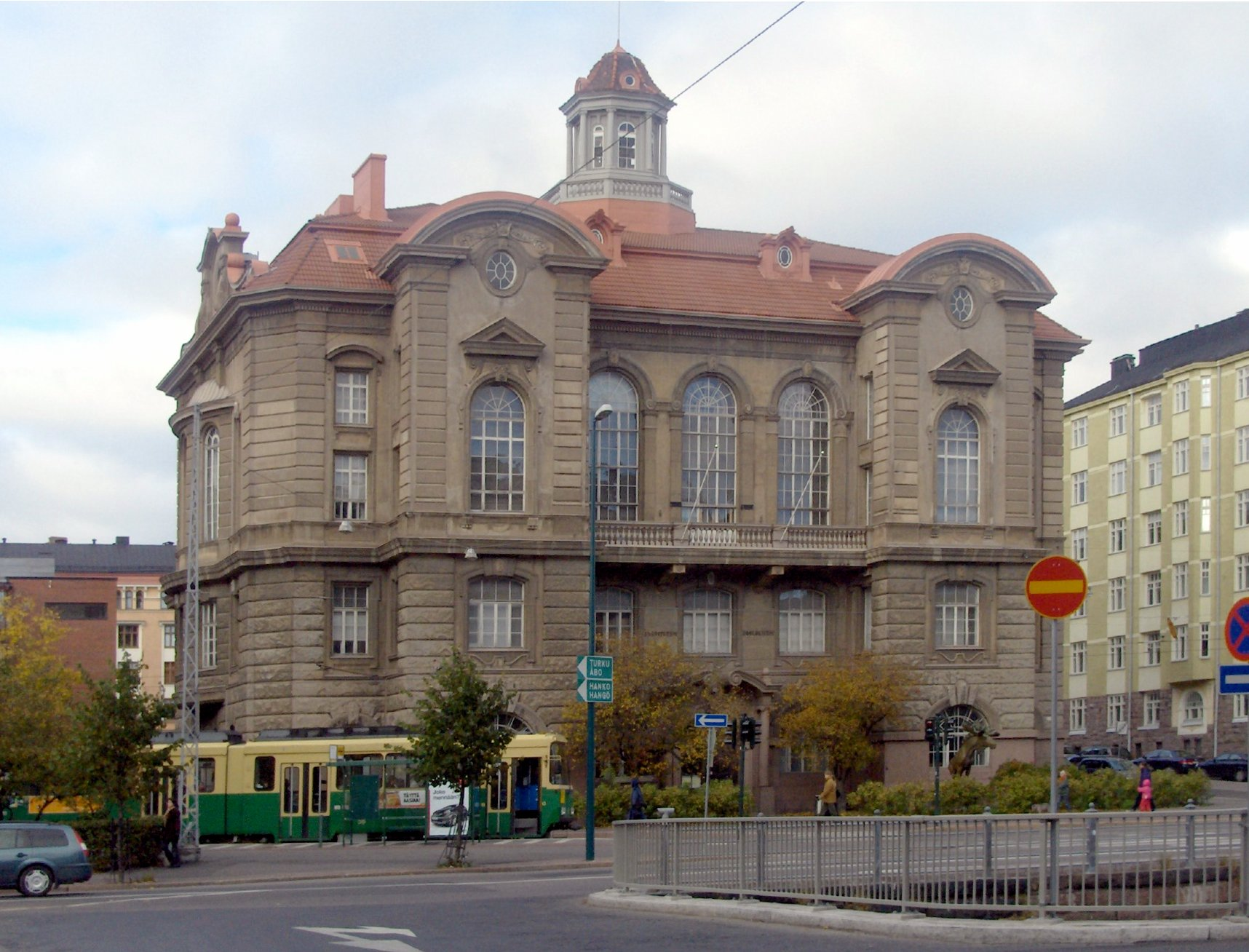
- Natural History Museum, Helsinki
- Established: 1924
- Location: Helsinki
- Type: Natural history museum
- Website: www.luomus.fi/english/

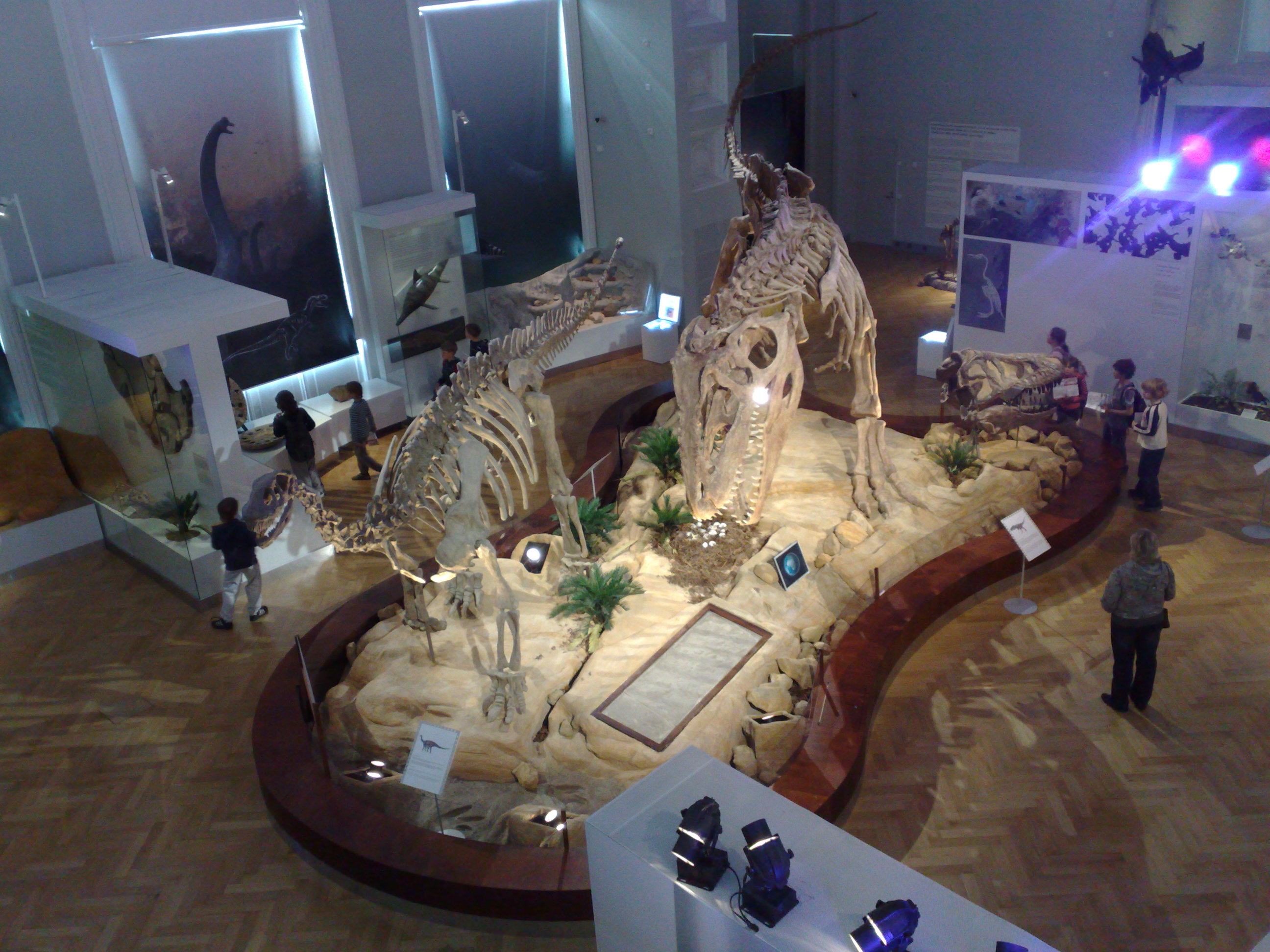
Dinosaur skeletons in the museum.

The Natural History Museum (Finnish: Luonnontieteellinen museo, Swedish: Naturhistoriska museet) is one of the museums under the directorship of the Finnish Museum of Natural History, part of the University of Helsinki, in Helsinki, Finland.

== History of the museum ==
The building that houses the museum, located on Arkadiankatu and Pohjoinen Rautatiekatu in central Helsinki, was built in 1913. It was originally built for the Alexander Lyceum, a Russian-speaking cadet school, where the pupils were distinguished by their military-type uniforms. The building was designed by two Russian architects, Lev P. Chichko and M.G. Chayko, and the architecture is unusually flamboyant, especially the main stairs. After Finnish independence in 1918 the building became a Finnish cadet school. When the school vacated the building in 1923 it was obtained by the University of Helsinki and converted for use as a zoological museum. Its first collections were based on donations to the University of Helsinki from a private society called Societas pro Fauna et Flora.

=== Spider infestation ===
The museum building has been infested with a population of Loxosceles laeta (Chilean recluse spider) since the early 1960s. Though the species is considered by many to be the most dangerous of the venomous recluse spiders, there has been only one minor, non-fatal biting incident at the museum thus far. While ecologist Veikko Huhta theorized that the Chilean recluse first arrived in fruit shipments from Argentina, museum senior curator Jyrki Muona offers the alternative explanation that the spider arrived in wood chips used for a live rodent enclosure.

== Exhibition displays ==
The museum displays taxidermed animals, skeletons, remains of prehistoric animals, and minerals. The first floor houses a bone exhibition. In the upper floors are exhibitions of Finnish nature, the nature of the world, and the history of life. The moose statue in front of the museum has become the symbol of the museum. The lobby hall is dominated by a taxidermed African elephant. The museum also has a cafe and a souvenir shop. The total floor area of the museum is around 8,000 square metres (86,000 ft^{2}).
