= Eino Wälikangas =

Finnish diplomat

Eino Wälikangas (his surname until 1906 was Buddén) (11 October 1889 – 1960) was a Finnish diplomat.

== Early life ==
Wälikangas was born in Savonlinna, the son of E.J. Buddén and Johanna Augusta Granit. He graduated from secondary school in 1907 and graduated with a Bachelor of Philosophy in 1914.

== Career ==
Wälikangas was a curator of the Savonian Society from 1916 to 1918 and taught Sanskrit in 1915 and 1919 at the University of Helsinki. He was an Officer of the Foreign Affairs Office in Vaasa in 1918, and the archivist in the Ministry for Foreign Affairs from 1919 to 1922.

He was the Deputy Secretary in Berlin from 1920 to 1921. He also received the Counselors' title in 1921.

He served as the Head of the Department of Personnel and Administration at the Ministry of Foreign Affairs from 1923 to 1927, when he became the Secretary of the London Office. He also ran the office in Washington in 1933.

Wälikangas was the Finnish envoy to many cities between 1934 and 1937, including Buenos Aires and Santiago. He also became the Finnish envoy in Rio de Janeiro from 1937 to 1945. He was on non-active status from 1945 to 1947 and on special assignment from 1947 to 1949. He was the rapporteur for foreign ambassadors from 1949 to 1956.
