= Mikael Fortelius =

Finnish paleontologist (born 1954)

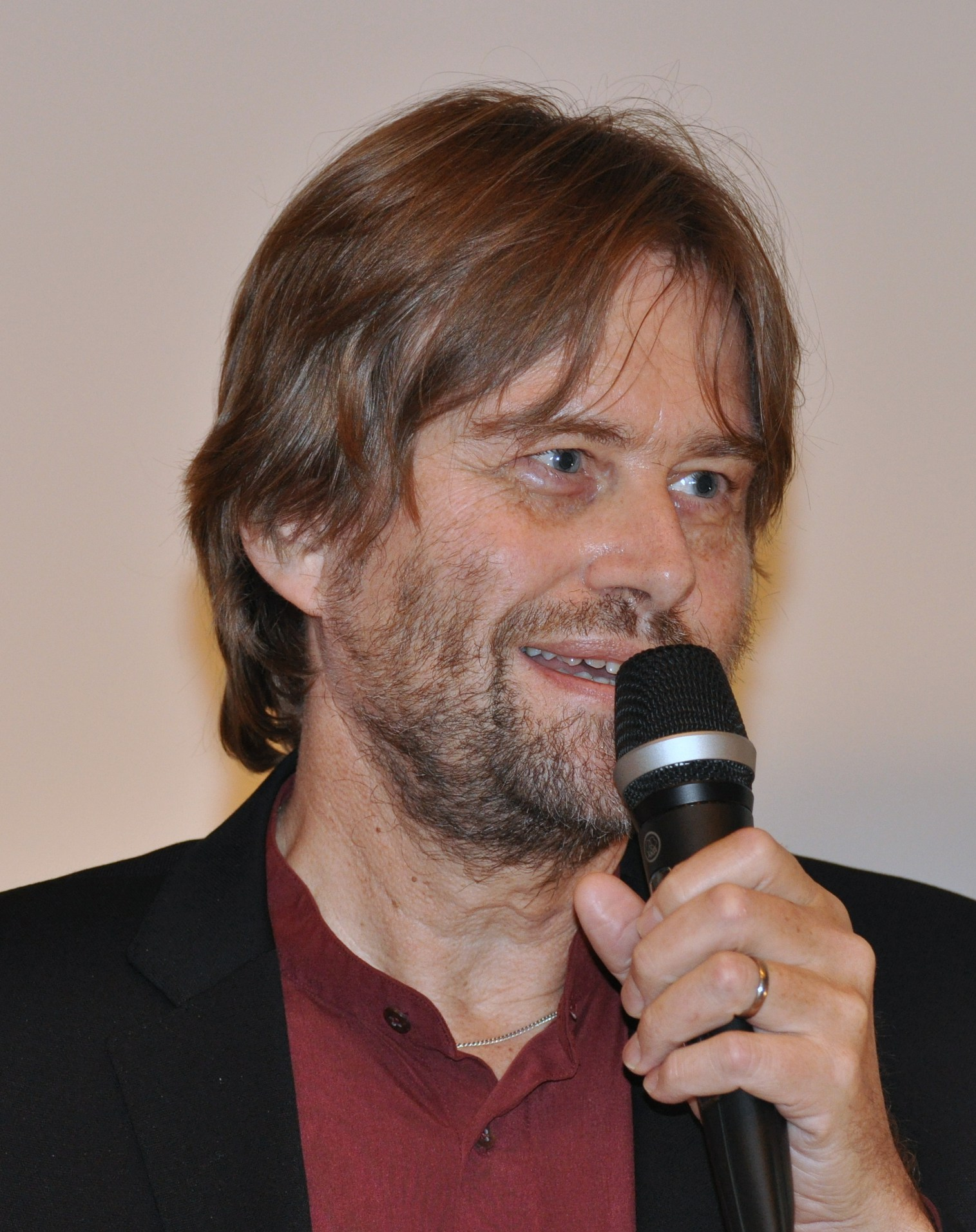
Mikael Fortelius in 2012.

Mikael Fortelius (born 1 February 1954) is a professor of evolutionary palaeontology at the University of Helsinki and the coordinator of the Neogene of the Old World database of fossil mammals. His research involves the evolution of Eurasian land mammals and terrestrial environments during the Neogene, ecomorphology of ungulates, developmental biology, the function and evolution of mammalian teeth, and scaling problems (changes in size with growth or as species evolve). He is an expert on indricotheres. He has authored and co-authored a number of papers in peer-reviewed international journals as well as articles on popular science and other published material. He is married to Asta Irene Rosenström, and he has three children.
