= Aphnelepis =

Aphnelepis Temporal range: Tithonian, ~151 Ma

Scientific classification
- Kingdom: Animalia
- Phylum: Chordata
- Class: Actinopterygii
- Division: Teleostei
- Family: †Archaeomaenidae
- Genus: †Aphnelepis; Woodward, 1895
- Species: †A. australis

Binomial name
- †Aphnelepis australis Woodward, 1895

Extinct genus of fishes

Aphnelepis is an extinct genus of prehistoric freshwater ray-finned fish that lived during the Late Jurassic epoch. It contains a single species, A. australis, from the Talbragar River beds of New South Wales, Australia.

Initially described as a "semionotiform", it is now generally recovered as a basal teleostean related to the sympatric Archaeomaene. Some studies classify it in its own family, Aphnelepidae, which is sister to Aetheolepis, with both families together being sister to Archaeomaenidae. However, Aphnelepidae is considered synonymous with Archaeomaenidae by other authorities.

== See also ==
- Prehistoric fish
- List of prehistoric bony fish
