= Oreochima =

Oreochima Temporal range: Toarcian 180–176 Ma

Scientific classification
- Kingdom: Animalia
- Phylum: Chordata
- Class: Actinopterygii
- Division: Teleostei
- Family: †Archaeomaenidae
- Genus: †Oreochima; Schaeffer & Elliot, 1972
- Species: †O. ellioti

Binomial name
- †Oreochima ellioti Schaeffer & Elliot, 1972

Extinct genus of ray-finned fishes

Oreochima is an archaeomaenid ray-finned fish from Lower Jurassic-aged freshwater strata of Queen Alexandra Range, Antarctica. Fossils come from the Lower Jurassic Mawson Formation (Toarcian) of Storm Peak, Antarctica, where a freshwater lake system, called "Lake Carapace", once existed. O. ellioti is also notable for being one of few archaeomaenid genera found outside of Australia, as well for be one of the oldest members of the family.

== Description ==
Two nearly complete specimens of Oreochima ellioti (specimens AMNH 9910 and AMNH 9916) have an average total length of about 60 mm, with incomplete specimens representing individuals of similar size. The frontals taper anteriorly and were slightly notched where they were in contact with the nasals. The opercular bone was about twice as high as the subopercular.

== Phylogeny ==
The cladogram below is simplified after a phylogenetic analysis by Bean (2021). Archaeomaenidae was recovered as one of the most basal stem-teleost clades, lying crownward of the families Pachycormidae and Aspidorhynchidae, but stemward of the family Pholidophoridae:

- Teleosteomorpha
  - Pachycormidae
  - - Aspidorhynchidae
    - Teleostei
      - Archaeomaenidae
        - Archaeomaene
        - - Gurvanichthys
          - Wadeichthys
          - - Oreochima
            - Zaxilepis
      - - Pholidophoridae
        - - Prohalecites
          - - Eurycormus
            - - Ankylophoridae
              - - Ichthyokentema
                - - Dorsetichthys
                  - - Leptolepis
                    - - Ascalaboidae
                      - - Varasichthyidae
                        - Crown group Teleostei

== Paleoenvironment ==
The Mawson Formation represents the fossiliferous interbeds of the Kirkpatrick Basalt, part of the Ferrar Group volcanic events, with age constraint in between 180+/-3.5 Ma-176.6+/-1.8 Ma, well correlated with the evolution of the Ferrar Large Igneous Province during the initial breakup of Gondwana. This layers record sedimentary and biotic processes in relatively shallow lakes and ponds, and in surrounding wetlands to upland areas, with the biota of the lakes having access to magmatic sources. The so called "Lake Carapace", the main water body recovered locally, was, like the "Chacritas Paleolake" of the sister Cañadón Asfalto Formation in Patagonia, developed following the local rift in a similar way to the modern Lake Magadi in the Kenyan Rift Valley, as proven by the discovery of Chert like the one found in this African lake, that suggests both, Carapace and Chacritas were likely alkaline lakes that had inflows of hydrothermal fluids. Hydrothermal activity help the development of microbes (Archaea) and helping the fauna on cooler events. Alongside Oreochima lived the spinicaudatan Carapacestheria disgregaris, notostracan branchiopods, ostracoda, up to 50 specimens of insect nymphs and wings (mayflies, the dragonfly Caraphlebia antartica, and a Coleopteran). and plant leaves (Zamites).

== See also ==
- List of prehistoric bony fish genera
