= Talbragar Fossil Fish Bed =

Protected area in New South Wales, Australia

- Stratigraphic range: Late Jurassic (Kimmeridgian); ~151 Ma
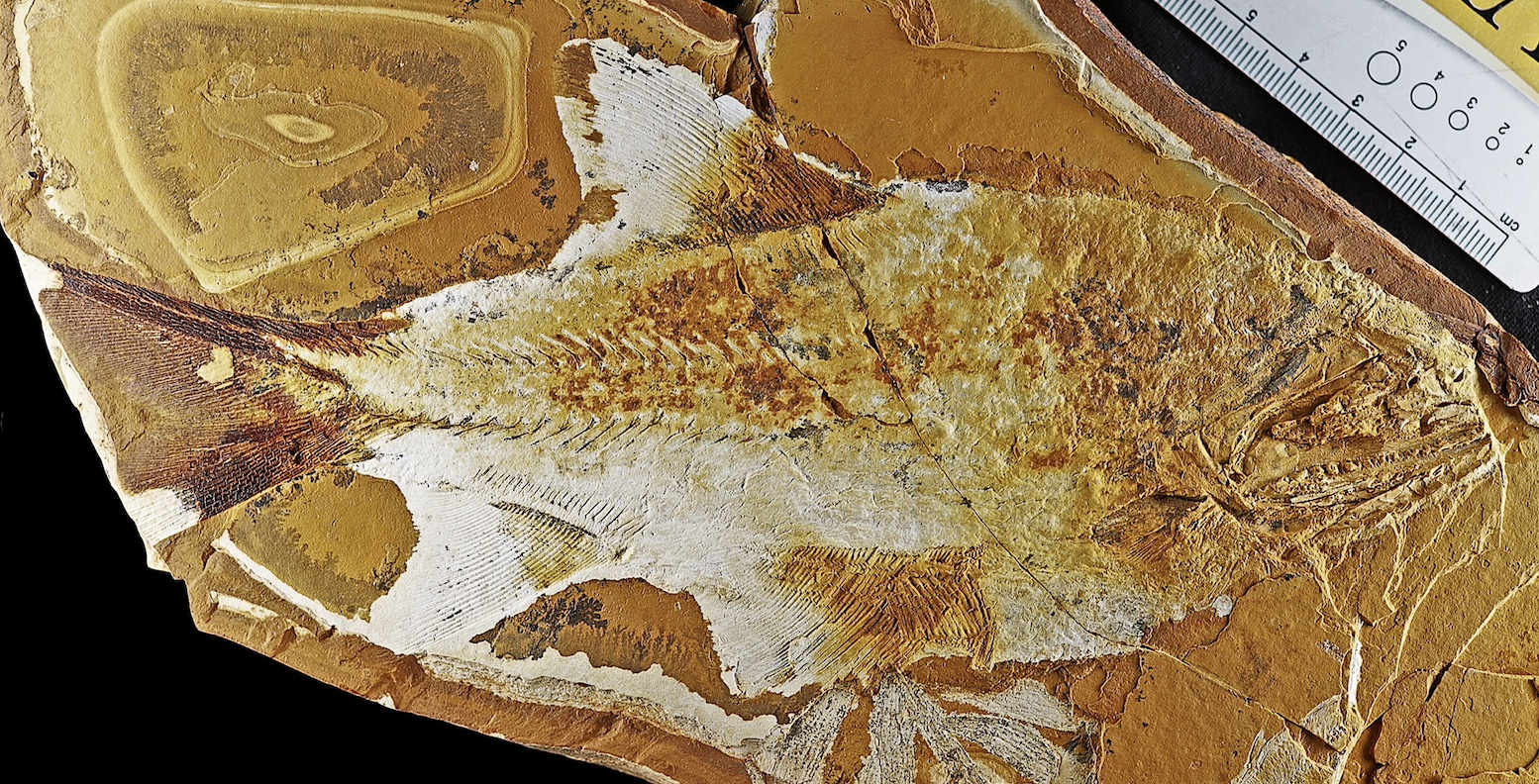
- Cacatualepis australis from the site.
- Type: Konservat-Lagerstätte
- Overlies: Hawkesbury Sandstone
- Thickness: 1.5 metres (4.9 ft)

Lithology
- Primary: Sandstone, siltstone
- Other: Clay

Location
- Coordinates: 32.1644°S 149.68375°E
- Region: New South Wales
- Country: Australia

Type section
- Named for: Talbragar River
- Talbragar Fossil Fish Bed (Australia) Talbragar Fossil Fish Bed (New South Wales)

The Talbragar Fossil Fish Bed (or Talbragar Fish Bed) is a paleontological site in New South Wales, Australia, dating to the Kimmeridgian age of the Late Jurassic. Material has been collected from the beds for over a century with the beds first being found in 1889. These beds are most likely the uppermost layer of the Purlawaugh Formation though the beds do overlie the Hawkesbury Sandstone. Since being first mentioned in the literature, a number of fossil fish and plants have been described from the locality. Though not as well studied as the other groups due to most work on the beds being done at the northern site, a large number of insects have also been found. The beds themselves represent a shallow, relatively short-lived lake. During this time, the ecosystem would have been on hot and humid. The fossils were preserved due to a two-phase volcanic event with the ash from these events filling up the shallow lake.

== History ==
The Talbragar Fossil Fish Bed was first found by Arthur Lowe in 1889 with the first mention of the site in the literature being by Woodward in 1895. Charles Cullen later collecting a number of fish fossils from the site for the NSW Mines Department. These specimens would later be described by authors such as Woodward and Wade. Along with these fossil fish, a single insect would also be collected in 1968 by I. Holswich, though the preservation was more poor than what was seen in the fish. A year later, the first detailed investigation of the beds would be done by Dulhunty & Eadie who were the first to notice the eroded nature of the fish beds. Over the next two decades after this discovery, numerous other insect fossils were collected from the site representing a number of orders. Due to the site being within a paddock used for grazing on private property, not much work has been done though Lynne Bean was able to collect specimens in 2006. Over the next 5 years, a total of twenty weekend collection field trips were made resulting in over 400 insect specimens being collected. In 2021, the first tetrapod material was described from the beds; this material being a single tooth from a temnospondyl.

The name "Talbragar Fossil Fish Bed" was a general name of the site though it was put into publication as an informal name by Dulhuntly and Eadie in 1969 with this name deriving from the nearby Talbragar River.

== Geology ==
The Talbragar Fossil Fish Bed is located around 14 kilometres (8.7 mi) north-northwest of Ulan, New South Wales and is 0.5–1.5 metres (1.6–4.9 ft) in thickness. The unit itself is made up of sandstone and tuffaceous siltstone with the original extent of the unit being larger than what is seen today. This is due to erosion at both the northern and southern ends along with faulting present along the eastern boundary. Unweathered samples from the beds are grey and very fine grained. Within these samples, there are a number of minerals such as igneous quartz. The strata within the bed also lack a sedimentary flow structure. The Talbragar Fossil Fish Bed Reserve itself is on a slope of a hill and measures about 275 metres (902 ft) long with its widest point being about 100 metres (330 ft). Originally, the fossil beds were believed to date to the late early or middle Jurassic based on the flora which correlated it with the nearby Purlawaugh Formation. However, more recent dating of the site using zircon crystals suggests that the age is more likely Kimmeridgian making the site younger than the known dating of the known Purlawaugh Formation. Even with this being the case, it has been suggested that the Talbragar Fossil Fish Bed is the upper unit of the Purlawaugh Formation. The beds themselves overlie the Hawkesbury Sandstone, a formation dating to the middle Triassic. The fish bed as a whole is divided into two sites being the northern and southern sites with the stratigraphy and biota differing between the two.

=== Northern Site ===
The northern site of the Talbragar Fossil Fish Bed is where most work has been done with most of this work being done a few meters to the south of the excavations done between 2006 and 2011. Though authors originally thought that fossiliferous layers only had a thickness of 600 millimetres (2.0 ft), more recent work has revealed that these fossiliferous layers have a total thickness of around 1.1 metres (3.6 ft).

Layer	Geology	Thickness	Fossil content of the layer
A	White-yellow stained chert	About 100 millimetres (3.9 in)	Completely unfossiliferous
B	Yellow-white stained, tuffaceous siltstone	Up to 300 millimetres (12 in)	Mostly fish though a number of insects and plant fragments have been found
C	Yellow-stained sandstone	400 millimetres (16 in)	Plant fragments
D	Undulating tuffaceous siltstone and medium- to course-grained sandy layers with clayballs	500–700 millimetres (20–28 in)	Poorly-preserved fish

=== Southern Site ===
The southern region of the Talbragar Fossil Fish Bed is not as well exposed as the northern site due to it being covered in soil and is about 0.5 metres (1.6 ft) thick. Though separated from the northern site, the strata that is exposed is believed to be equivalent to the upper layers of the northern site. The section at the southern site is made up of tuffaceous siltstone that is more course near the base with ranges from 0.3–1.5 metres (0.98–4.92 ft) below the surface. The fossils found in this area are within a disrupted layer of blocks with this disruption being caused by a dense forest that was present in the area in the 1800s. Below these blocks, the stratum is very finely laminated and slightly warped with very little insect and trace fossils. The basal-most layer however is very fossiliferous, containing a large amount of plant, trace, and invertebrate fossils. Unlike the northern site, the fish skeletons at the southern site are much less complete.

=== Fossil Composition ===
The chemical composition of the fossils at the Talbragar Fossil Fish Bed differ from the surrounding matrix. Outside of three elements, the composition of the fish fossils are transitional between what is seen in the matrix and plant fossils. Both plant and fish fossils have specimens with what has been referred to as "dark matter" by studies. This "dark matter" is manganese infilling with the element forming dendrites in a plant fossil. Along with this, infilling is also seen in fractures and joints in fish fossils.

Type of Fossil	Composition compared to matrix
Plants	Lower amount of P, S, K, Cr, Al, Fe, Th, Mn Greater amount of Si
Fish	Lower amount of P, S, K, Cr, Al, Fe, Th, Mn, Ti Greater amount of Al, Mn, Si

== Paleobiota ==
=== Actinopterygii ===
Ray-finned fish recorded from the Talbragar Fossil Fish Bed
Genus	Species	Notes	Image
Aetheolepis	A. mirabilis	A dapediid with a deep body known from a single specimen with a poorly preserved head.	
Aphnelepis	A. australis	An archaeomaenid that is fusiform in shape with a maximum length of 12.5 centimetres (4.9 in).	
Archaeomaene	A. tenuis	An archaeomaenid with a rounded head and a small dorsal fin. The largest specimen from the beds is 17.5 centimetres (6.9 in) long. There was originally a second species noted within the beds (A. robustus) though the second species is now believed to represent the same species.	
Cacatualepis	C. australis	A coccolepidid that was originally described as a species of Coccolepis though was later reassigned to its own genus due to a redefinition of the original genus. Within the beds, an ontogenetic series is observed with specimens measuring 4–35 centimetres (1.6–13.8 in) being found.	
Cavenderichthys	C. talbragarensis	A short-faced leptolepidid ranging between 4–12 centimetres (1.6–4.7 in) in length. This fish is the most common fish taxon found within the beds.	
Uarbryichthys	U. latus	An uarbryichthyid macrosemiiform that reaches a standard length of about 26 centimetres (10 in). Like other members of the family, it was a deep-bodied fish with a single long dorsal fin running across the length of the body.	

=== Arachnida ===
Arachnids recorded from the Talbragar Fossil Fish Bed
Genus	Species	Notes	Image
Talbragaraneus	T. jurassicus	A potential uloborid spider identified as either a female or a juvenile individual. It would have most likely lived on vegetation on the margin of the lake.	

=== Bivalvia ===
Bivalves recorded from the Talbragar Fossil Fish Bed
Genus	Species	Notes	Image
Protosphaerium	P. gianae	A sphaeriid with a short hinge. Due to the teeth of the clam being unknown, it is placed within the family due to its "pea-clam" shape and small size.: Specimens of P. talbragarensis range from 6.9–11.5 millimetres (0.27–0.45 in) in length. The hinge is this species is small in lateral profile.; Specimens of P. gianae range from 5.7–9 millimetres (0.22–0.35 in) in length. This hinge is long and possesses a single lateral tooth.	
Protosphaerium	P. talbragarensis	A sphaeriid with a short hinge. Due to the teeth of the clam being unknown, it is placed within the family due to its "pea-clam" shape and small size.: Specimens of P. talbragarensis range from 6.9–11.5 millimetres (0.27–0.45 in) in length. The hinge is this species is small in lateral profile.; Specimens of P. gianae range from 5.7–9 millimetres (0.22–0.35 in) in length. This hinge is long and possesses a single lateral tooth.	

=== Chondrichthyes ===
Chondrichthyans recorded from the Talbragar Fossil Fish Bed
Genus	Species	Notes	Image
Elasmobranchii indet.		An incomplete body fossil of a juvenile shark probably preserving two ventral fins and the lower lobe of the tail.	

=== Gastropoda ===
Gstropods recorded from the Talbragar Fossil Fish Bed
Genus	Species	Notes	Image
Proviviparus	P. talbragarensis	A small viviparid snail that possessed a thin operculum along with brooded embryos. This makes it so the species is the first Mesozoic member of the family to have both of these features preserved.	

=== Insecta ===
Insects recorded from the Talbragar Fossil Fish Bed
Genus	Species	Notes	Image
Austroprotolindenia	A. jurassica	A protolindeniid dragonfly with a total wing length of the species is 39.0 millimetres (1.54 in). This genus is the only member of the family present in the southern hemisphere.	
Beattieellus	B. jurassicus	An eucnemid with a body length of 4.7 millimetres (0.19 in). At the time of description, this genus was an oldest described member of the family.	
Calosargus	C. talbragarensis	An archisargid fly known from a disarticulated wing measuring 6 millimetres (0.24 in). Though the species is represented by a single wing, other members of the group have been suggested to be parasitic based on the presence of a long ovipositor. Similar to members of Syrphidae, these flies were most likely able to hover.	
Eotipula	E. grangeri	A small limoniid crane fly known from a body fossil measuring 6.5 millimetres (0.26 in). It is most likely that this taxon would have lived similar to it modern relatives with males forming swarms around bodies of water.	
Gulgonga	G. beattiei	A praeaulacid wasp known from a body fossil, the wings of the insect would have measured 4.1 millimetres (0.16 in), making it a large member of the family.	
Juroglypholoma	J. talbragarense	A large glypholomatine rove beetle with a body length of 4.3 millimetres (0.17 in). The elytra are smaller than other members in the subfamily with four segments of the abdomen being exposed.	
Talbragarocossus	T. jurassicus	A palaeontinid cicadomorph known from a body fossil with forewing measuring 35 millimetres (1.4 in) long. It differs from other earlier members of the group due to the anatomy of the forewings and the smaller size of the hindwings. More recent papers have placed this genus as a member of the 'late palaeontinidae' which have triangular forewings and smaller hindwings.	
Talbragarus	T. averyi	A nemonychid weevil with a body length (excluding the rostrum) of 8.5–9.5 millimetres (0.33–0.37 in). Members of the family are commonly found with conifers which are one of the more common groups of plants found within the fish beds.	
Telmatomyia	T. talbragarica	A chironomid known from seven specimens, all being pupas. These pupas are large for the family, being between 9–14 millimetres (0.35–0.55 in) long. Similar to a number of modern fly larvae, the pupa have a suction disk.	
Protochares	P. brevipalpis	A medium-sized hydrophilid with an oval-shaped body measuring 7.6 millimetres (0.30 in).	
Protachinus	P. minor	A small tachyporine rove beetle with a body length of 4.1 millimetres (0.16 in).	
Talbragaropsyllidium	T. averyi	A protopsyllidiid hemipteran with a slender body measuring 5.18 millimetres (0.204 in). The genus is the most common insect within the fossil beds and is the first Jurassic member of the family to be found in Gondwana.	
Rhopalomma	R. stefaniae	An ommatid with an elongated body measuring 7 millimetres (0.28 in) that would have most likely lived in rotten wood based on extant relatives. The description of this genus makes Australia the only continent with both extinct and extant members of the family.	
Wongaroo	W. amplipectorale	A cerophytid beetle with a body length of 6–6.5 millimetres (0.24–0.26 in). In the modern day, some members of this family live in similar, tropical environments.	

=== Temnospondyli ===
Temnospondyls recorded from the Talbragar Fossil Fish Bed
Genus	Species	Notes	Image
Temnospondyli indet.		An indeterminate temnospondyl known from a single tooth that is different in morphology to Siderops, the only Jurassic member of the group from the region. The recurve on this tooth is not as prominent as on the named genus.	

=== Conifers ===
Conifers recorded from the Talbragar Fossil Fish Bed
Genus	Species	Notes	Image
Allocladus	A. cribbii	A leaf form described as triangular leaves from conifers. However, a study of the cuticles of Allocladus could suggest that these leaves could actually be from another group of plants.: (A. cribbii) Triangular conifer leaves, each leaf being a max of 5 millimetres (0.20 in) long and 3 millimetres (0.12 in) wide. Unlike the other species at the site, no hypodermis was seen in collected specimens. Within the beds, the leaves of this species were originally described as "Brachyphyllum".; (A. milneanus) Triangular conifer leavers, each leaf being a max of 8 millimetres (0.31 in) long and 3 millimetres (0.12 in) wide. Unlike the other species at the site, a hypodermis with cuticles has been preserved. Within the beds, the leaves of this species were originally described as "Pagiophyllum peregrinum".	
Allocladus	A. milneanus		
Elatocladus	E. australis	A leaf form of conifers with flattened leaves measuring at most 10 millimetres (0.39 in) long, it is a rare leaf form taxa within the deposit. The species has been found at a number of sites in Gondwana including in Antarctica and Argentina.	
Podozamites/Agathis	P/A. jurassica	A large leaf form a conifer in the family Araucariaceae that was originally described under the name "Podozamites lanceolatus". There are also female cones and male cone scales from the family preserved with the leaves. This species for a period of time referred to as a species of Agathis.	
Rissikia	?R. talbragarensis	A seed cone from a conifer genus mostly known from the Triassic localities. The cones measure 12 centimetres (4.7 in) in length and only have one seed in their ovuliferous complexes. Due to the poor preservation of the cones, more recent authors are unsure if the material belongs in the certain genus. Associated foliage has been referred to as "Elatocladus planus".	

=== Corystospermales ===
Corystospermales recorded from the Talbragar Fossil Fish Bed
Genus	Species	Notes	Image
Komlopteris	K. purlawaughensis	A leaf form of a "seed fern" within the family Umkomasiaceae with members of the genus being present throughout South America, Asia, Antarctica, and Australia. The leaves on the frond reach a length of 12.6 centimetres (5.0 in) and a width of 11 centimetres (4.3 in). These leaves are paripinnate or imparipinnate. These leaves were assigned to Thinnfeldia talbragarensis though differed enough to be assigned to a different genus.	
Pachypteris	P. crassa	A leaf of a "seed fern" with members of the genus being present throughout South America, Eurasia, and Australia. The frons of the plant ranged between 3–10 centimetres (1.2–3.9 in). Within the site, leaves originally attributed to "Thinnfeldia pinnata" were later assigned to this taxa when the species were synomized. The leaves are associated with the pollen organ Pteruchus petasatus.	

=== Cycadophytes ===
Cycads recorded from the Talbragar Fossil Fish Bed
Genus	Species	Notes	Image
Nilssonia	N. compta	A widespread form of cycad in the family Nilssoniaceae, the only specimen from the site being a small frond. Though not found at the fish beds, the pollen cone Androstrobus manis has been found in association with the leaf form. This association has caused authors to suggest that they are from the same parent plant.	

=== Lycopodiales ===
Lycopodiopsids recorded from the Talbragar Fossil Fish Bed
Genus	Species	Notes	Image
Selaginella	S. sp	A member of Selaginellaceae known from a single specimen of a branching plant with small leaves.	

=== Pentoxylales ===
Pentoxylales recorded from the Talbragar Fossil Fish Bed
Genus	Species	Notes	Image
Carnoconites	C. spp	A number of pentoxylale female cones associated with the form genus Pentoxylon. The genus is also found at other sites at similar paleolatitudes along with climates in places like New Zealand. These cones have been found preserved near leaves and pollen from the same group. Though not an angiosperm, the cone has been called a "flower" in the past.	
Sahnia	S. spp	A number of pentoxylale pollen organs or male cone. The genus is also found in more equatorial regions like the Indian Rajmahal Formation.	
Taeniopteris	T. spp	A pentoxylale leaf form that have been associated with the form genus Pentoxylon. The genus is also found at other sites at similar paleolatitudes along with climates in places like New Zealand. These leaves have also been found preserved near ovulate organs and pollen from plants of the same group.	

=== Polypodiopsida ===
Ferns recorded from the Talbragar Fossil Fish Bed
Genus	Species	Notes	Image
Cladophlebis	C. australis	A fern leaf form known from 10 fossils from the beds. It has been suggested that this material could be synonymous with C. sp. cf. C. oblonga due to the shape and insertion angles of the pinnules.	
Coniopteris	C. hymenophylloides	A fern leaf form within the family Dicksoniaceae known from 27 fossils from the beds. Unlike extant members of the group, the genus as a whole most likely represented a herbaceous plant. C. hymenophylloides has also been found at the Yaojie Formation, a formation from China with a similar tropical climate to what is represented at the fish beds.	
Onychiopsis	O. sp	A fern leaf form within the family Dicksoniaceae. Though the material of the genus within the beds is very fragmentary, the fragment being only 1 centimetre (0.39 in) long, it is most similar to the species O. tenuiloba.	

=== Pteridospermatophyta ===
"Seed ferns" recorded from the Talbragar Fossil Fish Bed
Genus	Species	Notes	Image
Rintoulia	R. pinnata	A leaf form of uncertain affinity. Members of the genus are found throughout the Mesozoic of Gondwana including other sites in Australia.	

== Paleoenvironment ==
During the time of deposition, what is now the Talbragar Fossil Fish Bed would have been a shallow lake in a warm and humid environment. Due to the thickness of the unit and small amount of burrows found, it was most likely a short-lived, very shallow body of water that would have shoaled towards the southern section. This lake most likely did not last very long with Percival (1979) estimating a time period of about 250 years. The water in the lake would have been well oxygenated with a large amount of autotroph biomass based on what is found at the site. At least a part of the base of the food web would have been made up by fly larvae found at the bottom of the lake along with smaller fish species. Due to the amount of degraded fish found, mainly at the southern site, the shallowest areas were most likely made up of quiet backwater environments and isolated pools. Unlike modern lake ecosystems, it has been suggested that lake food webs were not regulated by larger aquatic plants. Based on coprolites at the site, fish were eating other fish, bivalves, and softer food such as soft invertebrates and plants. Surrounding the lake, it would have been forested with a number of different plant groups being present including pentoxylalean gymnosperms, araucariacean conifers, seed ferns, and true ferns. This shallow lake would have been covered by volcanic ash showers in the area. This event would have been made up by two phases with the first being made up of lahar with a second fall of ash causing the full infill of the lake.
