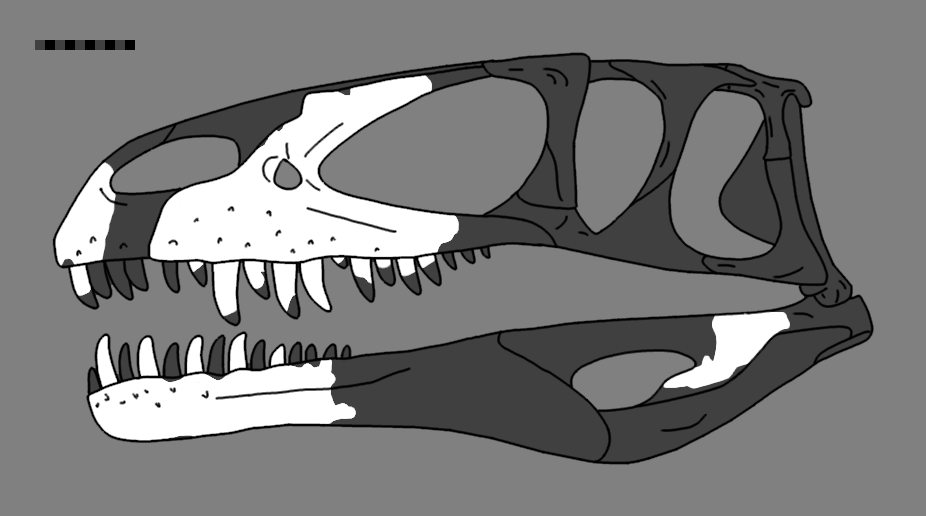
- Reconstruction of the skull with holotype elements shown in white

Scientific classification
- Kingdom: Animalia
- Phylum: Chordata
- Class: Reptilia
- Clade: Dinosauria
- Clade: Saurischia
- Clade: Theropoda
- Family: †Megalosauridae
- Subfamily: †Megalosaurinae
- Genus: †Duriavenator; Benson, 2008
- Species: †D. hesperis

Binomial name
- †Duriavenator hesperis (Waldman, 1974)

Synonyms
- Megalosaurus hesperis Waldman, 1974

= Duriavenator =

Duriavenator Temporal range: Bajocian 170–168 Ma

Genus of theropod dinosaur

Duriavenator is a genus of theropod dinosaur that lived in what is now England during the Middle Jurassic, about 168 million years ago. In 1882, upper and lower jaw bones of a dinosaur were collected near Sherborne in Dorset, and Richard Owen considered the fossils to belong to the species Megalosaurus bucklandii, the first named non-bird dinosaur. By 1964, the specimen was recognised as belonging to a different species, and in 1974 it was described as a new species of Megalosaurus, M. hesperis; the specific name means 'the West' or 'western'. Later researchers questioned whether the species belonged to Megalosaurus, in which many fragmentary theropods from around the world had historically been placed. After examining the taxonomic issues surrounding Megalosaurus, Roger B. J. Benson moved M. hesperis to its own genus in 2008, Duriavenator; this name means "Dorset hunter".

Estimated to have been 5–7 m (16–23 ft) long and weighed 1 t (2,200 lb), Duriavenator has been described as a medium-sized theropod. Duriavenator is distinct in features of the maxilla, the main bone of the upper jaw; it has a deep groove on the upper surface of the jugal process with numerous pneumatic (air-filled) foramina (openings), and small foramina on the lower part of the surface that connected with the premaxilla, the front bone of the upper jaw. It had about four teeth in the premaxilla, about 14–16 in the maxilla behind, and about 14–15 in the dentary of the lower jaw. While its classification was long uncertain, phylogenetic analyses in 2010 and onwards have shown it to be among the oldest tetanuran theropods (a diverse group that includes modern birds), and to belong in the family Megalosauridae. The long teeth at the front of the lower jaw may have been used for plucking and grasping during feeding. Duriavenator is known from the Upper Inferior Oolite Formation which is Bajocian in age, a stage in the Middle Jurassic.

== Discovery ==
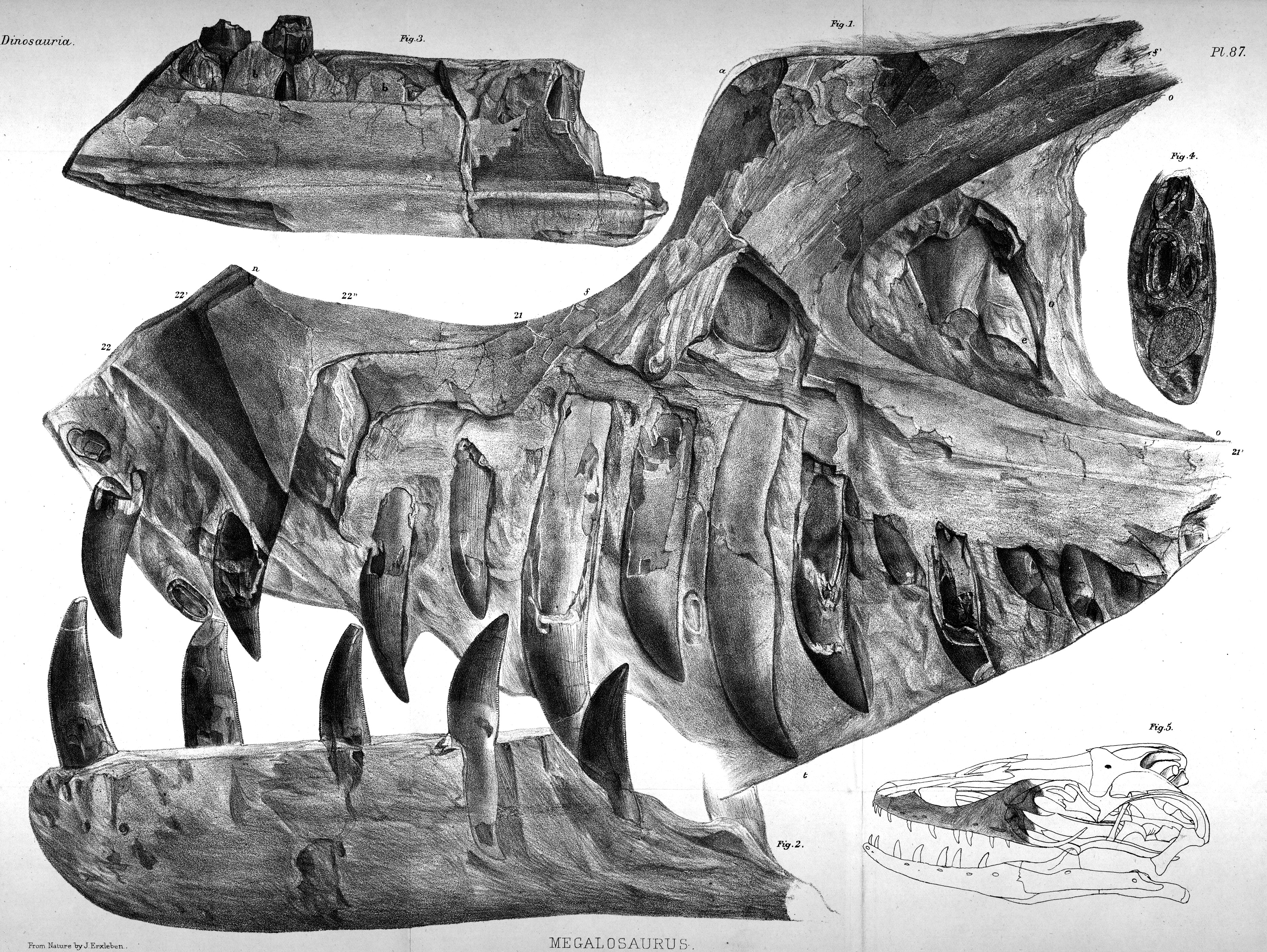
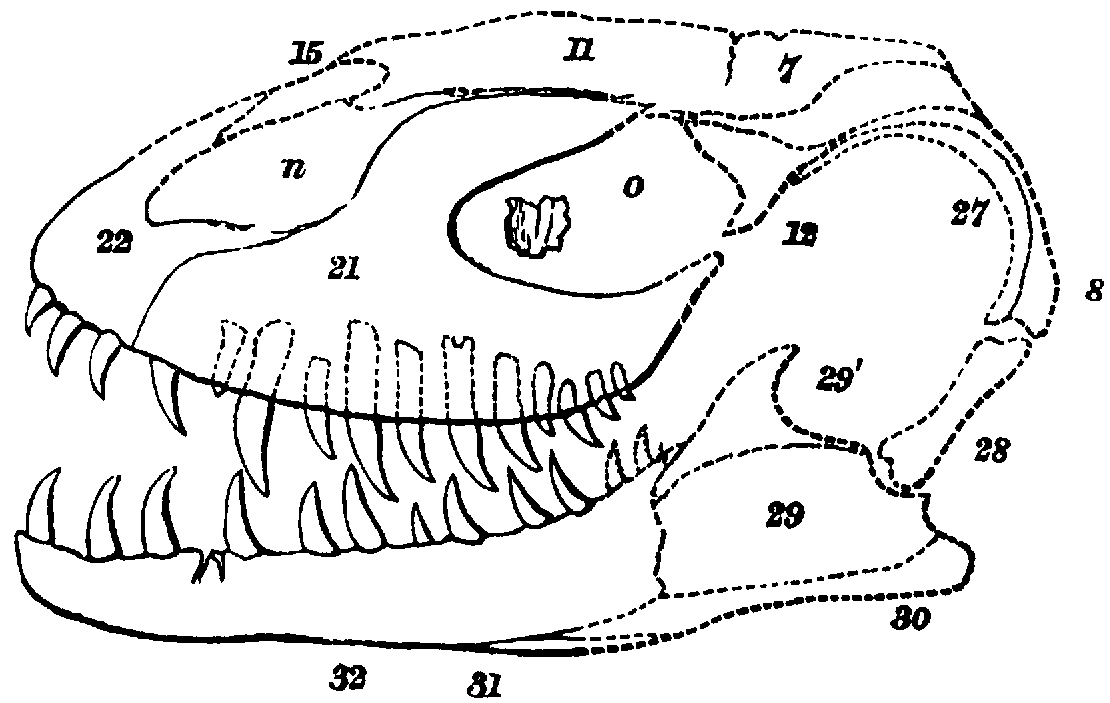
Lithograph of the holotype skull bones published by Richard Owen in the late 19th century (above), as well as his 1883 skull reconstruction of Megalosaurus bucklandii incorporating the fossils of Duriavenator (below, with solid lines)

In 1882, the British scientist and businessman Edward Cleminshaw obtained skull bones and teeth of a dinosaur from the freestone of the Inferior Oolite in Greenhill near Sherborne in Dorset, England. Blocks of the quarry-stone were being prepared for a building when Cleminshaw detected fossils embedded in them on cracked surfaces of the stones, and all such stones were withdrawn from the building yard. Cleminshaw presented the fossils at an 1882 meeting of the Dorset Natural History and Antiquarian Field Club, where he expressed hope that more remains would be found when the quarry had been worked, and that he would send them to the British naturalist Richard Owen for examination at the British Museum.

In 1883, Owen considered these fossils to have belonged to the species Megalosaurus bucklandii (using the now obsolete spelling M. bucklandi), which had been scientifically described and named in 1824, making it the first named non-bird dinosaur. Owen found the jaws of the then known Megalosaurus specimens to only differ in size, and due to the similarity of the teeth, thought there was no reason to divide them into different species. The skull of Megalosaurus was only known from fragments, so these new fossils aided Owen in producing a more complete reconstruction of it, incorporating the various specimens, guided by the skull of a monitor lizard. Owen believed the large opening behind the maxilla (the main bone of the upper jaw) to be the eye socket, while this is now known to be the antorbital fenestra, a large opening in front of the eye socket of many dinosaurs and their relatives.

The specimen (today catalogued as NHM R332 at the Natural History Museum in London, formerly BMNH) mainly consists of the front third of the skull, including the premaxillae (first bones of the upper jaw), the right maxilla, the front part of a vomer (a bone at the middle of the palate), both dentaries (the tooth-bearing part of the lower jaw), the fragmentary right surangular (a bone at the back of the lower jaw), fragmentary unidentified elements, and associated teeth. The maxilla is split into two slabs, with the front and hind margins broken, and the junction between the premaxilla and maxilla is covered in plaster. The right dentary is the most complete, while the left is missing much of the front and hind regions.

=== New species and genus ===
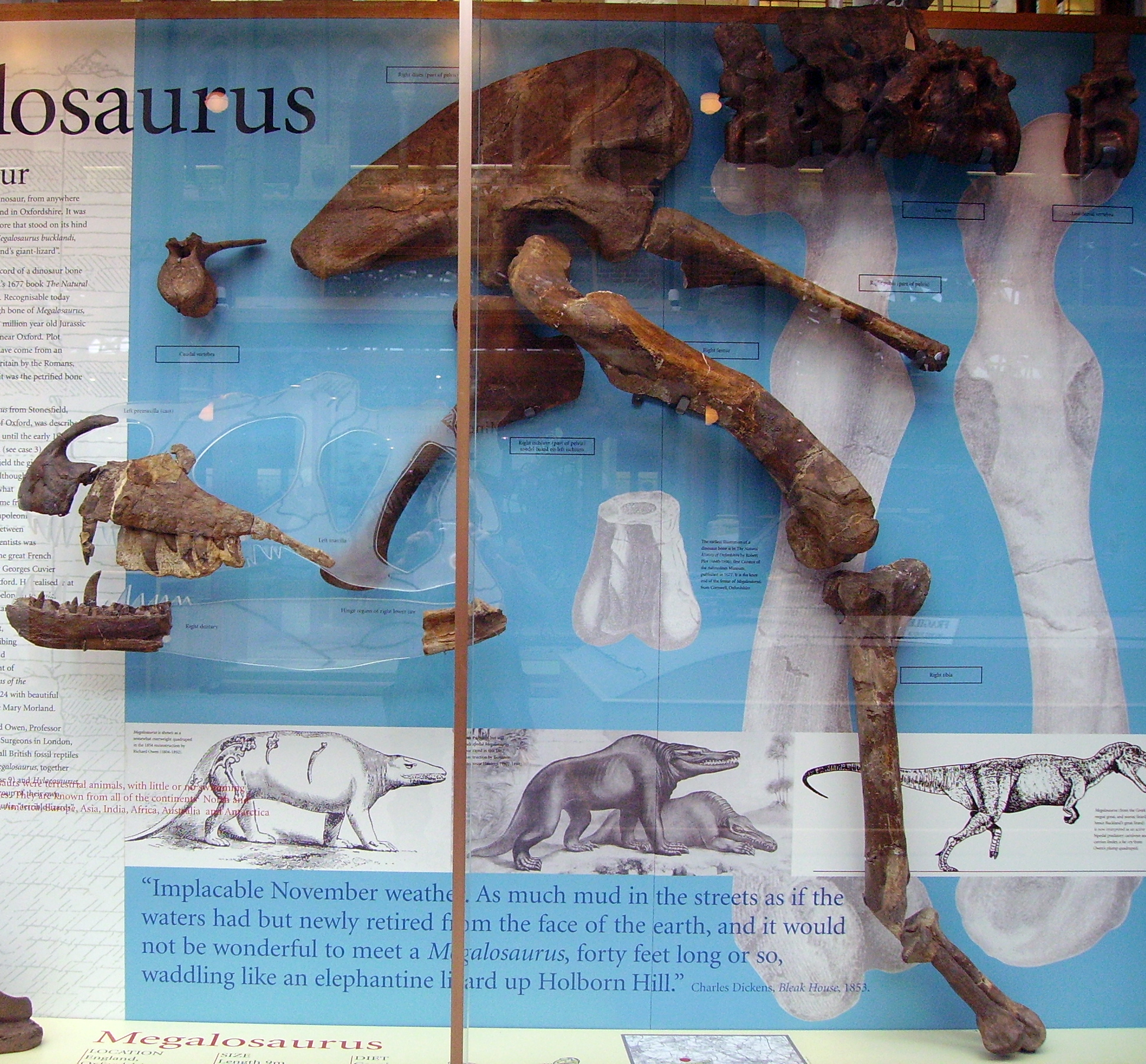
Lectotype lower jaw of M. bucklandii and various specimens historically assigned to that species, Oxford University Museum of Natural History

The German palaeontologist Friedrich von Huene used the specimen as basis for his skull reconstruction of Megalosaurus bucklandii (guided by the skull of Allosaurus) in 1926, while noting that many of the forms assigned to the genus Megalosaurus probably did not belong there. In 1964, the British palaeontologist Alick D. Walker stated that while the specimen was commonly accepted as belonging to Megalosaurus bucklandii, it had more teeth in the maxilla, was older, and at least distinct at the species level. The British palaeontologist Michael Waldman further prepared the specimen in 1964–1965 and made it the holotype (on which the scientific name is based) of a new species of Megalosaurus, M. hesperis in 1974. The distinction was based on its higher tooth count in both the upper and lower jaws, but he cautioned no further comparisons could be made due to lack of material. The specific name is derived from the Greek hesperos (Ἑσπερίς), meaning "the West" or "western". He found its dentary similar to that of Zanclodon cambrensis, but noted taxonomic issues with that species, and refrained from classifying it further.

In the 1970s, the American palaeontologists Samuel P. Welles and Jaime Emilio Powell prepared a study on European theropods, planning to move the species to the new genus "Walkersaurus". The name remained unpublished while the American amateur palaeontologist Stephan Pickering sent copies of a revised version of the manuscript to some colleagues in the 1990s, but this does not conform to the requirements of the International Code of Zoological Nomenclature, and the name is therefore considered a nomen nudum, and therefore invalid.

The British palaeontologist David B. Norman noted in 1985 that the genus Megalosaurus had historically been used as a "dustbin" for any fragmentary remains of large theropods from around the world, which probably did not belong in the genus. In 1988, the American palaeontologist Gregory S. Paul listed the species M. hesperis under fragmentary "theropod odds and ends" as Megalosaurus? hesperis (the question mark indicating incertae sedis, uncertain placement), stating the material was not sufficient to tell if it really belonged to Megalosaurus. The Australian palaeontologist Ralph E. Molnar and colleagues stated in 1990 that M. hesperis could plausibly be retained in Megalosaurus, as it resembled M. bucklandii in several characters. The American palaeontologist Thomas R. Holtz Jr. found various positions for the species possible in a 2000 phylogenetic analysis, referring to it as "Megalosaurus" hesperis. Holtz and colleagues cautioned in 2004 that while plausible, there was no diagnostic, derived feature that could support the assignment of the species to Megalosaurus, and listed it as an unnamed tetanuran (a diverse group of theropod dinosaurs that includes modern birds). In 2007, the British palaeontologists Darren Naish and David M. Martill stated that while a valid species, 'M.' hesperis was probably not assignable to Megalosaurus, and did not preserve enough information to reliably classify it within Tetanurae.

In 2008, the British palaeontologist Roger B. J. Benson and colleagues concluded that only the lectotype dentary of Megalosaurus bucklandii could be reliably attributed to the species, thereby stripping the name from all other species and specimens that had previously been assigned to Megalosaurus, as part of an effort to disentangle the historical confusion surrounding the genus. Benson later examined British fossils that had earlier assigned to M. bucklandii and found that some of them belonged to the species after all. Also in 2008, Benson redescribed the 'M.' hesperis holotype (aided by casts of the block made prior to preparation) and identified several features distinguishing it from Megalosaurus and other related theropods, and moved it to its own genus, Duriavenator, creating the new combination D. hesperis. The generic name is a combination of the Latin words Duria, "Dorset", and venator, "hunter", in full "Dorset hunter" or "hunter of Dorset".

== Description ==
Size compared to a human

Duriavenator is estimated to have been 5–7 m (16–23 ft) long and weighed 1 t (2,200 lb), and has been described as a medium-sized theropod, comparable to Megalosaurus in size (size estimates of incompletely known dinosaurs are extrapolated from better known relatives). As a megalosaurid, it would have been massively built, with a large, low head, a short and stout lower arm, and a broad and shallow pelvis.

=== Upper jaw ===
The front surface of the holotype premaxilla is inclined hindward and upwards at an angle of about 50 degrees relative to the lower margin, an angle comparable to the megalosaurid Torvosaurus, but lower than in Dubreuillosaurus and Eustreptospondylus. Though the outer side surface of the premaxilla is poorly preserved, randomly distributed nutrient foramina (openings for blood-vessels) are visible towards its front. The bone surface at the middle front of the premaxilla is flat and marked by hind and upwards oriented striations where it would have connected with the other premaxilla. A foramen (opening) is present at the front middle surface, right below the front end of the bony nostril. Three prominent processes (outgrowths) extend backwards from the upper part of the premaxilla. The lowest of these is the palatal process, which was prominent in Duriavenator compared to other basal (early diverging) tetanurans, and the two processes above together form a subnarial (below the nostril) process. A foramen opens hind-wards between the palatal and subnarial processes, with another foramen opening just behind it. One of these foramina probably opened into a canal for the nerve or blood vessel that also continued into the foramen on the surface of the maxilla that connected with the premaxilla, a feature also seen in Megalosaurus.

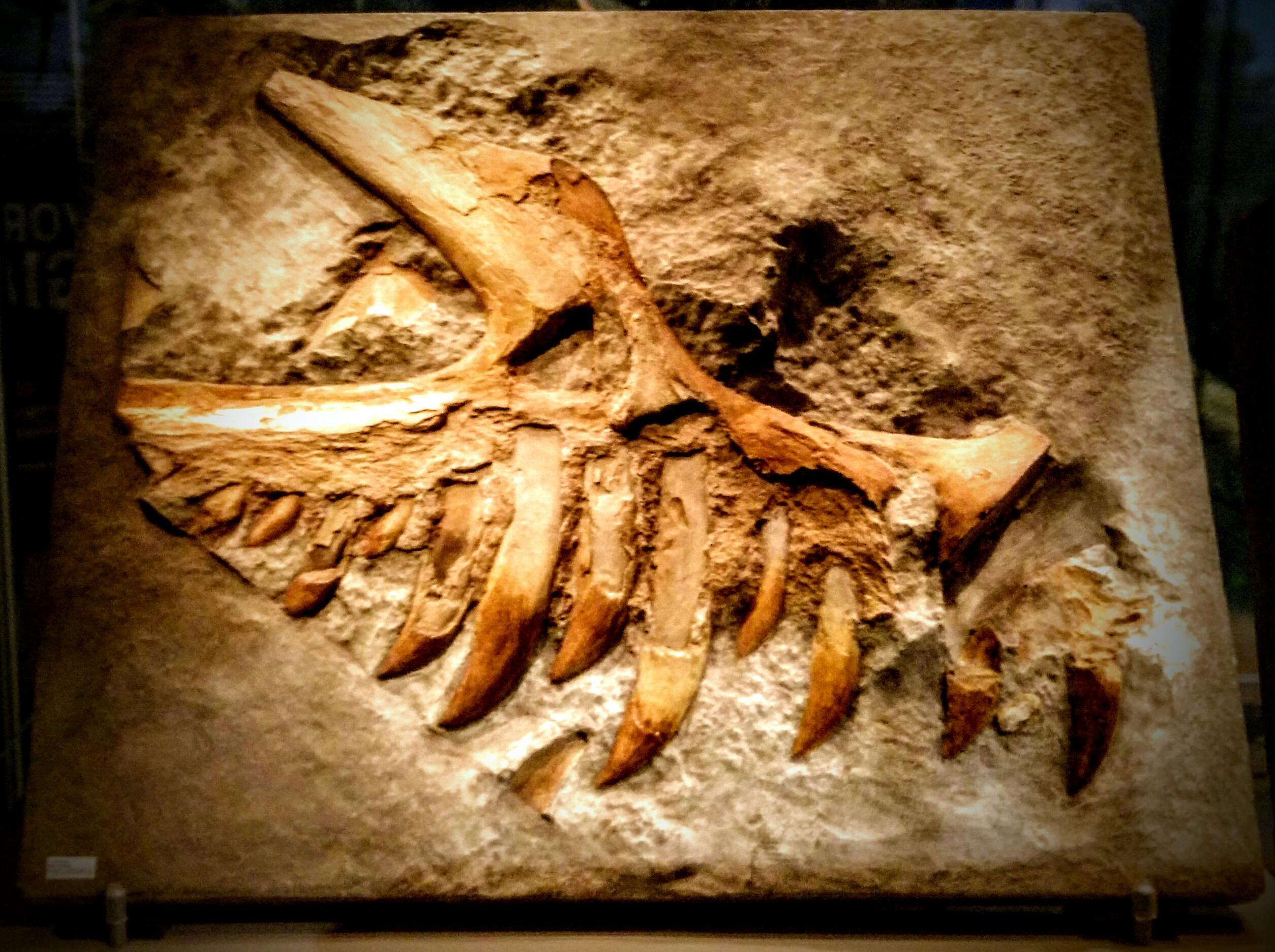
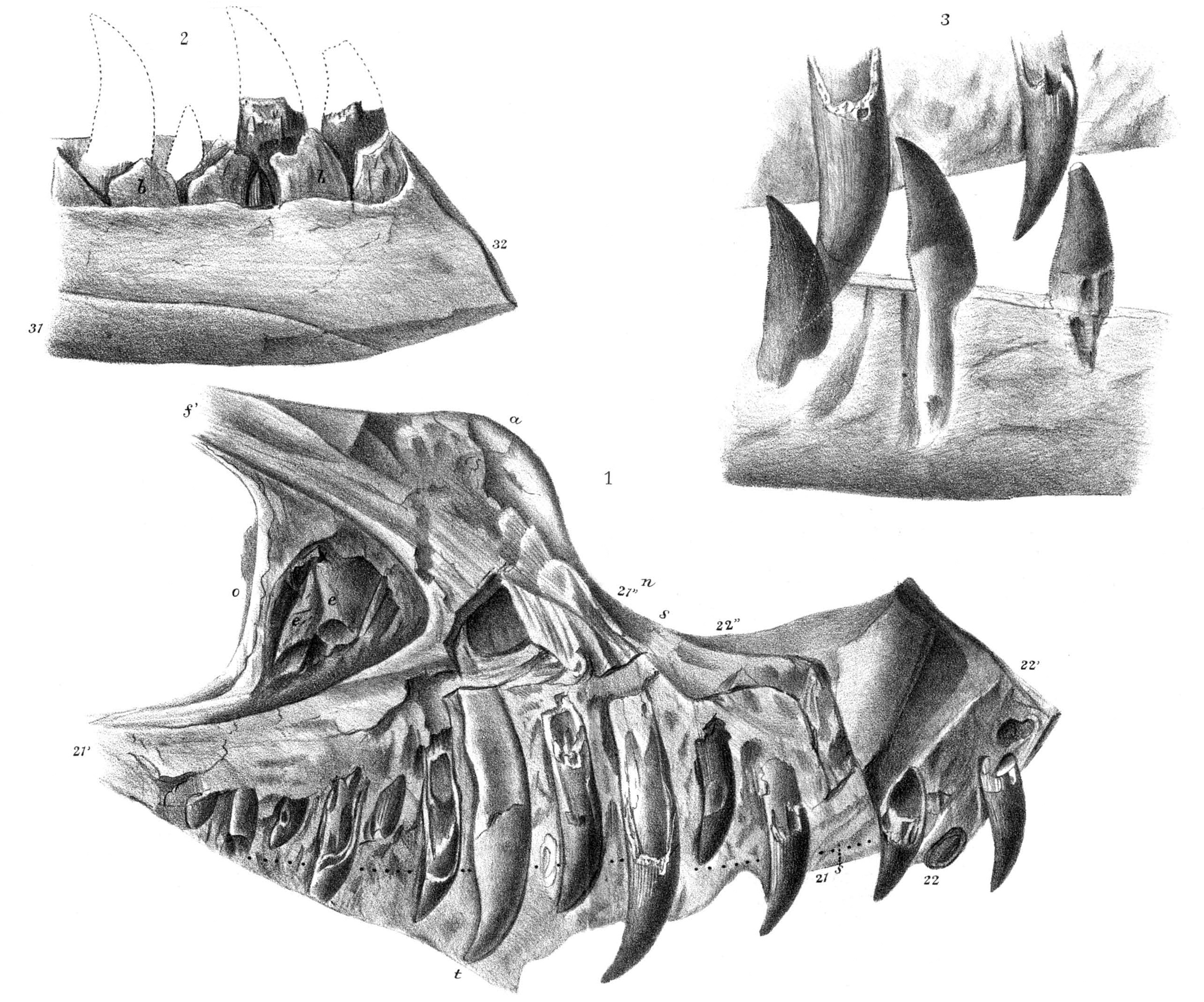
Cast of the holotype upper jaw prior to preparation, Yorkshire Museum (above), and 1883 lithograph (below)

The holotype specimen only preserves two tooth sockets in the left premaxilla (the right premaxilla does not preserve any), while four premaxillary teeth were reported prior to the preparation of the specimen; two preserving the tooth crowns, one preserved as a cross-section of its original position, and one as an imprint of a juvenile tooth. Today, this number of teeth cannot be observed directly in either the specimen or casts of it made prior to preparation. Waldman suggested there were five tooth sockets in the premaxilla, and if this is true, Duriavenator would have been unique among megalosauroids, which have either lower or higher numbers of premaxillary teeth. The surface of the maxilla that connects with the premaxilla is slightly concave, and there are eleven foramina about 2 mm (0.08 in) in diameter each as well as smaller foramina present on the lower part of this surface. Such foramina are absent in most basal tetanurans, but are present in Carcharodontosaurus where they extend further upwards than in Duriavenator, and the condition in Duriavenator is considered an autapomorphy, a distinguishing feature.

The frontwards directed anterior process of the maxilla is about as long as it is high, which is long compared to some theropods, like non-tetanurans, carcharodontosaurines and sinraptorids, which either lack such a process or have one that is short. A tab-like flange projects frontwards from the side margin of the anterior process, which must have overlapped the side surface of the premaxilla, which is similar to structures seen in Torvosaurus but absent in Dubreuillosaurus. Because part of the side surface of the maxilla adheres to the counterpart slab, details such as texture and foramina cannot be observed properly there. Two pneumatic (air-filled) chambers can be seen through a break in the maxilla in a corner of the antorbital fossa (a depression in front of the antorbital fenestra). The frontmost of these chambers is the maxillary fenestra (though it forms a fossa rather than a true fenestra), and the hindmost chamber is the frontwards extension of a pneumatic excavation on the upper surface of the jugal process (a process that connects with the jugal bone), which forms a deep, longitudinal groove with many foramina. While such pneumatic excavations are present in other tetanurans, in those they form two almost oval excavations that do not extend far hind-wards, and the condition seen in Duriavenator is therefore a distinguishing feature. The inwards surface of the maxilla is smooth, and an anteromedial process extends from this surface. The preserved part of the vomer has a similar morphology to that of Allosaurus.

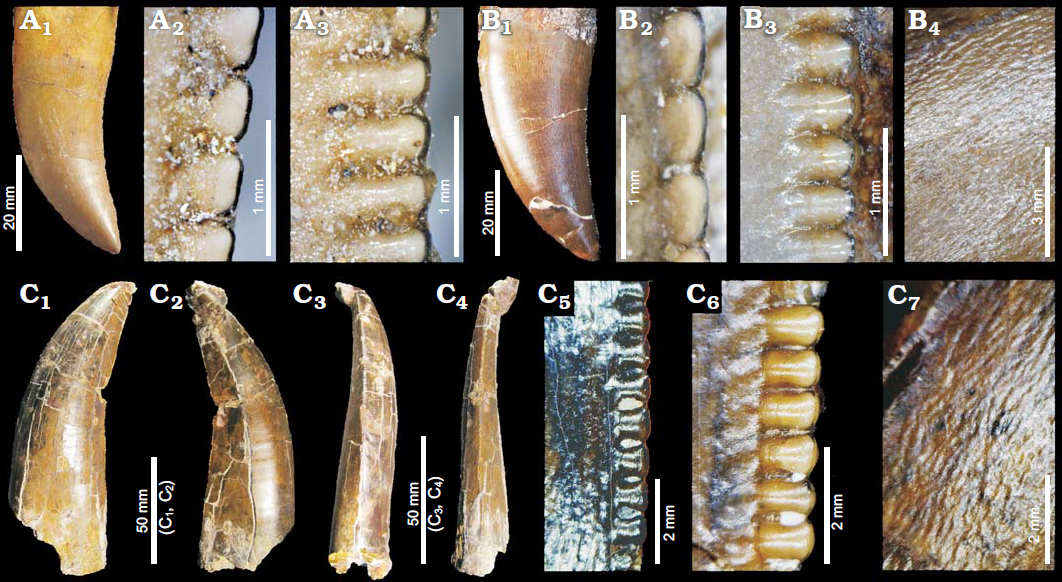
Sixth right maxillary tooth of Duriavenator (A 1–3) compared to teeth of other European megalosaurines

All 11 tooth sockets of the maxilla contain emerging or fully-erupted teeth; based on comparison with the similar maxilla of Dubreuillosaurus, 14–16 teeth may have been present in the complete bone, whereas comparison based on Megalosaurus would indicate fewer than 14 teeth. On the inwards side of the maxilla, replacement teeth at varying development stages can be seen between the interdental plates (bony plates between the teeth). The teeth are curved and serrated, like most theropod teeth, with short sulci (grooves) between the serrations. There are 8–9 serrations per 5 mm (0.2 in) on the front and hind edges at the mid-height of the frontmost tooth crowns, and 8–13 on the crowns further back. The teeth have weak, band-like enamel wrinkles, extending between the front and hind cutting edges of the teeth, along their outer and inner surfaces. The hind cutting edge continues to the base of the tooth crown and the front cutting edge extends about halfway to the crown's base. The interdental plates are roughly pentagonal and unfused, and extend to the bottom level of the side wall of the maxilla. The tallest plate is between the second and third tooth sockets, and the plates decrease in height in front of and behind this. The inwards surfaces of the plates are lightly pitted and have weak striations.

=== Lower jaw ===
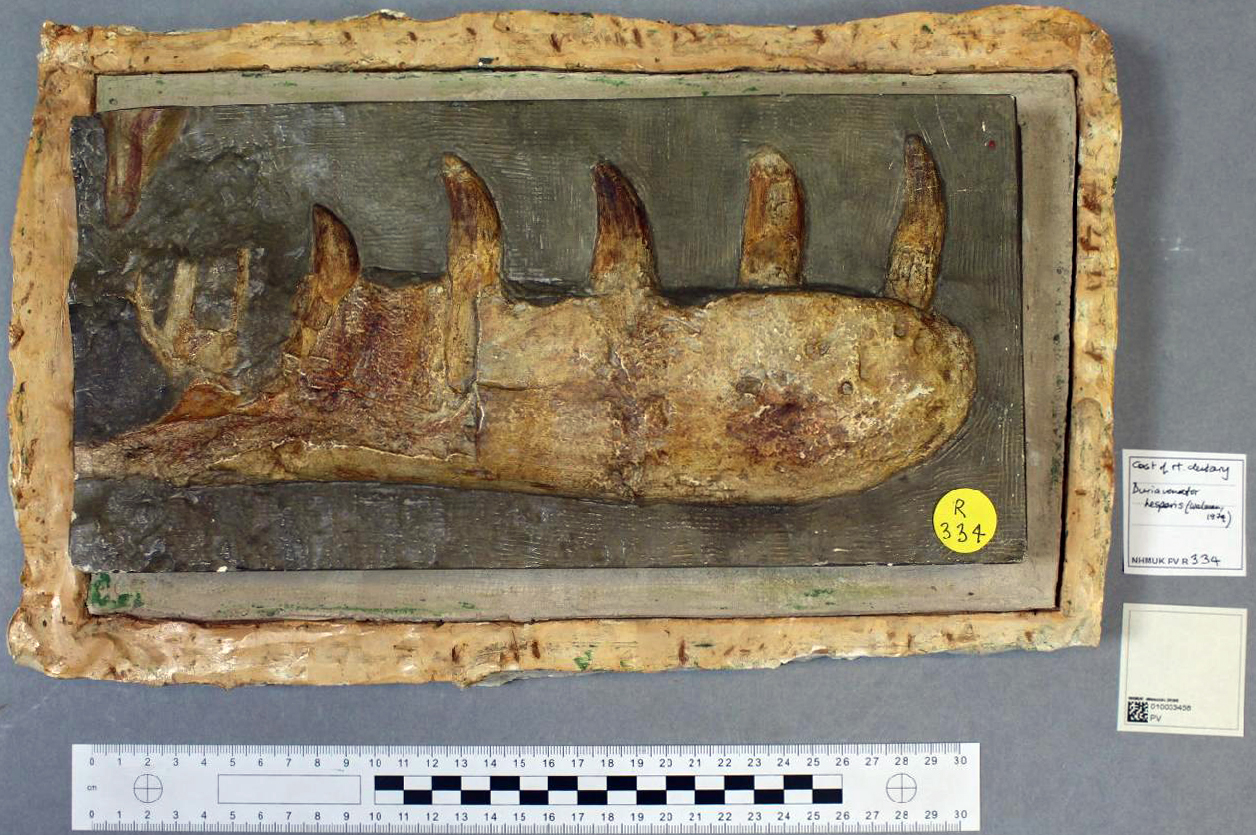
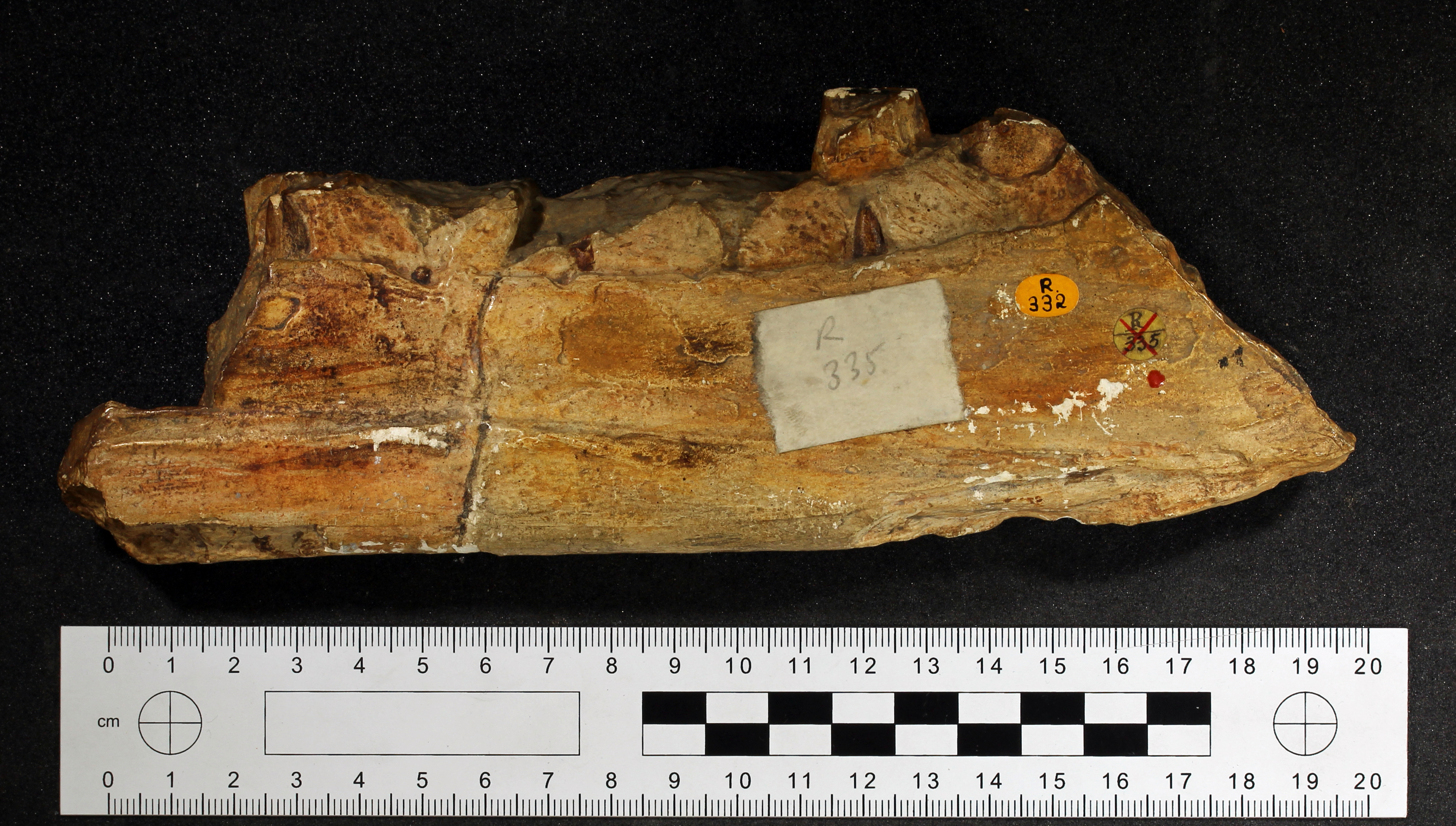
Casts of the right (top) and left (bottom) holotype dentaries of the lower jaw, Natural History Museum, London

The dentary of the lower jaw has tall, roughly pentagonal interdental plates on the inwards side of the tooth row, and the inwards sides of these plates have a weakly pitted texture. The plates are separated from the inner wall of the dentary by a paradental groove, which is wide at the front, but narrow hind-wards by the fourth tooth socket, where the inner wall of the dentary contacts the interdental plates. The symphyseal region at the front of the dentary (where the two halves of the lower jaw connected) appears to have been much less distinct than that of Allosaurus. There are three front and upwards curving ridges on the dentary, oriented parallel to the lower surface at the front of the dentary, similar to Magnosaurus and other megalosauroids.

The Meckelian groove which runs along the inner surface of the dentary is inclined towards the back and downwards, and is wide and shallow. The lower margin of this groove is better defined than its upper margin, particularly in front of the Meckelian fossa, where it forms a sharp, convex lip. There are two Meckelian foramina in succession close to the front end of the groove, both with roughly oval outlines. The outer surface of the dentary is smooth, with about 14 neurovascular foramina randomly arranged at the front. Further back, there is a longitudinal row of slit-like foramina in a groove just above mid-height, positioned towards the bottom so they are not visible in side view.

The right dentary only preserves parts of the first 13 tooth sockets; comparison with Allosaurus indicates there would only have been one or two more tooth sockets, totalling 14 or 15, which is comparable to the estimate of tooth socket number in the maxilla. Emerging teeth are present in five tooth sockets, and replacement teeth are visible between the interdental plates next to four sockets. The first three tooth sockets are roughly circular, and the third is the largest of them all. The sockets behind the third are roughly rectangular, and decrease in size hind-wards. By the third tooth socket, the dentary expands to the sides to accommodate the enlarged socket, as seen in Magnosaurus and megalosaurids other than Megalosaurus. The second tooth of the right dentary is the only well-preserved adult tooth from the front of a dentary known from any megalosauroid, except for the family Spinosauridae. It is longer than the teeth further behind and is circular in cross-section, consistent with the outline of its socket, and it is inclined forwards and up. Its front cutting edge extends only a short distance from the tip towards the base, while it extends just over a third of the crown height towards the base in the teeth further behind. Coelophysoids have similar front dentary teeth, and they may also be cylindrical and be inclined towards the front and upwards in other theropods with enlarged, roughly circular tooth sockets such as other megalosauroids and some allosauroids.

== Classification ==
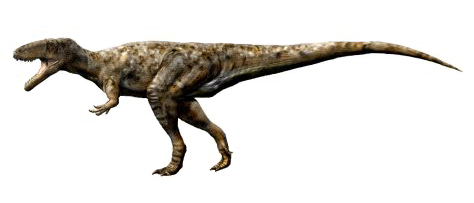
Life restoration with body based on related species

Until it was re-described and moved to its own genus Duriavenator in 2008, the higher level classification of the species was unclear, due to the fragmentary nature of its fossils and lack of detailed study. Researchers were unable to classify it more specifically within Tetanurae, a diverse group of theropods which dominated the predator niche from the Middle Jurassic and until the end of the Cretaceous, and also includes modern birds. Benson stated in 2008 that it was important to confirm the tetanuran status of early members of the group, such as Duriavenator, by detailed description and comparisons, so they could be included in phylogenetic analyses and the evolutionary origins of the group be examined. Being Bajocian in age (a stage in the Middle Jurassic), Duriavenator and Magnosaurus are some of the oldest known tetanurans, with supposed older members of the group having been misidentified.

In addition to being distinct from Megalosaurus (including in features like an enlarged, roughly circular third dentary tooth socket and front dentary teeth that are inclined forwards), Benson identified tetanuran features in Duriavenator (including a prominent front process of the maxilla and band-like enamel wrinkles on the teeth), and noted he would subsequently examine whether the family Megalosauridae, which it and many other British theropods had been previously grouped in, was a monophyletic (natural) group. He also pointed out differences from Magnosaurus from the same time and place, and considered them distinct from each other.

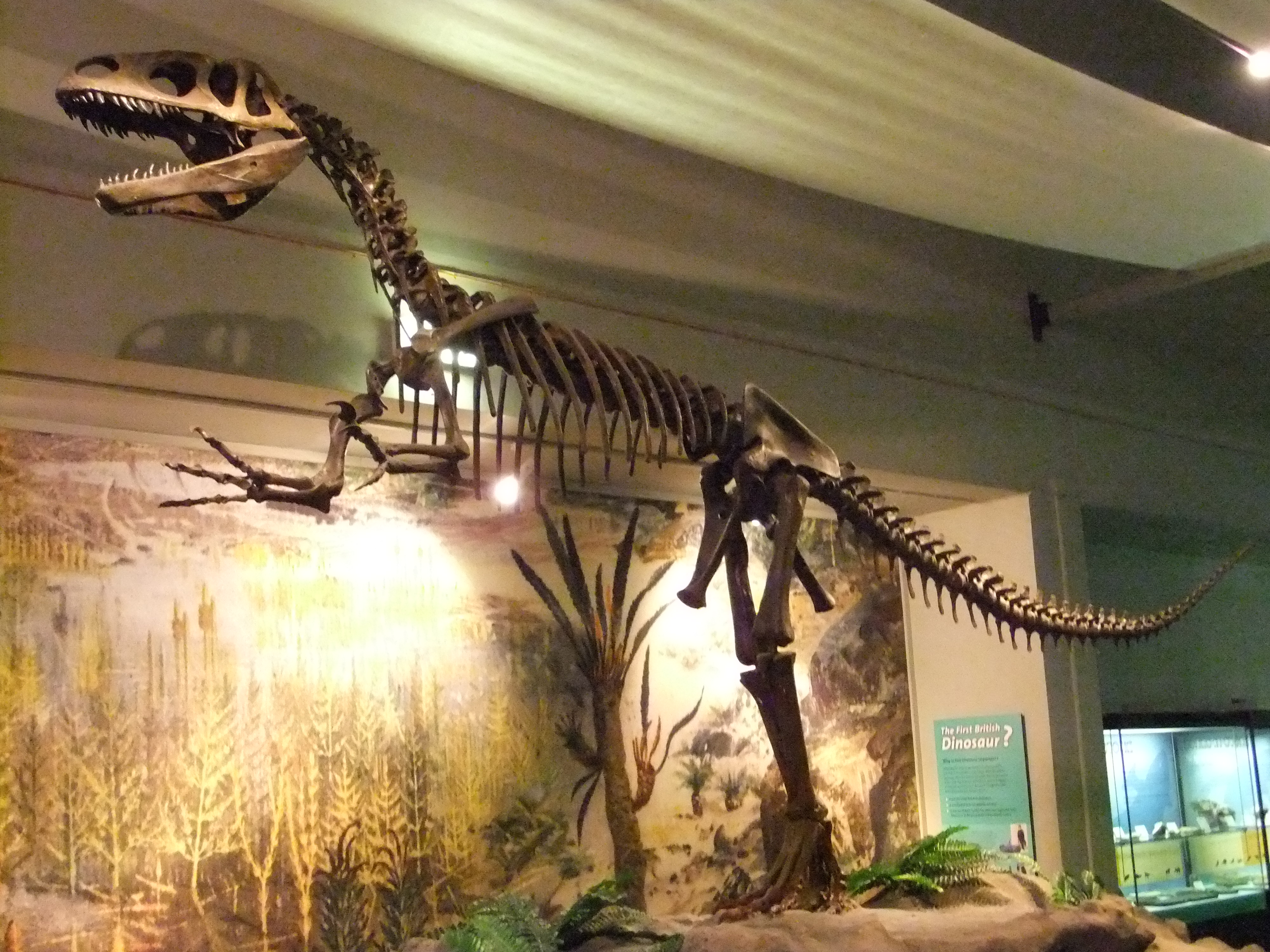
Reconstructed skeleton of the related Megalosaurus, World Museum Liverpool

In 2010, after re-evaluating various fossils historically assigned to Megalosaurus, Benson performed a phylogenetic analysis, the first to focus on basal tetanurans. He confirmed that Megalosauroidea (which had also been called Spinosauroidea previously) included the two families Megalosauridae and Spinosauridae, and that Megalosauridae was a natural group. This was also the first time Duriavenator was included in such an analysis, and it was found to group within Megalosauridae in a basal position. Benson found that almost all large-bodied theropods from the Middle Jurassic were megalosauroids, with geographic differentiation among clades showing endemic theropod groups developed across the supercontinent Pangaea, while megalosaurids were not known outside Europe during this period. Megalosauroids became less diverse and abundant during the Late Jurassic, when the large-bodied theropod niche was dominated by neotetanurans, indicating faunal turnover between the Middle and Late Jurassic. Megalosauroids survived until the Late Cretaceous, when the long-snouted spinosaurids were relatively diverse.

In 2012, the American palaeontologist Matthew T. Carrano, Benson and Scott D. Sampson examined the phylogeny of Tetanura, and found Duriavenator to group in the subfamily Megalosaurinae along with Megalosaurus and Torvosaurus. They suggested that the existence of the tetanurans Duriavenator and Magnosaurus by the early Middle Jurassic indicates that basal megalosauroids and avetheropods had evolutionarily radiated during the late Early Jurassic at the latest, and that these lineages extended much farther back in time than what is indicated by the relatively poor fossil record of this period. The following cladogram shows the position of Duriavenator within Megalosauroidea according to Carrano and colleagues, 2012:

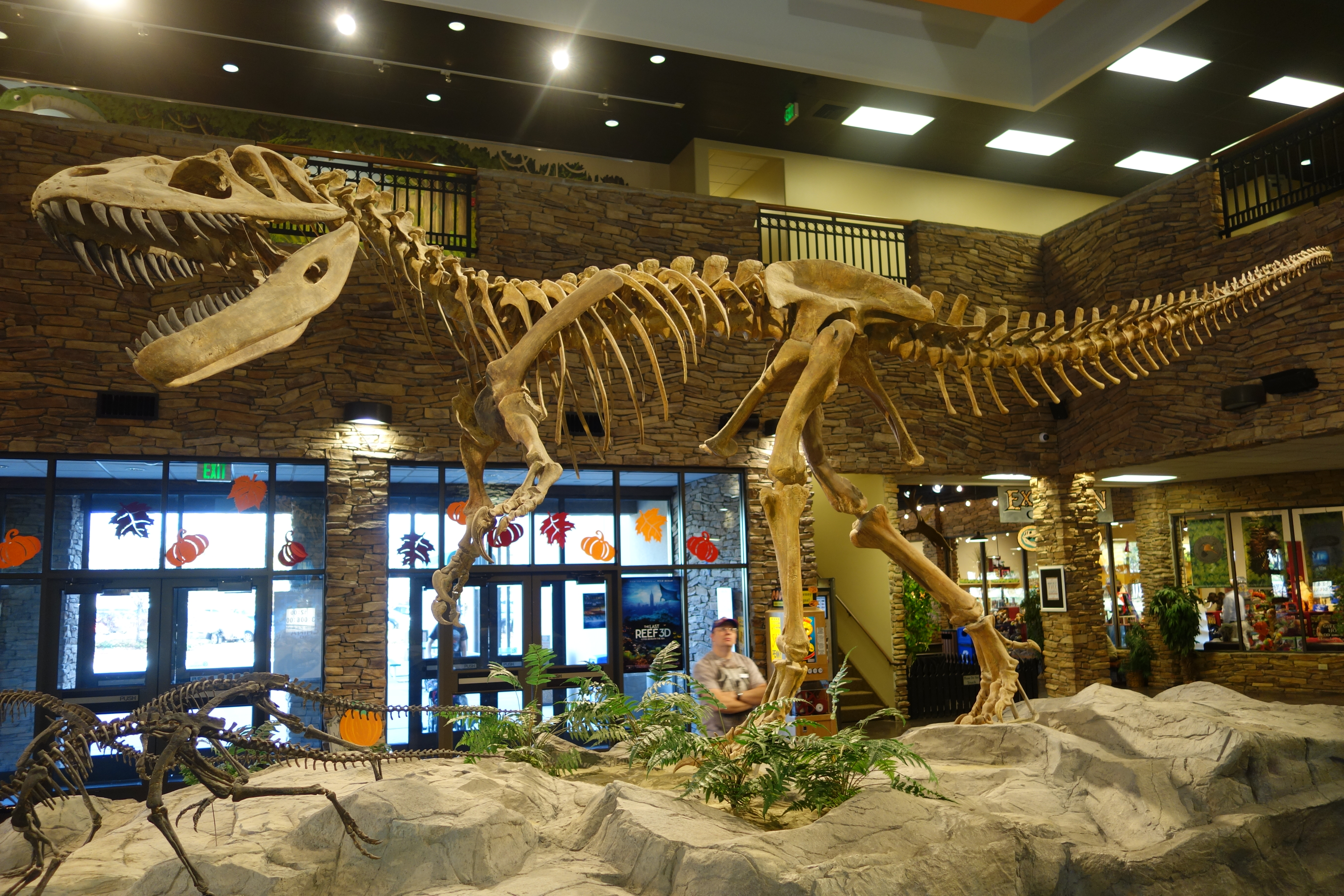
Reconstructed skeleton of Torvosaurus, a more completely known megalosaurid, Museum of Ancient Life

- Megalosauroidea
  - Piatnitzkysauridae
  - Megalosauria
    - Streptospondylus
    - Eustreptospondylus
    - Megalosauridae
      - Megalosaurinae
        - Duriavenator
        - - Megalosaurus
          - Torvosaurus
      - Leshansaurus
      - Afrovenatorinae
        - Afrovenator
        - Magnosaurus
        - Piveteausaurus
        - Dubreuillosaurus
        - Poekilopleuron
    - Spinosauridae

In their 2016 description of the megalosaurid Wiehenvenator, the German palaeontologist Oliver W. M. Rauhut and colleagues included a cladogram which they found to be in perfect accordance with the stratigraphic appearance of the taxa included. It showed Duriavenator as the most basal member of Megalosaurinae, which was in accordance with its older, Bajocian age, followed by Megalosaurus from the Bathonian, Wiehenvenator from the Callovian, and finally Torvosaurus from the Kimmeridgian-Tithonian.

== Palaeobiology ==
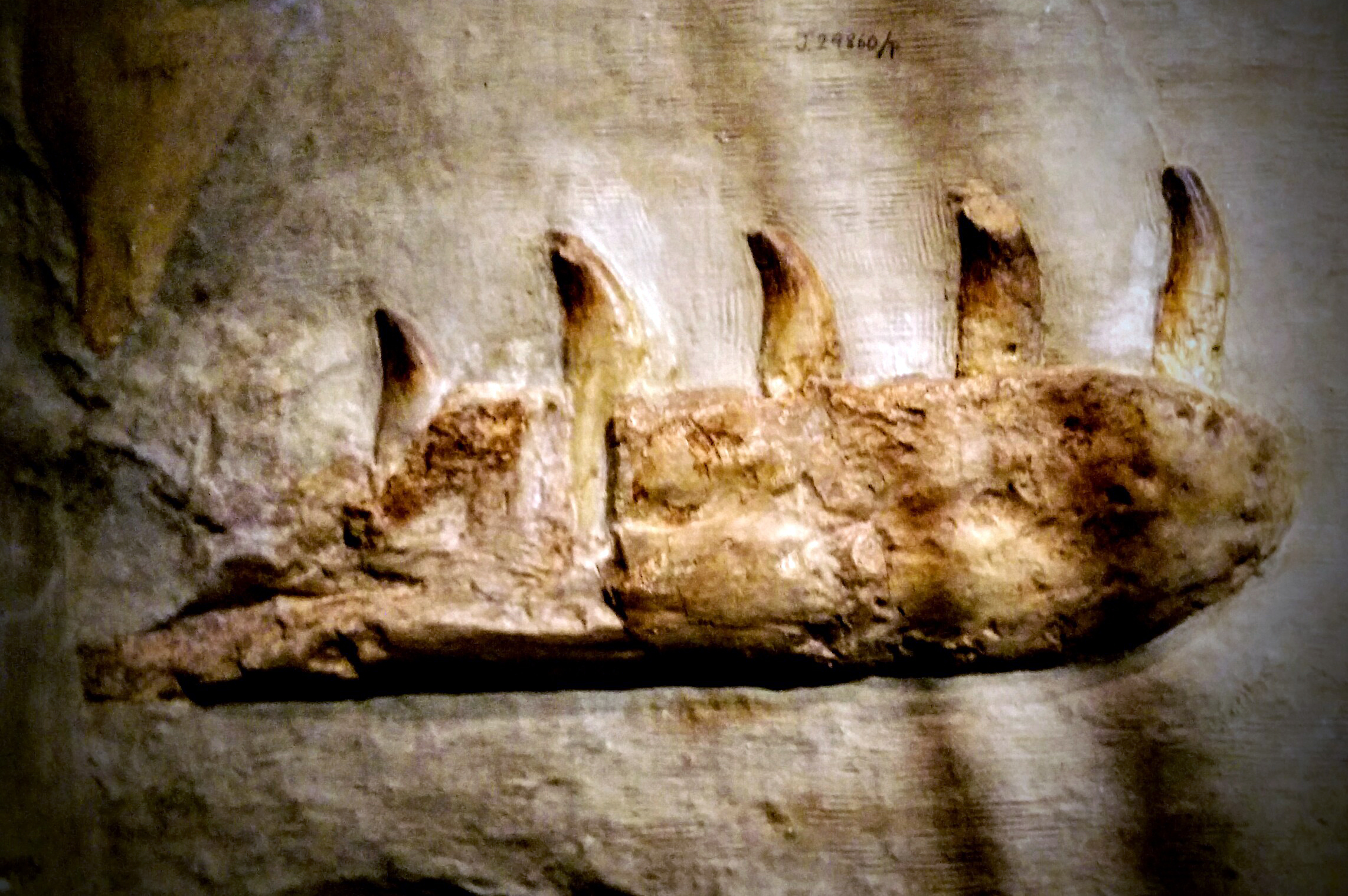
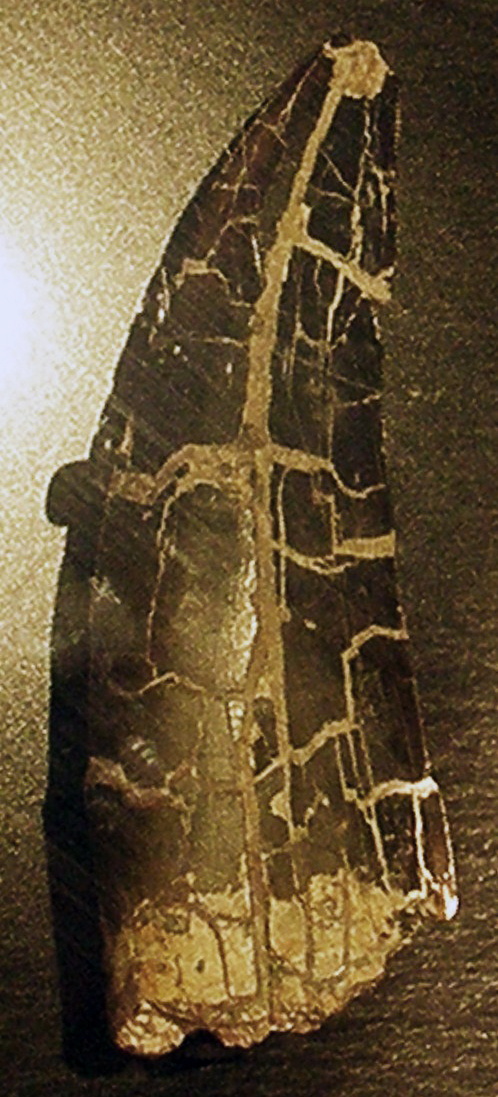
Cast of the holotype dentary, showing the long teeth at the front, YM (left) and an isolated tooth, NHM (right)

Benson and Barrett pointed out in 2009 that the teeth at the front of the dentary in Duriavenator were longer than those at the back, were circular in cross-section, and were slightly inclined forwards, and that such heterodonty (difference in tooth morphology) seen in megalosauroids and some other theropods may be associated with plucking or precise grasping during feeding. Large, carnivorous theropods (such as tyrannosaurids) often have relatively uniform, homodont teeth instead.

Holtz stated in 2012 that lighter megalosaurids, with their long, shallow snouts and relatively weak bites, would have relied on their stout, well-muscled arms to catch and kill their prey. Paul suggested in 2016 that megalosaurids were ambush predators, whose prey included sauropods and stegosaurs. The American palaeontologists Bruce M. Rothschild and Virginia Naples suggested in 2017 that the lateral grooves on the dentary of Duriavenator were similar to those of albertosaurine tyrannosaurids, interpreting these grooves as sensory organs analogous to the lateral lines of fish, which might have helped in determining the direction of the wind and the origin of a detected scent.

== Palaeoenvironment ==
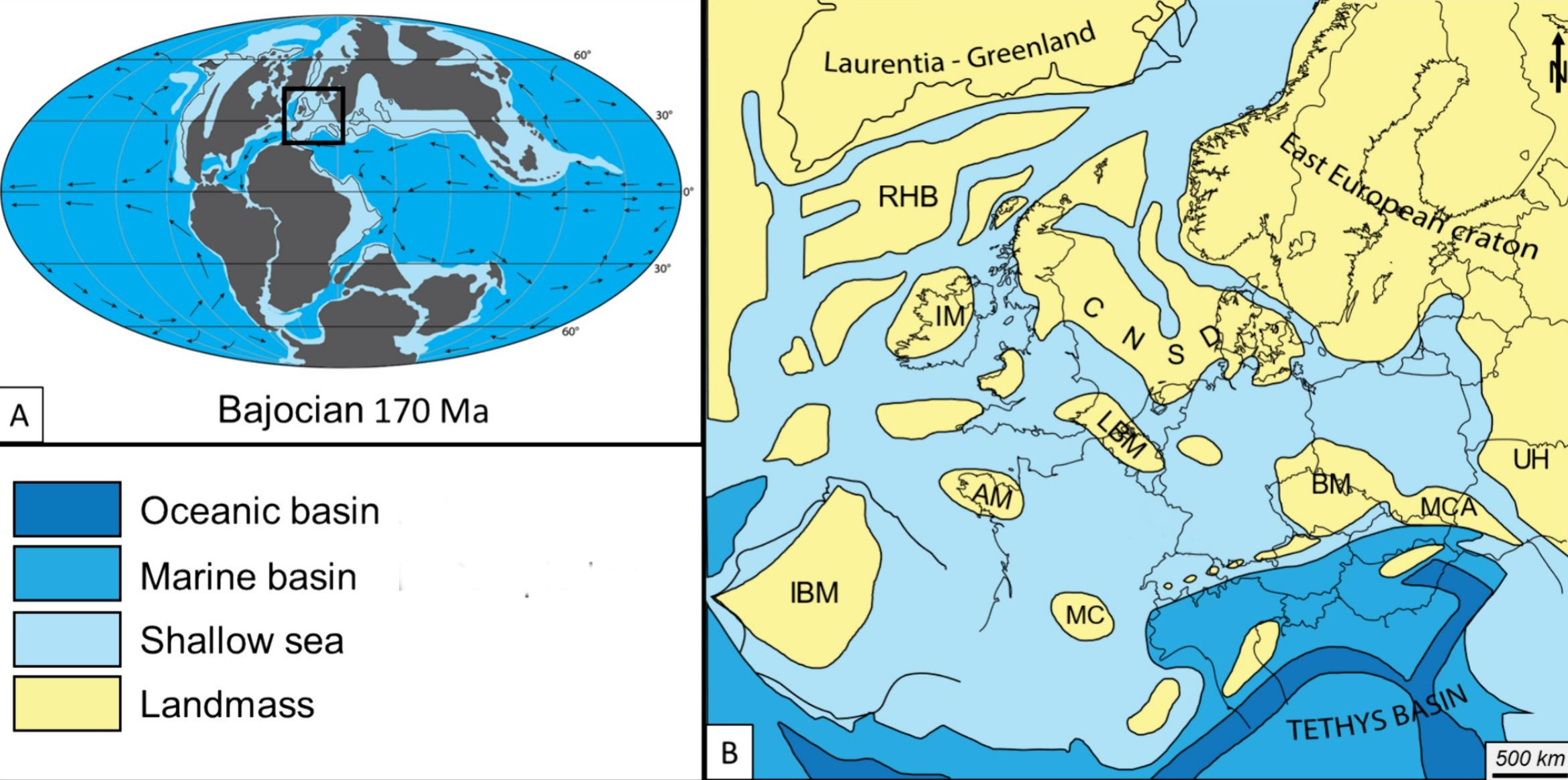
Geography of Europe during the Bajocian stage when Duriavenator lived

The only known Duriavenator specimen was collected from the Upper Inferior Oolite geological formation, in the Garantiana garantiana subzone of the Parkinsonia parkinsoni ammonite zone (index fossil zones used for stratigraphic dating), which dates to the late Bajocian, about 168 million years ago. This unit is composed of limestone and marl, and contains fossils of marine invertebrates.

During the Middle Jurassic, Britain was located in the subtropics, and along with the rest of Western Europe formed a part of an island archipelago, in a seaway narrowly separated from Laurentia (landmass consisting of North America and Greenland) to the west and the Fennoscandian Shield to the northeast. Britain was divided into a number of islands separated by shallow seas, including one formed by the London–Brabant Massif to the east, the Welsh Massif to the west, the Cornubian Massif to the southwest, and the Pennine-Scottish Massif to the north.

Other dinosaurs from the Inferior Oolite Formation of England include the megalosaurid Magnosaurus, indeterminate megalosaurids, indeterminate sauropods, an indeterminate stegosaurid, and ornithopod tracks are also known. Other dinosaurs known from the Bajocian of Britain include the sauropod Cetiosaurus.
