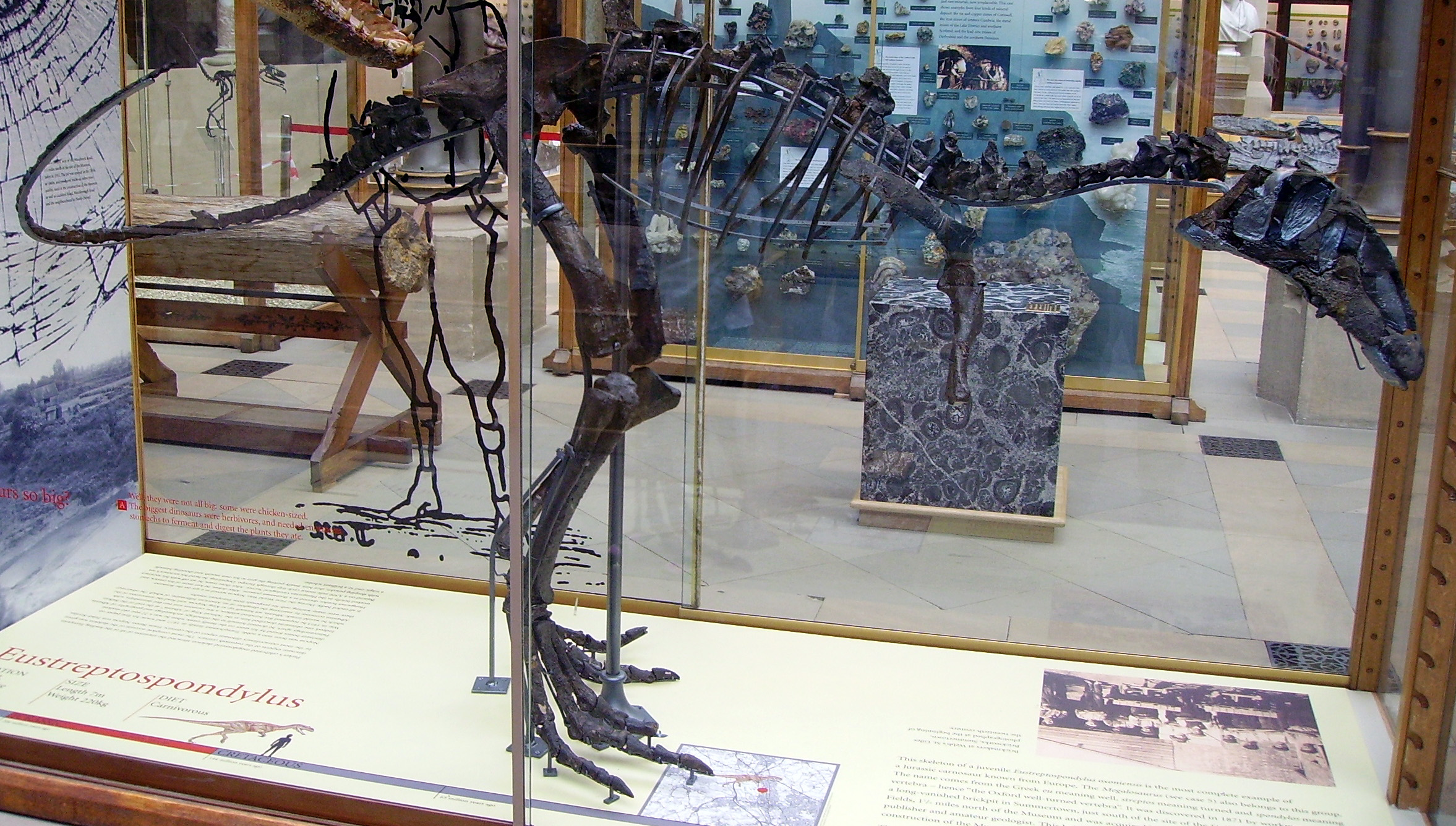
- Mounted holotype skeleton

Scientific classification
- Kingdom: Animalia
- Phylum: Chordata
- Class: Reptilia
- Clade: Dinosauria
- Clade: Saurischia
- Clade: Theropoda
- Family: †Megalosauridae
- Subfamily: †Eustreptospondylinae; Paul, 1988
- Genus: †Eustreptospondylus; Walker, 1964
- Species: †E. oxoniensis

Binomial name
- †Eustreptospondylus oxoniensis Walker, 1964

Synonyms
- Magnosaurus oxoniensis (Walker, 1964) Rauhut 2003

= Eustreptospondylus =

Eustreptospondylus Temporal range: Middle Jurassic to Late Jurassic (Callovian-Oxfordian), 166–154 Ma

Extinct genus of dinosaurs

Eustreptospondylus (/juːˌstrɛptoʊspɒnˈdaɪləs/ yoo-STREPT-o-spon-DY-ləs;), from (Ancient Greek εὖ (eû), meaning "well", στρεπτός (streptós), meaning "twisted", and σπόνδυλος (spóndulos), meaning "vertebra"), is an extinct genus of megalosaurid theropod dinosaur, from the Callovian and Oxfordian stages of the Jurassic period (some time between 166 and 154 million years ago) in southern England, at a time when Europe was a series of scattered islands (due to tectonic movement at the time which raised the sea-bed and flooded the lowland).

== Discovery and naming ==
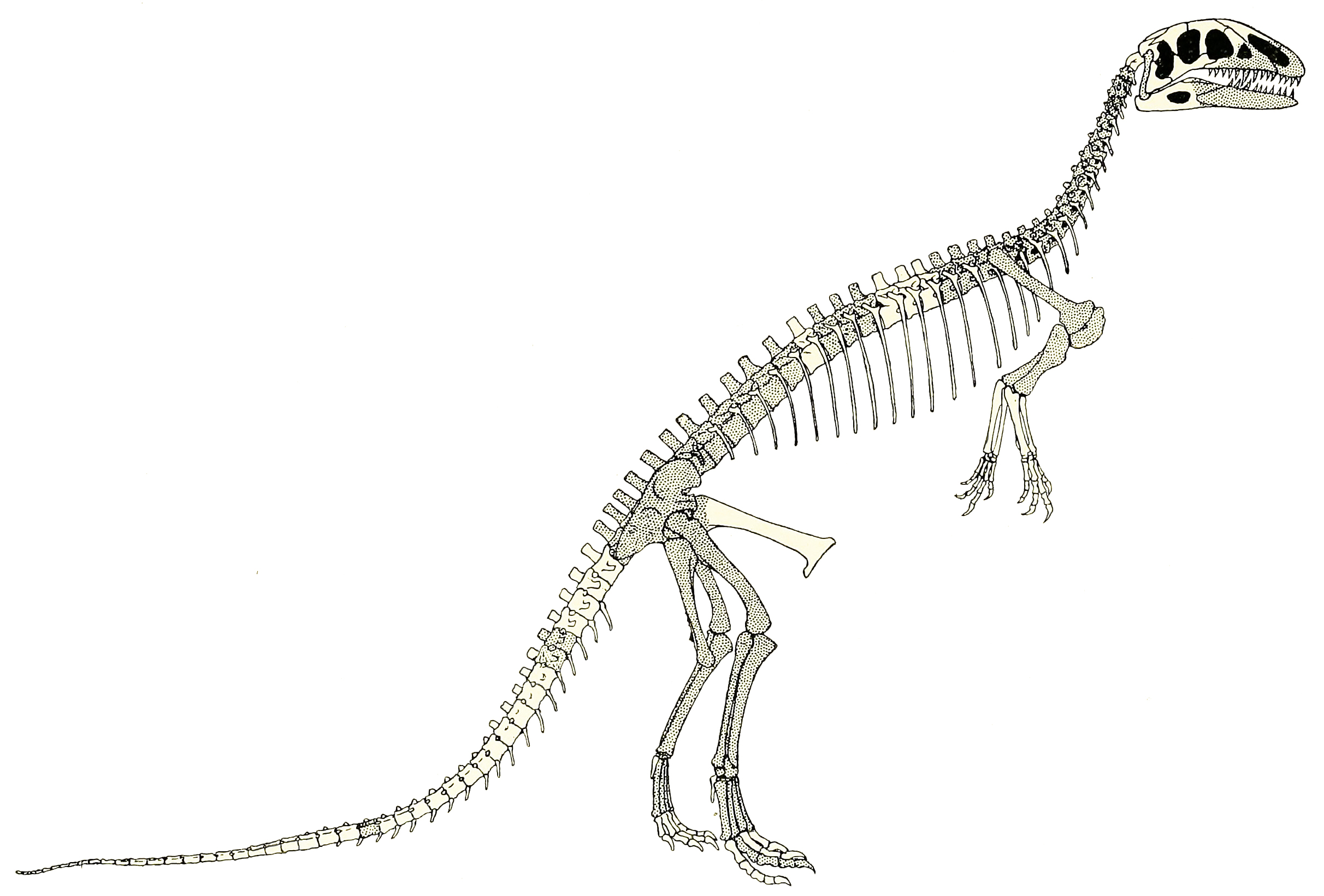
Nopcsa's 1905 skeletal restoration

In 1870, workers at the Summertown Brick Pit, just north of Oxford, England, found the skeleton of a theropod. The remains were acquired by the local bookseller James Parker, who brought them to the attention of Oxford Professor John Phillips. Phillips described the bones in 1871, but did not name them. At the time, the remains represented the most complete skeleton of a large theropod ever found. Eustreptospondylus is still the most complete of any large Jurassic European theropod. In 1890, the skeleton was bought by Oxford University, and Arthur Smith Woodward examined it and referred it to Megalosaurus bucklandii. In 1905 and 1906 Baron Franz Nopcsa reassigned the skeleton to the species, Streptospondylus cuvieri, which had been first described by Sir Richard Owen in 1842, based on a now lost vertebra from the Bathonian stage of the Jurassic period. The reason for this assignment was that the type species Streptospondylus altdorfensis from France, was a clearly related form, and Nopcsa decided to subsume all British material of this nature under a single Streptospondylus species, for which then the name S. cuvieri could not be avoided. The assignment of a rather complete find to a species based on very poor remains was troublesome. This was compounded by German palaeontologist Friedrich von Huene, who sometime referred to the specimen as Streptospondylus cuvieri and at other times considered it a species of Megalosaurus: Megalosaurus cuvieri.

In 1964, Alick Donald Walker clarified matters by erecting a separate genus and species for the Oxford specimen: Eustreptospondylus oxoniensis. The genus name Eustreptospondylus, was intended to mean "true Streptospondylus". Streptospondylus means "turned vertebra", and is derived from the Greek words streptos (στρεπτος) meaning "reversed" and spondylus (σπονδυλος), a reference to the fact that its dorsal vertebrae were opisthocoelous, in contrast to the typical procoelous vertebrae of crocodiles. The specific name "oxoniensis", refers to its provenance from Oxford.

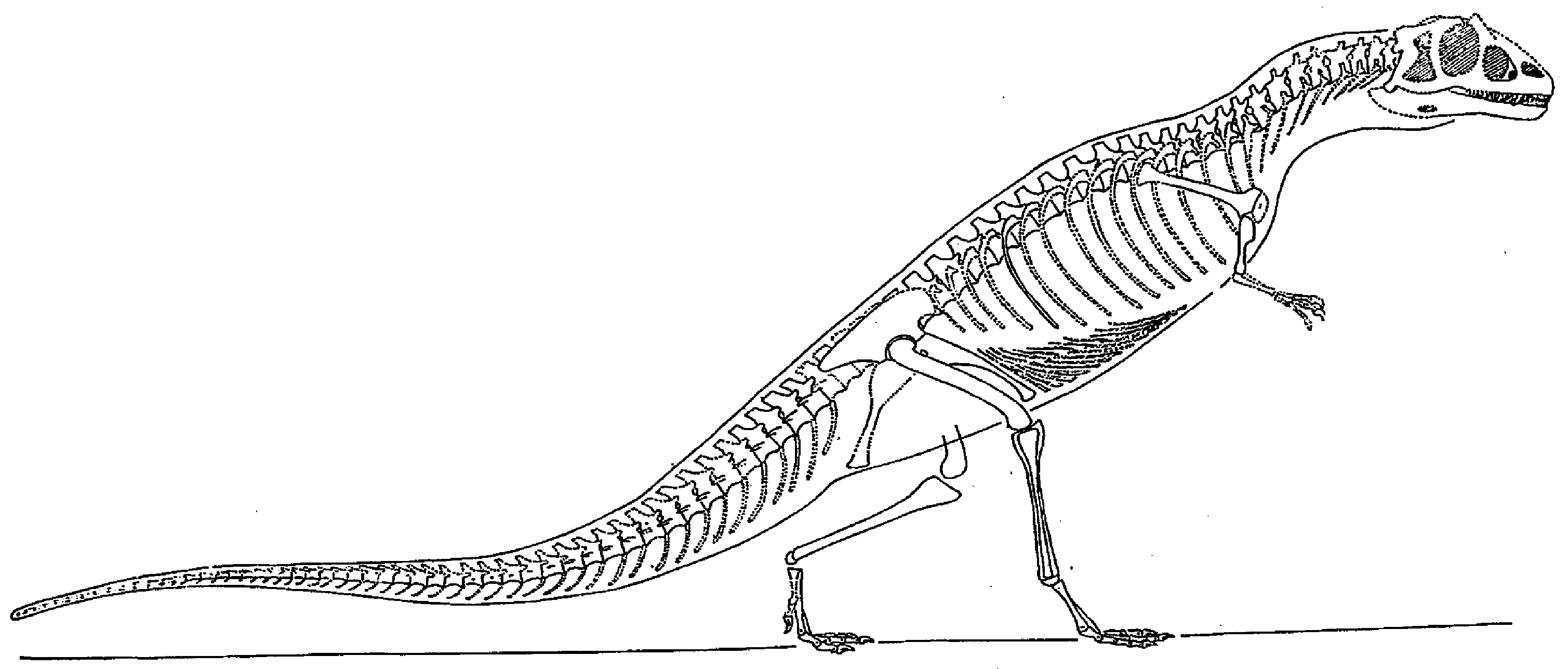
Von Huene's 1923 restoration of Streptospondylus cuvieri, which actually depicts Eustreptospondylus

The holotype, OUM J13558, was recovered by W. Parker from claystone in a marine layer of the Stewartby Member of the Oxford Clay Formation, which dates to the Callovian stage of the Jurassic period, approximately 162 million years ago. It consists of a rather complete skeleton, with a skull which is missing elements including the nasal bones, the jugals, the rear ends of the lower jaws, the lower arms and the end of the tail. It represents a subadult individual. The only other specimen ever referred to Eustreptospondylus oxoniensis is OUMNH J.29775, a left ilium. The holotype was fully prepared and exhibited in 1924, in a rather erect position. In the early twenty-first century a new display changed this to a horizontal position of the body.

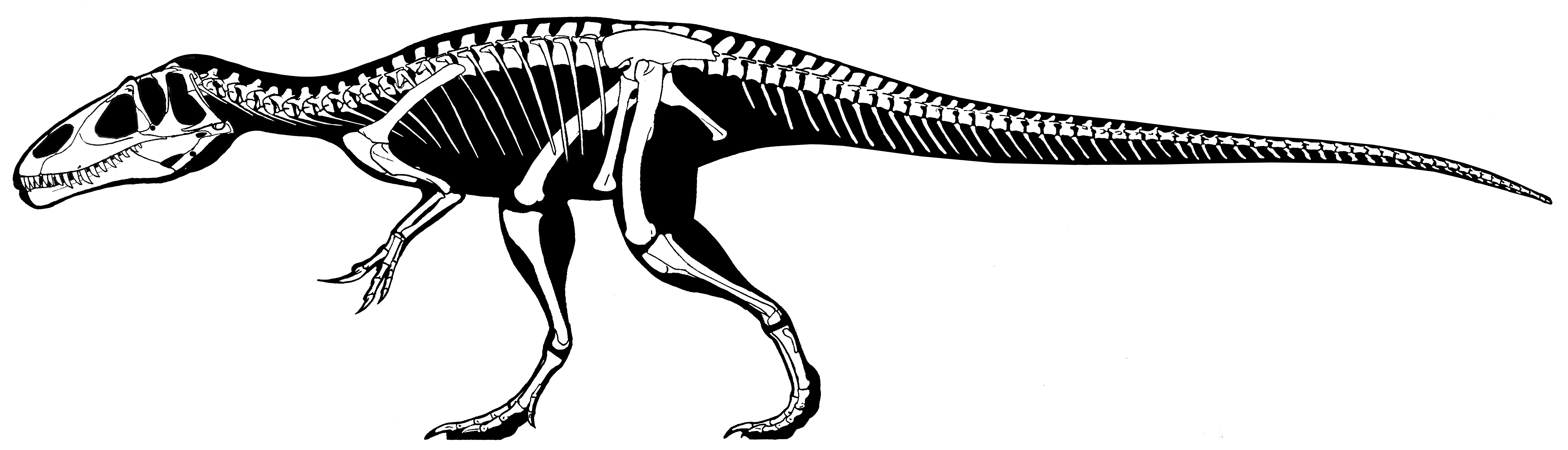
Modern skeletal restoration

In 2000, Oliver Walter Mischa Rauhut found that only minor differences in the hip bones — a more upward extending fusion of the "feet" of the pubic bones — make Eustreptospondylus different from a previously known megalosaurid called Magnosaurus, and in 2003 he proposed that they should be the same genus, which would make the full species name Magnosaurus oxoniensis. In 2010, Gregory S. Paul considered the species identical to Streptospondylus altdorfensis.

The first detailed description of the Eustreptospondylus material was in 1906 by Nopcsa. A modern description was published in 2008 by Rudyard Sadleir e.a. In 1964, Walker also named a second species of Eustreptospondylus: Eustreptospondylus divesensis, based on a French find. In 1977 this became the separate genus Piveteausaurus.

== Description ==
Size comparison of E. oxoniensis

The main specimen of Eustreptospondylus was not fully grown, and according to an estimate by Paul in 1988 was about 4.63 metres (15.2 ft) long and weighed about 218 kilograms (481 lb). Various estimates suggest that Eustreptospondylus was an "average-sized" theropod, with a hypothetical adult length of around 6 metres (20 ft), and a mass of 0.5 tonnes (0.49 long tons; 0.55 short tons).

The skull of Eustreptospondylus has a rather pointed snout in side view, with a large horizontally oriented nostril. There is no lacrimal horn. The skull roof is relatively thick. Oblique grooves in the jaw joints caused the gape of the mouth to be widened when the lower jaws were opened. These jaws at the front are rather tall and wide. No teeth have been preserved in either the upper or lower jaws, but the size of its toothsockets proves that the third tooth of the lower jaw was enlarged. Though not keeled, the front dorsal vertebrae have paired hypapophyses at their undersides, just as with Streptospondylus altdorfensis.

=== Distinguishing anatomical features ===
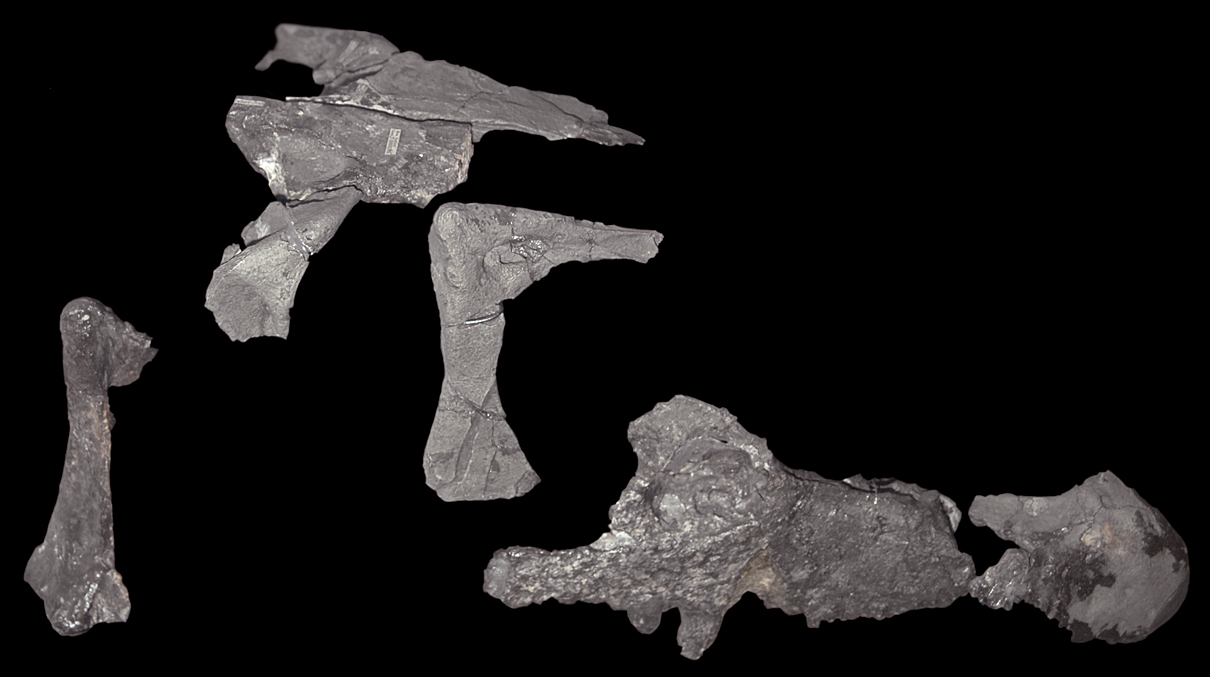
Skull fragments, NHM

Sadleir et al. (2008) established several traits that distinguish Eustreptospondylus from its direct relatives. In the corner of the lacrimal a shallow depression is present, which is pierced by a smaller foramen. The descending branch of the postorbital has a groove in its outer rear corner. The outer side of the squamosal has a well-developed drooping flange covering, in side view, the upper rear part of the lateral temporal fenestra. The tenth neck vertebra has a clear depression on its front underside. The neck and dorsal vertebrae are not keeled. In 2012 Matthew Carrano added to these traits. The peduncle of the ilium to which the pubic bone is attached, is as transversely wide as it is long from front to rear. With the rear blade of the ilium, the lower edge of the outer blade side is turned upwards to an almost horizontal position, creating and denuding over its total length a bone surface, the "brevis shelf", forming the internal face of the inner blade side — this shelf with dinosaurs functions as an attachment area for a tail muscle, the Musculus caudofemoralis brevis.

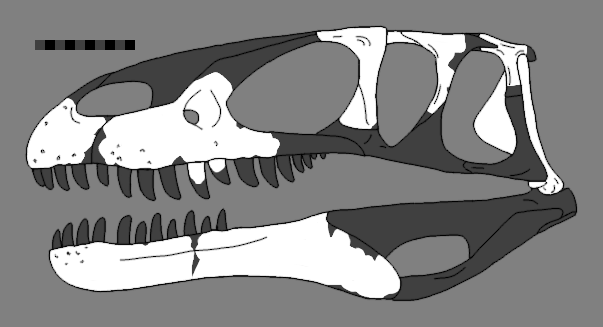
Reconstructed skull, showing known remains of the holotype in white

Sadleir also found additional traits proving that Eustreptospondylus differed from Magnosaurus nethercombensis in more than a single detail. The interdental plates reinforcing the back of the teeth are longer from front to rear than they are tall; with M. nethercombensis the opposite is true. Seen from above, the pubic bone forms transversely a more narrow part of the lower rim of the hip joint. Seen from behind, the upper part of the inner side of the thighbone is straight. The cnemial crest of the upper shinbone has no ridge running to the front and below, on its outer side.

== Classification ==
In 1964, Walker assigned Eustreptrospondylus to the Megalosauridae, which was historically included in a paraphyletic "Carnosauria", though sometimes a separate Eustreptospondylidae was recognised. Today Eustreptospondylus is commonly considered a member of the Eustreptospondylinae, clade within the Megalosauridae.

A possible position of Eustreptospondylus in the evolutionary tree is given by this cladogram based on a cladistic analysis by Carrano et.al.:

- Megalosauroidea
  - Piatnitzkysauridae
  - Megalosauria
    - Streptospondylus
    - Spinosauridae
    - Megalosauridae
      - Eustreptospondylinae
        - Eustreptospondylus
      - - Megalosaurinae
          - Duriavenator
          - - Megalosaurus
            - Torvosaurus
        - Afrovenatorinae
          - Afrovenator
          - - Dubreuillosaurus
            - Magnosaurus
          - - Leshansaurus
            - Piveteausaurus

== Paleobiology ==
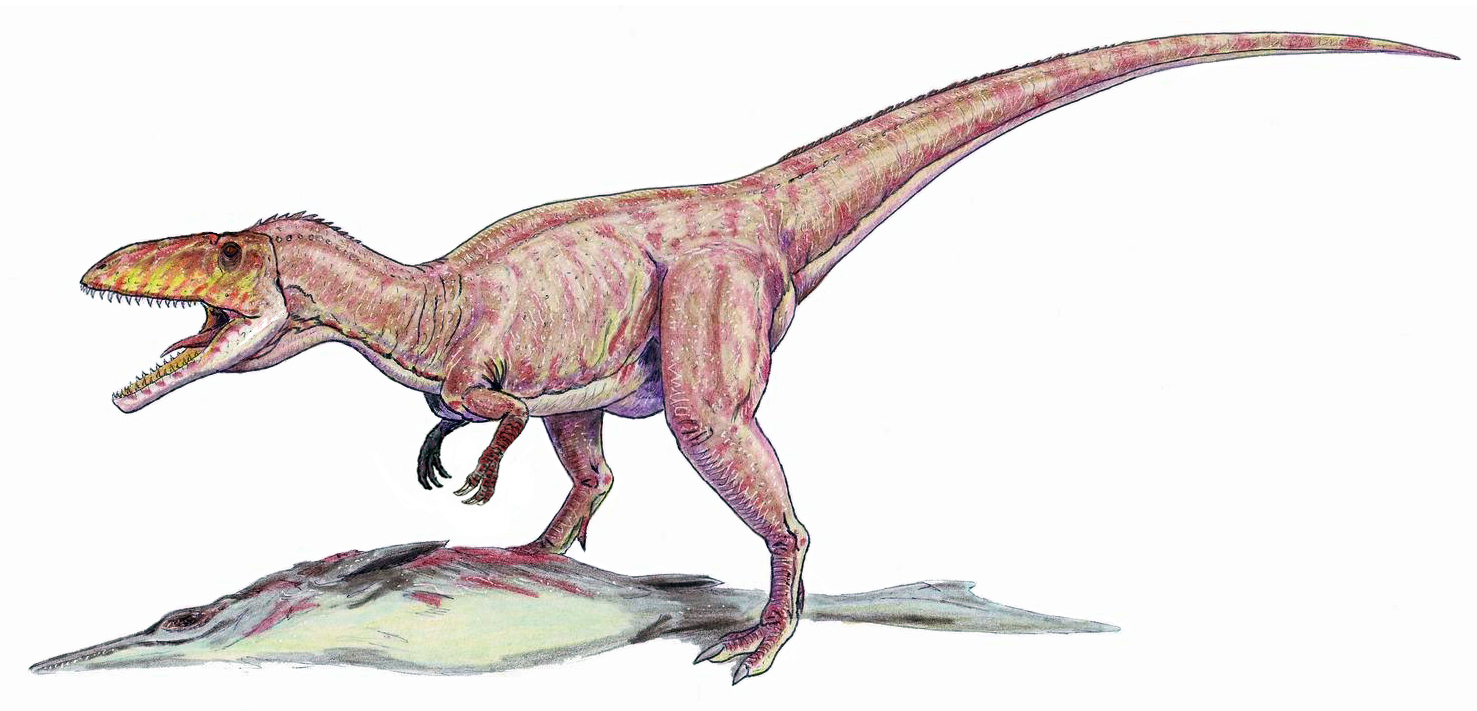
Eustreptospondylus feeding on an ichthyosaur

=== Diet ===
Eustreptospondylus, like many other theropods, fed on smaller dinosaurs and pterosaurs, or scavenged the carcasses of fishes, marine reptiles, and other dinosaurs. It might have foraged on shorelines for carcasses and marine life.

=== Swimming ===
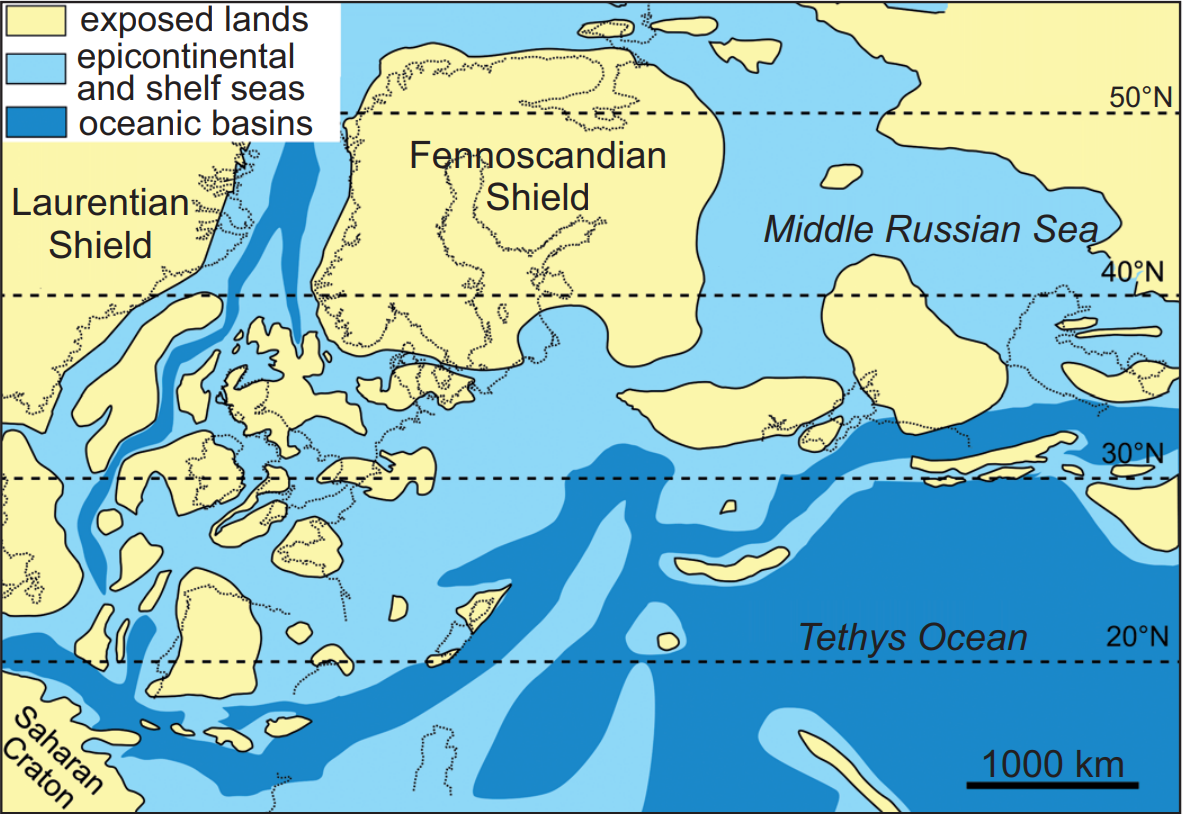
Paleogeographic map of Europe during the late Callovian, when Eustreptospondylus lived

Eustreptospondylus is known from a fossil from what was an island, at a time when Europe consisted mostly of archipelagos. This suggests that it might have been able to swim short distances. Eustreptospondylus has been considered a good swimmer, strong enough to swim from island to island like the modern day Komodo dragon. Not all palaeontologists agree with the swimming hypothesis. The opposing theories hold that the fossil of Eustreptospondylus was either swept out to sea during a flood after the animal died on the mainland, or it was carried to the ocean after it died in a river.

=== Insular dwarfism ===
Eustreptospondylus has been portrayed as a genus that evolved insular dwarfism. In 2000, David Martill and Darren Naish pointed out that the portrayal of the animal as an island-dwelling dwarf species was caused by not realizing that the holotype specimen represented a subadult.
