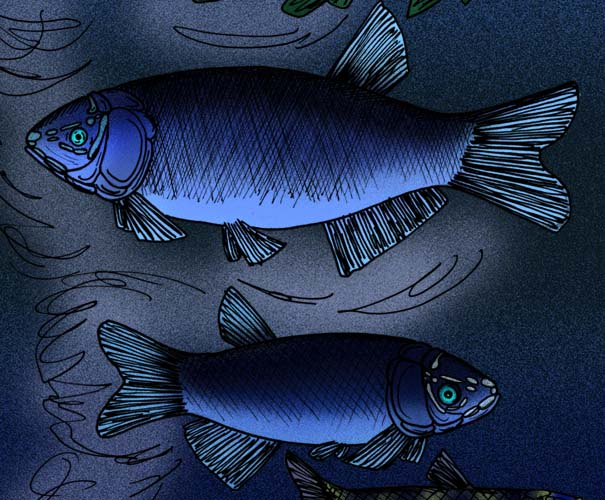
- Reconstruction of adult and juvenile

Scientific classification
- Kingdom: Animalia
- Phylum: Chordata
- Class: Actinopterygii
- Division: Teleostei
- Family: †Koonwarriidae; Waldman, 1971
- Genus: †Koonwarria; Waldman, 1971
- Species: †K. manifrons

Binomial name
- †Koonwarria manifrons Waldman, 1971

= Koonwarria =

Koonwarria Temporal range: Early Cretaceous (Aptian)

Extinct genus of ray-finned fishes

Koonwarria manifrons is an extinct species of freshwater ray-finned fish that lived in a polar lake in what is now Koonwarra, Victoria, Australia during the Early Cretaceous (Aptian) epoch. Fossils have been retrieved from the Koonwarra Fossil Bed, part of the Strzelecki Group.

Koonwarria manifrons shares many anatomical similarities with the family Archaeomaenidae, and is assumed to be descended from the archaeomaenids, but, is regarded as distinct enough to be placed in its own monotypic family, Koonwarriidae. It is known from 4 incomplete specimens, the largest of which is about 290 millimetres (0.95 ft) in length. Some authors assigned it to the Clupeiformes based on superficial similarities, but later studies have refuted this.

The lake that Koonwarria inhabited was situated in a cold, humid montane habitat, which experienced periods of polar night during the winter months. Some authors have suggested that the lake periodically froze over and thawed during the winter, leading to frequent die-offs of organisms, but other authors dispute this theory and suggest that these death assemblages are more indicative of frequent flooding.
