= Purlawaugh Formation =

Geologic formation in New South Wales

- Stratigraphic range: Toarcian-Oxfordian
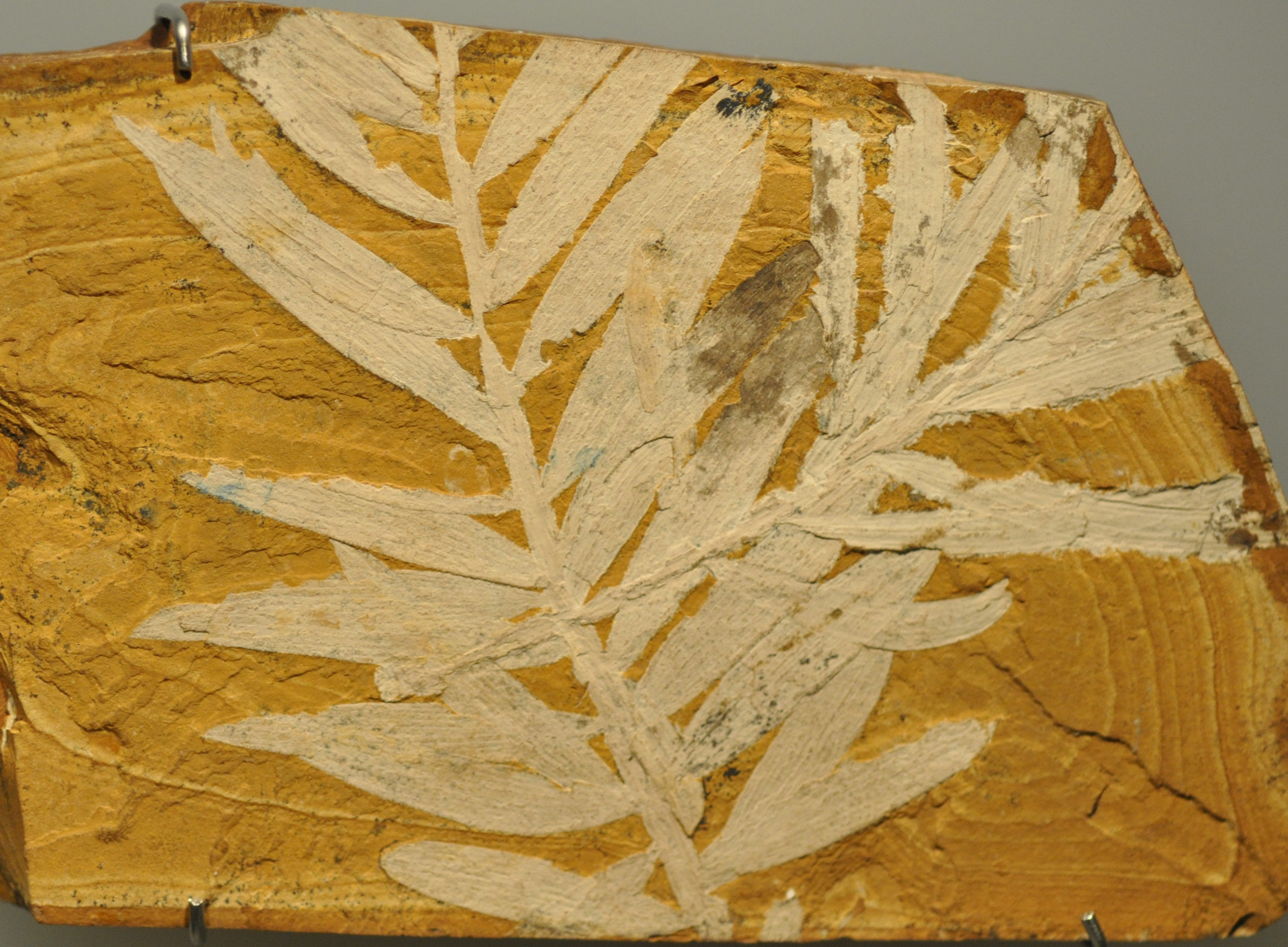
- Fossil plant (agathis jurassica) from the Purlawaugh Formation
- Type: Geological formation
- Sub-units: Comiala Shale & Merrygoen Ironstone Members
- Underlies: Pilliga Sandstone
- Overlies: Garrawilla Volcanics
- Thickness: Up to 100 m (330 ft)

Lithology
- Primary: Sandstone
- Other: Siltstone, mudstone, coal

Location
- Coordinates: 32.2°S 149.7°E
- Approximate paleocoordinates: 73.1°S 84.1°E
- Region: New South Wales
- Country: Australia
- Extent: Surat Basin
- Purlawaugh Formation (Australia) Purlawaugh Formation (New South Wales)

The Purlawaugh Formation is a Toarcian to Oxfordian geologic formation of New South Wales, Australia. The formation has provided many fossil fish and flora at the Talbragar fossil site.
