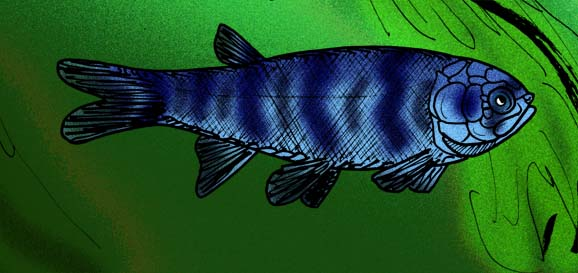
- Life restoration of Archaeomaene tenuis

Scientific classification
- Kingdom: Animalia
- Phylum: Chordata
- Class: Actinopterygii
- Division: Teleostei
- Family: †Archaeomaenidae; Boulenger, 1904

Genera
- †Aphnelepis?; †Archaeomaene (Type); †Gurvanichthys; †Oreochima; †Wadeichthys; †Zaxilepis

= Archaeomaenidae =

Archaeomaenidae Temporal range: Early Jurassic-Cretaceous

Extinct family of ray-finned fishes

Archaeomaenidae is an extinct family of stem-teleost fish found in freshwater environments of Jurassic New South Wales of Australia, China, and Antarctica, and in Lower Cretaceous New South Wales and Mongolia.

Archaeomaenidae was originally erected by the Belgian zoologist George Albert Boulenger for the (then) two species of Archaeomaene (A. tenuis and A. robustus) of the Talbragar fishbeds, which had originally been assigned to the family Pholidophoridae. It was later expanded to include the other Talbragar fish genera Aetheolepis and Aphnelepis as well. In 1941, Archaeomaene robustus was moved to the new genus Madariscus by R. T. Wade; however, a 2021 study found that this species most likely represents mature individuals of Archaeomaene tenuis, and is thus a junior synonym of it. Additionally, the archaeomaenid affinities of Aetheolepis and Aphnelepis have been questioned, with Aetheolepis more recently being interpreted as a member of the family Dapediidae instead. Archaeomaenidae has long been thought to be endemic to Australia, but the Asian genera Gurvanichthys of Mongolia and Zaxilepis of China, and the Antarctic genus Oreochima, suggest that the family had a much farther, possibly global range than traditionally assumed.

By the Early Cretaceous, only the Mongolian genus, Gurvanichthys, and Wadeichthys, and the archaeomaenids' apparent descendant, Koonwarria, survive, where the latter two genera form important components of the vertebrate fauna of the Koonwarra Fossil Bed in Victoria, Australia.

The cladogram below is simplified after a phylogenetic analysis by Bean (2021). Archaeomaenidae was recovered as one of the most basal stem-teleost clades, lying crownward of the families Pachycormidae and Aspidorhynchidae, but stemward of the family Pholidophoridae:

- Teleosteomorpha
  - Pachycormidae
  - - Aspidorhynchidae
    - Teleostei
      - Archaeomaenidae
        - Archaeomaene
        - - Gurvanichthys
          - Wadeichthys
          - - Oreochima
            - Zaxilepis
      - - Pholidophoridae
        - - Prohalecites
          - - Eurycormus
            - - Ankylophoridae
              - - Ichthyokentema
                - - Dorsetichthys
                  - - Leptolepis
                    - - Ascalaboidae
                      - - Varasichthyidae
                        - Crown group Teleostei
