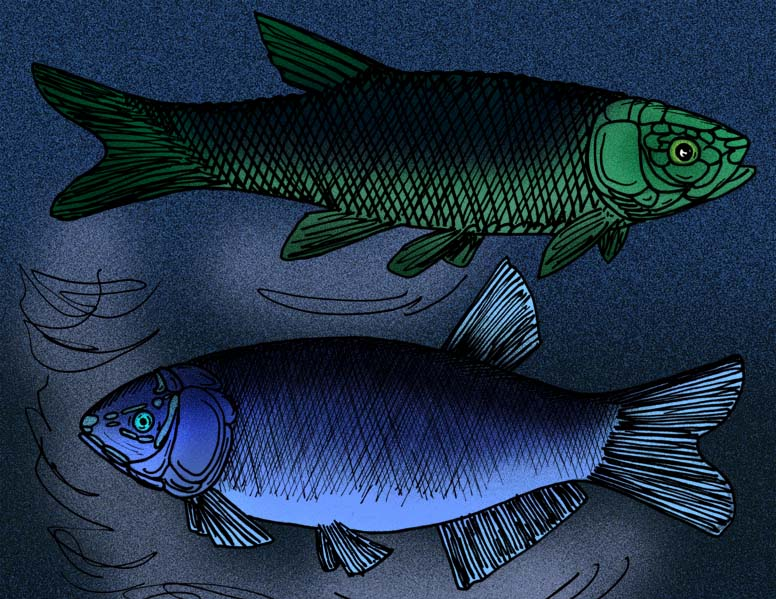
- W. oxyops and Koonwarria

Scientific classification
- Kingdom: Animalia
- Phylum: Chordata
- Class: Actinopterygii
- Division: Teleostei
- Family: †Archaeomaenidae
- Genus: †Wadeichthys; Waldman, 1971
- Species: †W. oxyops

Binomial name
- †Wadeichthys oxyops Waldman, 1971

= Wadeichthys =

Wadeichthys Temporal range: Lower Cretaceous

Extinct genus of ray-finned fishes

Wadeichthys oxyops is an extinct archaeomaenid bony fish from the Koonwarra Lake fauna of Lower Cretaceous Victoria, Australia. If the related genus Koonwarria is regarded as being in a different family, then W. oxyops is the only known Cretaceous-aged archaeomaenid from Australia (ignoring the Mongolian Gurvanichthys).

== History and palaeontology ==
Fossils of Wadeichthys were excavated during extensive work on the Koonwarra Fossil Bed in Victoria. The site is located approximately 145 kilometres southeast of Melbourne near Leongatha in South Gippsland and has been dated 118-115 million years old through fossils of fish, worms, bird feathers, fleas, spiders and crabs. The site was discovered in 1962 and was immediately recognized as an important site, known for "the wide diversity, abundance and quality of preservation of its fossil content." This excavation was completed by a team of students from Monash University led by Palaeontologists Michael Waldman and Jim Warren. Warren went on to present his findings on the environmental setting of the Koonwarra Fossil Bed to the public in 1970 in an ABC documentary entitled Digging up Ancestors. Warren showcased the Wadeichthys species and presented his hypothesis of the paleo-environment resulting in the mass fish "winterkills".

Access to the site was initially limited through its proximity to a highway, abrupt annihilation at an adjacent railway cutting and 8 metre thickness. In 1966, bulldozers were used to strip the overburden at Koonwarra of an area of 600m^{2}and palaeontologists at the site removed 14-16m^{3} of rock from the fossil bearing layer. However, problems began to arise when it came to reducing the rock without harming fossils. To combat this, rocks were weathered at the Zoology/Comparative Physiology building at Monash University through spreading them out over flat roofs before splitting them. This allowed for large numbers of well-preserved fossils to be found with little damage. The fish bed is divided into two parts and occurs within a thickness of 7.1 metres of mudstone made up of graded laminae, which are composed layers of alternating claystone and siltstone. This was interpreted by Waldman and Warren as a result of seasonal anoxia related to ice formation and thawing. An accumulation of varved sediment was the result, in which Wadeichthys fossils were well preserved. The lower part of the fish bed is laminated and 0.23 metres thick, containing much larger fish fossils than the upper. Between these two parts, there is a stratum of siltstone that may be split into thin sheets 6-12mm thick. The upper part was 1.24 metres thick and contained a large number of incomplete fish and plant fossils. Above the upper fish bed there was a mudstone succession that was weathered to a stiff clay.

Wadeichthys is the second smallest of the five species of extinct fish found at Koonwarra. These five families of extinct fish known from the Koonwarra fossil bed include Ceratodontidae (Dipnoi), Leptolepididae (Clupeiformes), Archaeomaenidae (Pholidophoriformes), Coccolepididae (Palaeonisciformes) and Koonnwarriidae. Palaeontologist Stephen Poropat identifies this site as "one of the great fossil localities of the Mesozoic era", earning it the name of Koonwarra Lagerstätte. The term Lagerstätte translates to 'storeroom place' and was coined by German palaeontologist Dolf Seilacher in 1970 to describe a site of where fossil are both abundant and exceptionally preserved.
