= Michael Waldman (palaeontologist) =

British palaeontologist (1941–2025)

- Born: Michael Waldmann; 1941; London, England
- Died: 27 July 2025 (aged 83); Worton, North Yorkshire, England
- Occupation: Palaeontologist
- Known for: Work on fossil fish, mammals, and reptiles
- Spouse: Hazel Mills
- Children: 3

Michael Waldman (1941 – 27 July 2025) was a British palaeontologist known for his work on fossilised fish, mammals, and reptiles. He discovered the globally important fossil site of Cladach a'Ghlinne, near Elgol on the Isle of Skye, Scotland, in 1971. This site exposes the Kilmaluag Formation and provides a valuable record of Middle Jurassic ecosystems. During the 1970s he visited the site several times with fellow palaeontologist Robert Savage.

The fossil turtle Eileanchelys waldmani was named after Waldman in recognition of his notable contributions to palaeontology.

== Academic career ==
Waldman gained his PhD at Monash University in 1968. He worked as a research assistant at University of Bristol in the early 1970s working alongside Robert Savage. Later in the 1970s he started teaching at Stowe School, Buckinghamshire, England, UK.

Waldman named several fossil taxa during his research career. These include the Cretaceous fish Wadeichthys oxyops, the theropod dinosaur Duriavenator hesperis, the mammaliaform Borealestes, and the tritylodontid, Stereognathus hebridicus (although S. hebridicus is now thought to be a junior synonym to S. ooliticus). He also discovered, along with his fieldwork colleagues, some of the most complete mammal fossils ever found in the UK.

Waldman also contributed to the anatomical understanding of the lepidosauromorph Marmoretta.

Waldman retired from teaching in 2002.

== Personal life and death ==
Waldman was born Michael Waldmann in south-west London, England, to Rose (née Pushkin), a secretary and Myer Waldmann, who was a banker. Myer Waldman, who was known as Max, died in 1949 when Mike was eight years old.

Waldman married Hazel Mills, a primary school teacher, in Bristol in 1965. The couple left for Australia by ship the day after the marriage, where they lived for a couple of years before moving to Canada; they returned to the UK in 1970 and went on to have three children.

Waldman died at home in Worton, North Yorkshire, on 27 July 2025, aged 83.

== Publications ==
- Waldman, M., 1968. Fish from the freshwater Lower Cretaceous, near Koonwarra, Victoria, Australia: with comments on the palaeo-environment (Doctoral dissertation, Monash University).
- Waldman, M., 1970. Comments on a Cretaceous coprolite from Alberta, Canada. Canadian Journal of Earth Sciences, 7(3), pp. 1008-1012.
- Waldman, M. 1971. Fish from the freshwater Lower Cretaceous of Victoria, Australia with comments on the palaeo-environment. Special Papers in Palaeontology 9: 1–62.
- Waldman, M. and Savage, R.J.G., 1972. The first Jurassic mammal from Scotland. Journal of the Geological Society, 128(2), 119-125.
- Waldman, M. 1974. Megalosaurids from the Bajocian (Middle Jurassic) of Dorset. Palaeontology, 17(2), 325–339.
- Waldman, M. and Evans, S.E., 1994. Lepidosauromorph reptiles from the Middle Jurassic of Skye. Zoological Journal of the Linnean Society, 112(1-2), 135-150.
- Evans, S.E. and Waldman, M., 1996. Small reptiles and amphibians from the Middle Jurassic of Skye, Scotland. Museum of Northern Arizona Bulletin, 60, 219-226.
