= Alick Walker =

British palaeontologist (1925-1999)

Alick Donald Walker (26 October 1925 – 4 December 1999) was a British palaeontologist, after whom the Alwalkeria genus of dinosaur is named.

He was born in Skirpenbeck, near York and attended Pocklington School from 1936 to 1943. He began a degree course in engineering at Cambridge, but dropped out in 1944. In 1948 he returned to university after national service, reading Geology at the University of Bristol. On graduation, he joined the research group of Professor Stanley Westoll at the University of Newcastle upon Tyne, working on the fossil reptiles of the Late Triassic found in Elgin. He was appointed Lecturer in Geology in 1954, while working on his PhD.

The bony remains of the Elgin reptile fossils were poor, sometimes just indentations in rocks. Walker devised a new casting method to capture the anatomical information in these fossils, using PVC; many of the resulting casts are now in the National Museum of Scotland and the Natural History Museum. His early work was also notable for reclassifying and naming the English theropod dinosaurs Eustreptospondylus and Metriacanthosaurus.

In the late 1960s Walker studied the origin of crocodilians and of birds, which became controversial in 1972 with his publication of a paper in Nature arguing for a close relationship between sphenosuchian crocodylomorphs and birds. He later accepted that this hypothesis might be incorrect in a 1985 paper on Archaeopteryx.

== Selected publications ==
- Walker A. D. 1964. Triassic reptiles from the Elgin area: Ornithosuchus and the origin of carnosaurs. Philosophical Transactions of the Royal Society of London B 248: 53–134.
- Walker A. D. 1972. New light on the origin of birds and crocodiles. Nature 237: 257–263
- Walker A. D. 1985. The braincase of Archaeopteryx. In: Hecht M. K., Ostrom J. H., Viohl G., Wellnhofer P., eds. The Beginnings of Birds, pp. 123–134. Freunde des Jura-Museums Eichstätt, Germany.
