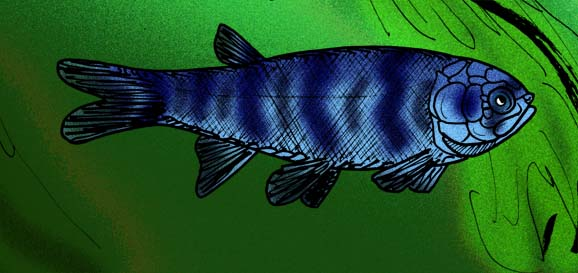
- Life restoration
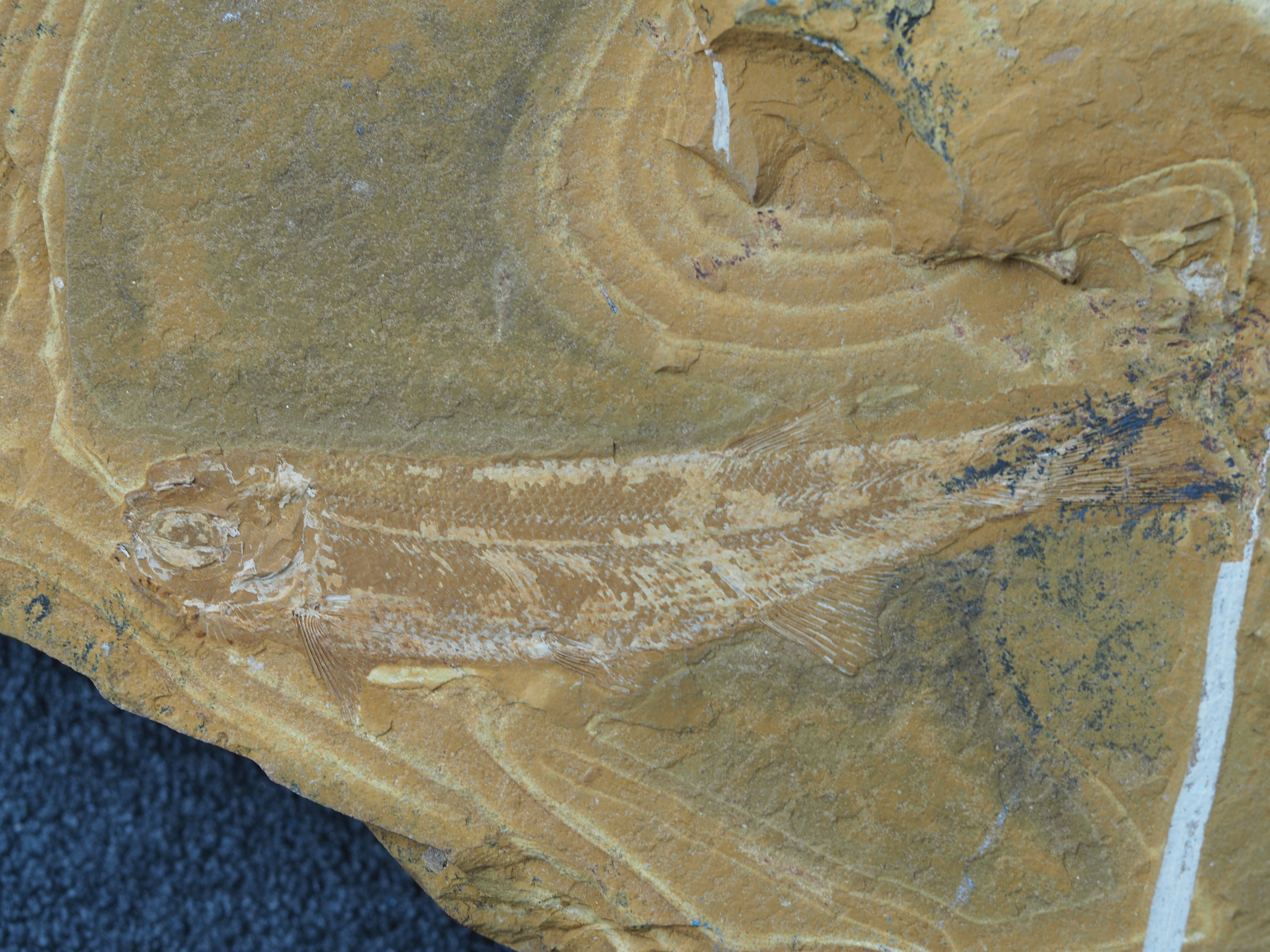
- Fossil specimen of Archaeomaene tenuis (Woodward, 1895) from Talbragar, NSW, Australia

Scientific classification
- Kingdom: Animalia
- Phylum: Chordata
- Class: Actinopterygii
- Division: Teleostei
- Family: †Archaeomaenidae
- Genus: †Archaeomaene; Woodward, 1895
- Species: †A. tenuis

Binomial name
- †Archaeomaene tenuis Woodward, 1895

Synonyms
- Archaeomaene robustus; Madariscus robustus

= Archaeomaene =

Archaeomaene Temporal range: Tithonian, ~151 Ma

Extinct genus of ray-finned fishes

Archaeomaene is an extinct genus of freshwater ray-finned fish that lived in what is now Australia during the Late Jurassic (Tithonian age). It is a monotypic genus, containing only the species Archaeomaene tenuis, which is known from the Talbragar River beds of New South Wales.
