= Aetheolepis =

Aetheolepis Temporal range: Early Jurassic to Middle Jurassic

Scientific classification
- Kingdom: Animalia
- Phylum: Chordata
- Class: Actinopterygii
- Family: †Dapediidae
- Genus: †Aetheolepis; Woodward, 1895
- Species: †A. mirabilis

Binomial name
- †Aetheolepis mirabilis Woodward, 1895

Extinct genus of ray-finned fishes

Aetheolepis is an extinct genus of ray-finned fish which lived in freshwater environments in what is now Western Australia and New South Wales during the Jurassic period. It contains one species, A. mirabilis. Aetheolepis was previously thought to be an archaeomaenid, until a 2016 study instead recovered it as a member of the family Dapediidae. Like other dapediids, it had a deep, discoid-shaped body. Fossils of A. mirabilis have been found in the Talbragar River fossil beds of New South Wales and the Colalura Sandstone of Western Australia. It was named by Arthur Smith Woodward in 1865 along with other Talbragar fish.

== See also ==
- List of prehistoric bony fish genera
