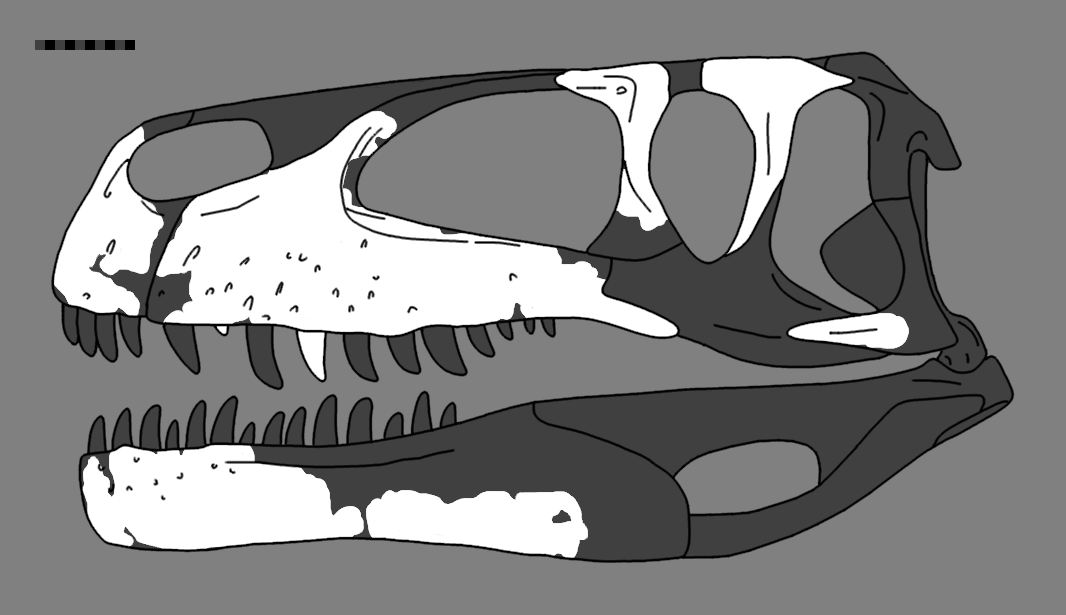
- Remains of the skull

Scientific classification
- Kingdom: Animalia
- Phylum: Chordata
- Class: Reptilia
- Clade: Dinosauria
- Clade: Saurischia
- Clade: Theropoda
- Family: †Megalosauridae
- Subfamily: †Megalosaurinae
- Genus: †Wiehenvenator; Rauhut et al, 2016

Type species
- †Wiehenvenator albati Rauhut et al, 2016

= Wiehenvenator =

Wiehenvenator Temporal range: Callovian ~166–164 Ma

Extinct genus of dinosaurs

Wiehenvenator is a genus of megalosaurid theropod dinosaur from the Middle Jurassic (Callovian) of north western Germany. The genus contains a single species, W. albati.

== Discovery and naming ==
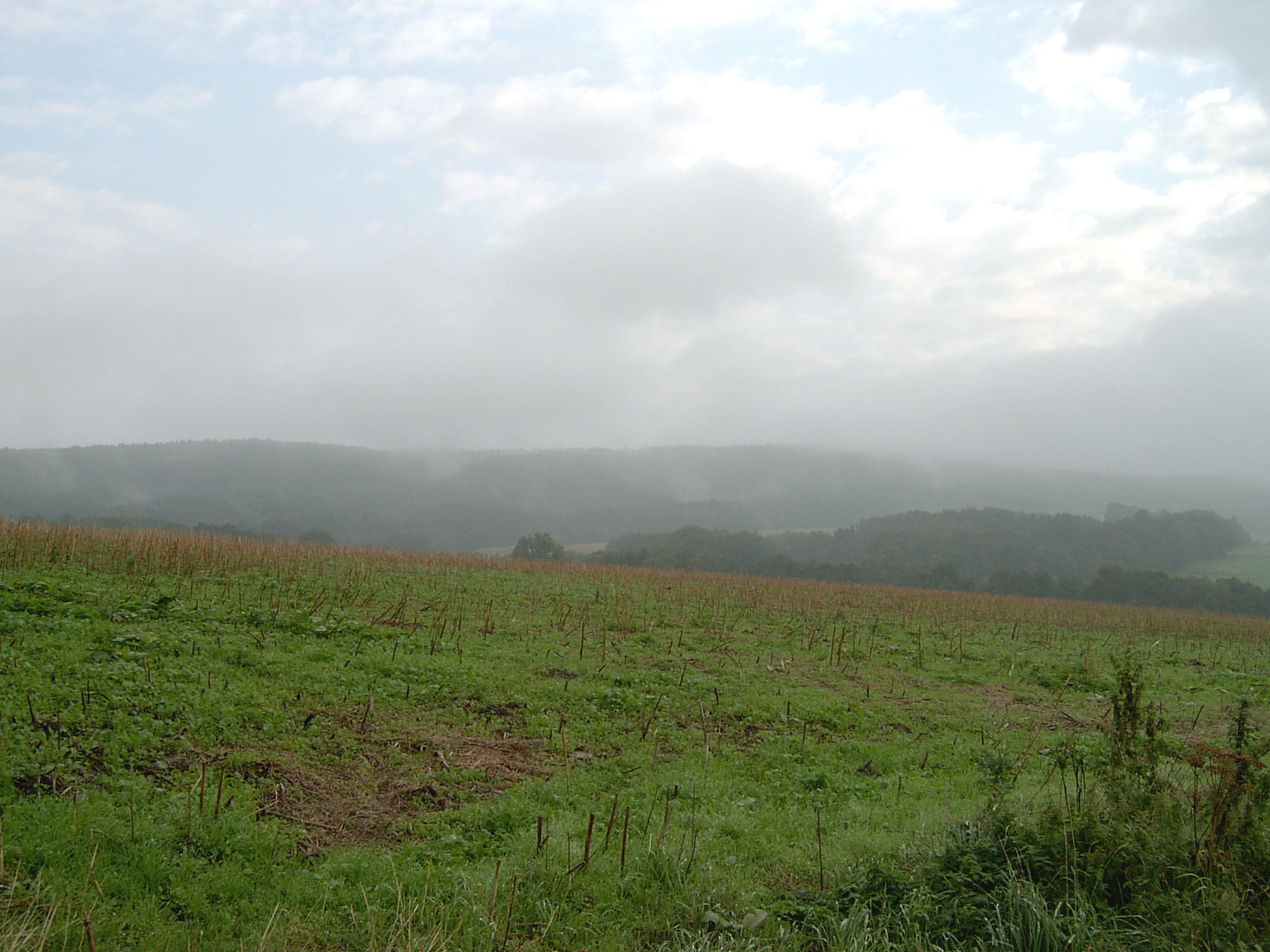
Landscape of the Wiehen Hills, where Wiehenvenator remains have been found

In 1998, geologist Friedrich Albat, prospecting for the Landschaftsverband Westfalen-Lippe Museum of Natural History, discovered the remains of a large theropod at the abandoned Pott quarry in the Wiehen Hills near Minden, Westphalia. The remains were discovered within the Ornatenton Formation, a geological formation composed mainly of mudstone, sandstones, and a horizon of carbonate concretions. The fragmentary theropod skeleton, found alongside abundant marine invertebrates and fossilized wood, was excavated between October 1998 and October 2001. At the time of their discovery, the bones were heavily weathered out of the surrounding sediments and are somewhat poorly preserved. The numerous breaks and cracks found in the material risked being destroyed upon removal from the matrix, and so led the excavation team to instead extract them into jackets that were then later prepared in the laboratories of the LWL Museum für Naturkunde.

The find received extensive press attention and was informally known as Das Monster von Minden (the Minden Monster). Reports in the German edition of the National Geographic of a rib 50% larger than that of Allosaurus stirred speculations that it reached 15 metres (49 ft) in length. Thomas Holtz estimated it at 12 metres (39 ft) in 2012. Other researchers concluded to smaller dimensions: Mickey Mortimer in 2003 estimated the animal to be 7 to 8 metres (23 to 26 ft) in length and 0.75 to 1.2 metric tons (0.83 to 1.32 short tons) in weight.

In 2015, it was announced that the find had been identified as a new species of megalosaurid. In 2016, the fossils were named and described as the type species Wiehenvenator albati by Oliver W. M. Rauhut, Tom R. Hübner and Klaus-Peter Lanser. The generic name combines a reference to the Wiehengebirge, the German name of the Wiehen Hills, with a Latin venator ("hunter"). The specific name honours Friedrich Albat, the discoverer. As the name was published in an electronic publication, Life Science Identifiers were needed for its validity. These were 95638CFF-5618-4D31-9086-D821F6EE6B39 for the genus and 262FA776-9ABC-4565-9A17-931CB4BEFBFC for the species.

A megalosauroid pedal phalanx ((WMNM P27698, P27693) from the Ornatenton Formation discovered in two parts during October 1999 and April 2000 may have belonged to the holotype of W. albati.

== Description ==
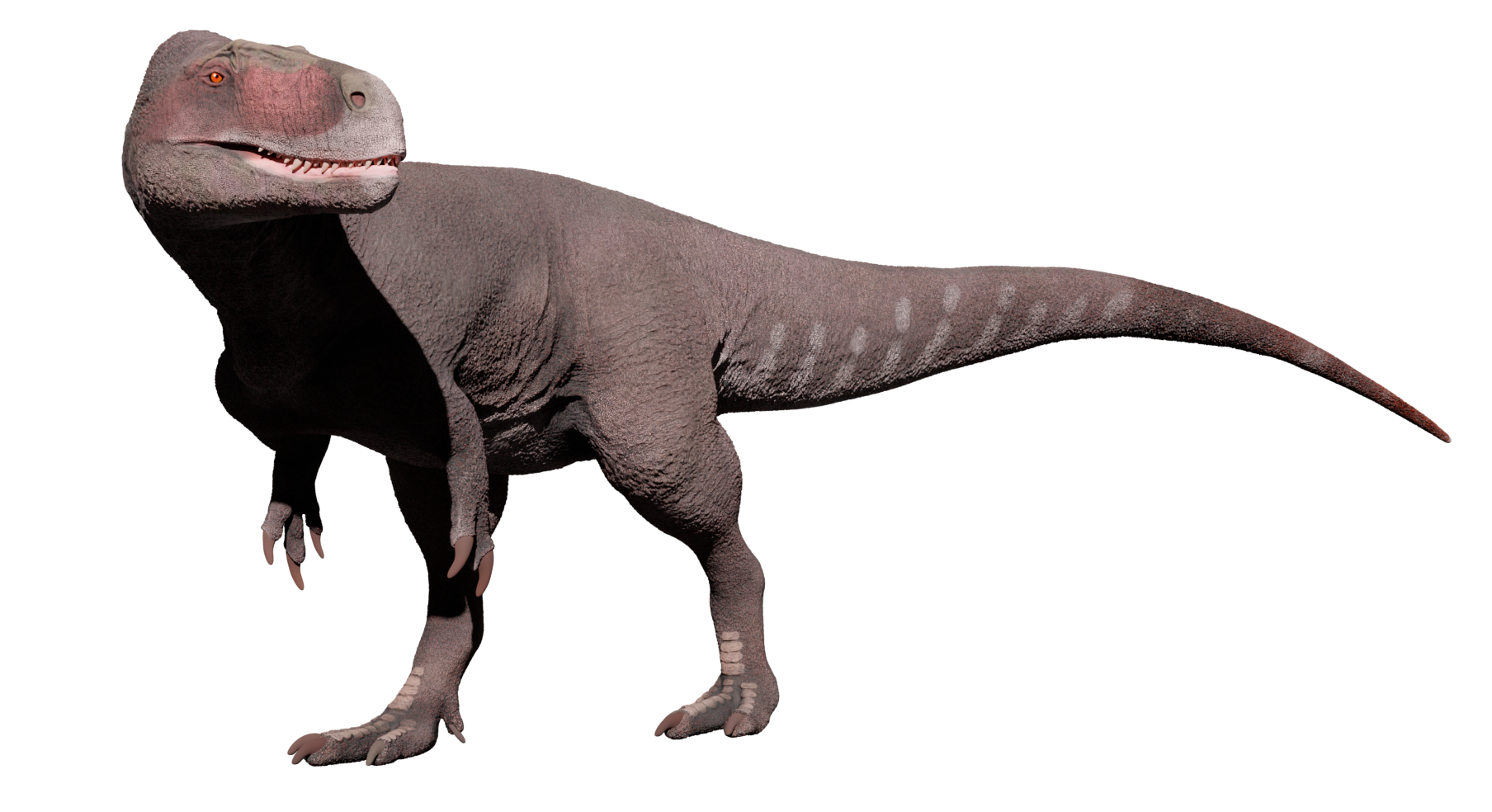
Restoration based on Torvosaurus, a close relative

The type specimen of Wiehenvenator consists of an assortment of bones found in the Ornatenton Formation dating from the middle Callovian. They include parts of the skull (right premaxilla, right maxilla, right lacrimal bone, right postorbital and possible front branch of the right quadratojugal), the anterior parts of a right lower jaw (dentary), six teeth, three tail vertebrae, a pair of fused median segments of rear gastralia, one complete rib and four rib fragments, a finger phalanx, both fibulae, a right astragalus and a right calcaneum. All these bones were seen as belonging to a single individual. Two additional tail vertebrae may also belong to it. Histological analysis of its fibulae suggests that the holotype of Wiehenvenator albati was at least in its ninth year of life, however, the age at death might have been well over ten years. The remains indicated that the animal was actively growing, but narrow growth zones indicated that the skeletal growth rate was slowing down. From this it can be determined that the growth state of Wiehenvenator was that of a large subadult individual.

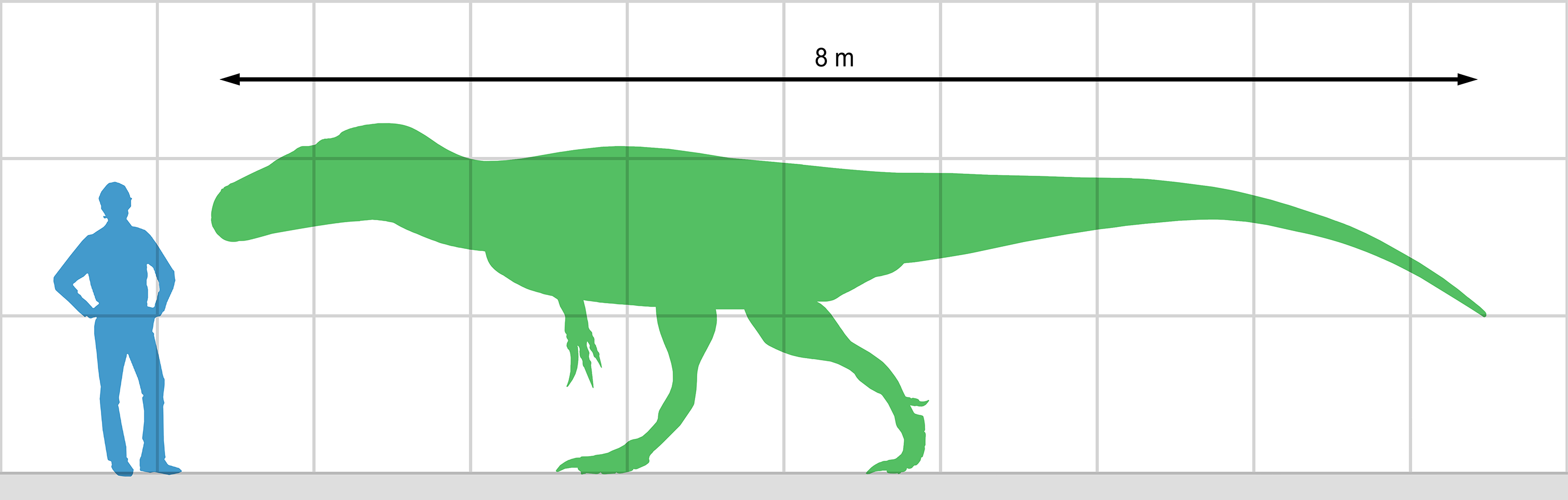
Size of Wiehenvenator compared to a human

The length of Wiehenvenator can be estimated by extrapolating from its maxilla, which has 82 percent of the length of the maxilla of Torvosaurus gurneyi, itself estimated at 10 metres (33 ft). Another estimate can be gleaned from the fact that its tail vertebrae and fibulae are roughly equal in length to those of Torvosaurus tanneri, which had been estimated at 9 metres (30 ft), thus making Wiehenvenator one of the largest known European theropods. Another study estimated Wiehenvenator at 9–10 metres (30–33 ft) in length with a skull length of 1–1.05 metres (3.3–3.4 ft).

== Classification ==
In 2016, Wiehenvenator was placed in the Megalosauridae as a sister taxon to Torvosaurus. The following is a cladogram based on the phylogenetic analysis conducted by Rauhut et al., showing the relationships of Wiehenvenator.

- Megalosauridae
  - - - Eustreptospondylus
    - - Dubreuillosaurus
      - Magnosaurus
      - Afrovenator
      - Piveteausaurus
  - - - Duriavenator
      - - Megalosaurus
        - - Wiehenvenator
          - Torvosaurus

== Paleoecology ==
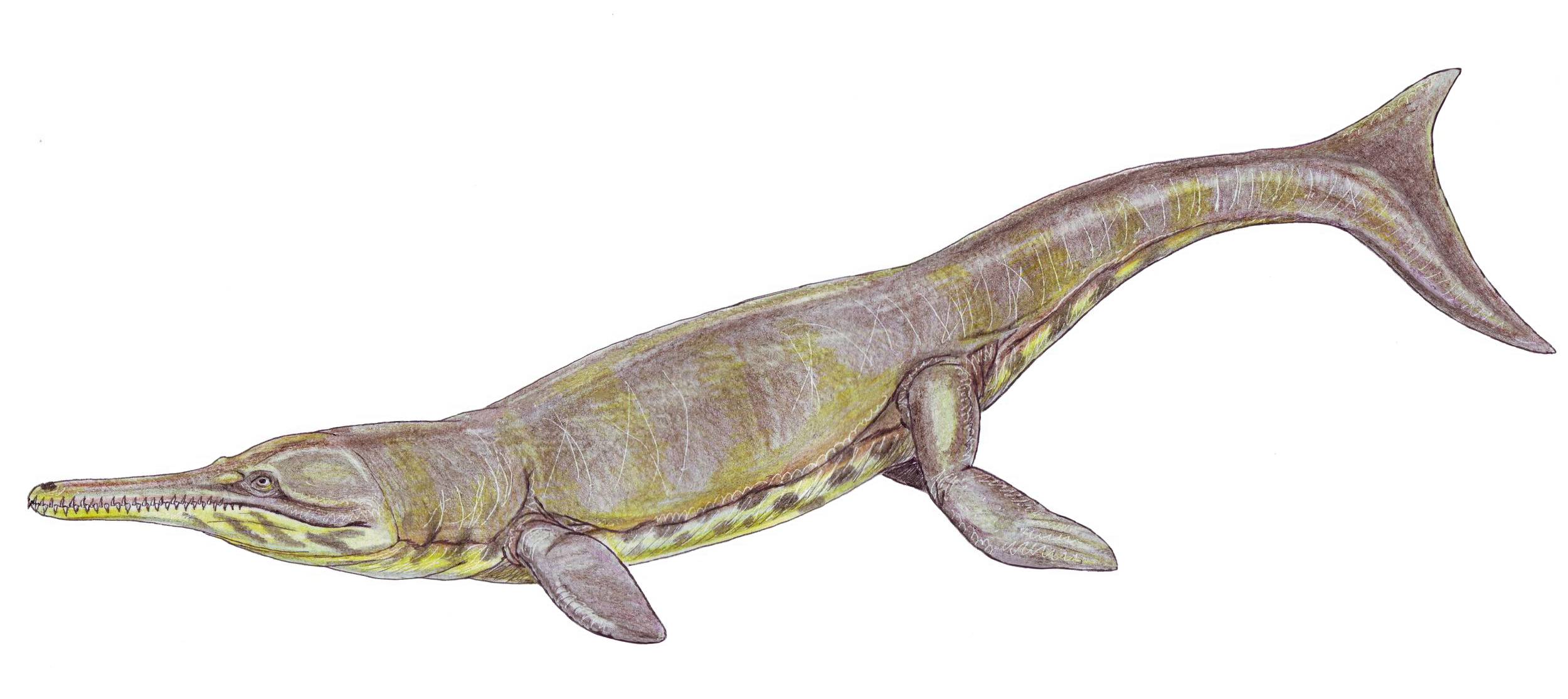
Restoration of Metriorhynchus, of which remains have been found alongside Wiehenvenator

After discovering the initial remains of Wiehenvenator, members of the excavation team returned to the site and continued to search the surroundings for further material. After searching 35m both east and west of the Ornatenton Formation, some weathered vertebral centra and teeth of Liopleurodon were found. One year later, in mid-October 1999, the remains consisting of a maxillary fragment, bone fragments, and a tooth, of a second theropod were found 28.5 m north-west of the first locality. On October 3, 2014, in an overgrown quarry to the west, the skull and lower jaws of the crocodylomorph Metriorhynchus were discovered by an honorary member of the LWL Museum für Naturkunde. These multiple discoveries imply a potential for more material to be found in the future.

== See also ==
- 2016 in paleontology
