= Ornatenton Formation =

Jurassic marine formation in Germany

- Stratigraphic range: Callovian
- Type: Geological formation
- Sub-units: Macrocephalae Subformation, Ornatenton Subformation, Glaukonitsandmergel Subformation
- Underlies: Kandern Formation, Impressamergel Formation
- Overlies: Variansmergel Formation
- Thickness: up to 50 m (160 ft)

Lithology
- Primary: Mudstone
- Other: Sandstone

Location
- Country: Germany

Type section
- Named for: Kosmoceras ornatum
- Named by: Bloos, Dietl and Schweigert
- Year defined: 2005

The Ornatenton Formation is a Jurassic marine formation in Germany that is middle Callovian in age. The formation represents a shallow marine environment.

== History and naming ==
The Ornatenton Formation was named by Gert Bloos, Gerd Dietl and Günter Schweigert in 2005. This southern German Jurassic layer had already been previously referred to as the 'Ornatenton' by Friedrich August von Quenstedt in 1857. The formation was named after the ammonite Ammonitus ornatus, today known as Kosmoceras ornatum. A type locality has not yet been determined.

== Definition and distribution area ==
The Ornatenton Formation is composed mainly of mudstone with some iron-oolith benches, glauconitic sandstones, and a horizon of carbonate concretions. It stretches from the Eastern Alps to the Rhine valley, and the facies area stretches into Switzerland where it is known as the 'argovian' facies. In southern Germany, the formation is underlain by the Variansmergel Formation and regionally overlapped by the Kandern or Impressamergel Formation, while in the Wutach area it is replaced by the Wutach Formation. Further east, in the French Alps, it dovetails with the Sengenthal Formation. Its thickness varies from a few meters in the Swabian Jura up to about 50 metres (160 ft) in the Plettenberg area.

Stratigraphic context of the Ornatenton Formation

== Time frame and subdivision ==
The Ornatenton Formation is divided into three subformations: the Macrocephalae Subformation, the Ornatenton Subformation, and the Glaukonitsandmergel Subformation. Some of the sediments of the Ornatenton Formation are dated to the upper Bathonian, but most were deposited during the Callovian. The formation locally reaches into the lower Oxfordian.

== Fossil content ==
The remains of dinosaurs and marine reptiles are known from the Ornatenton Formation alongside a rich invertebrate fauna including the oyster Gryphaea dilatata along with the ammonites Clydoniceras discus, Bullatimorphies bullatus, Macrocephalites gracilis, Reineckeia anceps, Erymnoceras coronatum, Peltoceras athleta, Quenstedtoceras lamberti, Quenstedtoceras mariae, and Cardioceras cordatum.

Color key: Taxon / Reclassified taxon / Taxon falsely reported as present / Dubious taxon or junior synonym / Ichnotaxon / Ootaxon / Morphotaxon	Notes; Uncertain or tentative taxa are in small text; ~~crossed out~~ taxa are discredited.

=== Dinosaurs ===
==== Theropods ====
Theropods of the Ornatenton Formation
Genus	Species	Location	Stratigraphic position	Material	Notes	Image
Wiehenvenator	W. albati			Partial skeleton belonging to a single individual.	A large megalosaurid	
Torvosaurus	T. sp.			Fragmentary maxilla	A large megalosaurid	
Megalosauroidea indet.	Indeterminate			Pedal phalanx	Probably belongs either to the same specimen as the Ornatenton maxilla of Torvosaurus or the holotype of Wiehenvenator	

=== Thalattosuchians ===
Thalattosuchians of the Ornatenton Formation
Genus	Species	Location	Stratigraphic position	Material	Notes	Image
Metriorhynchus	M. sp.			A skull and lower jaws.	A metriorhynchid	

=== Plesiosaurs ===
Plesiosaurs of the Ornatenton Formation
Genus	Species	Location	Stratigraphic position	Material	Notes	Image
Liopleurodon	L. sp.			Vertebral centra and teeth.	A pliosaurid	

=== Crustaceans ===
Crustaceans of the Ornatenton Formation
Genus	Species	Location	Stratigraphic position	Material	Notes	Image
Eumorphia	E. fabianmuelleri				A mecochirid decapod	

=== Echinoderms ===
Echinoderms of the Ornatenton Formation
Genus	Species	Location	Stratigraphic position	Material	Notes	Image
Borszczia	B. wallueckensis				A cribeline paxillosidan	
Diademopsis	D. wallueckensis				A pedinid sea urchin	
Ophiomalleus	O. beneficarum				A ophiacanthid brittle star	
Plumaster	P. echinoides				a plumasterid sea star	
Polycidaris	P. vadeti				A polycidarid pencil urchin	
Procidaris	P. relicta				A miocidarid pencil urchin	
