= Ronan Allain =

French paleontologist

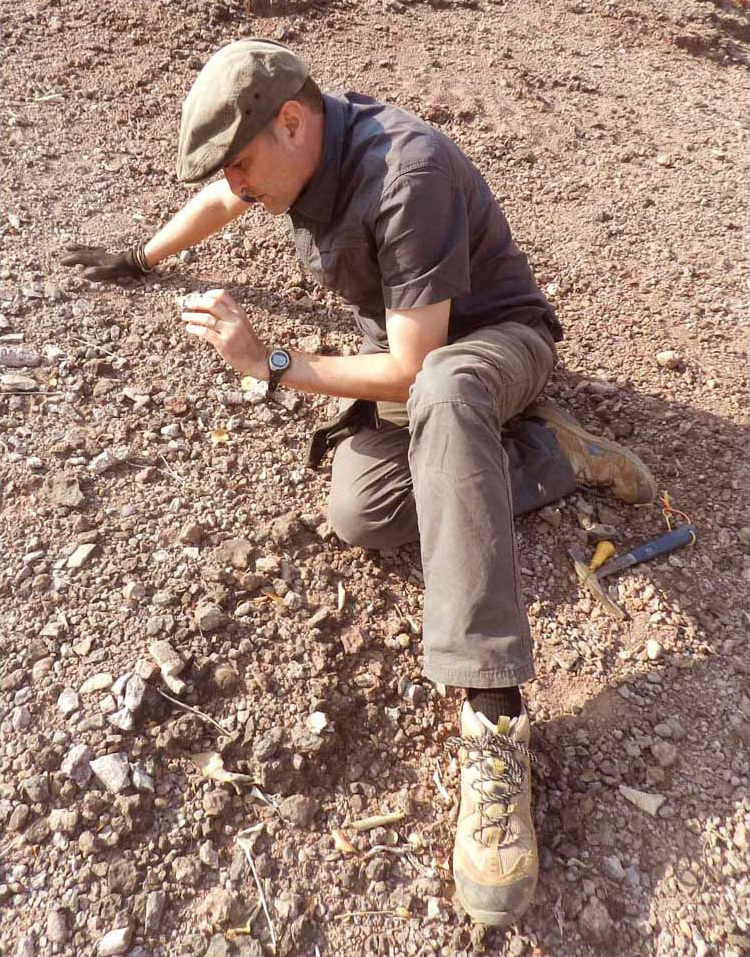
- Ronan Allain during excavations in Laos, 2016
- Born: 15 March 1974 (age 51)
- Known for: Research on theropod dinosaurs; discovery of new dinosaur genera including Ichthyovenator
- Awards: Fallot-Jérèmine Prize of the French Academy of Sciences (2025)
- Scientific career
- Fields: Paleontology
- Institutions: Muséum national d'histoire naturelle

Ronan Allain (born 15 March 1974) is a French paleontologist who serves as the curator of the fossil reptile and bird collections at the Muséum national d'histoire naturelle (MNHN) in Paris, located at the Jardin des plantes complex.

== Biography ==
He is a specialist in dinosaurs, and in 2002 successfully defended a doctoral thesis on a group of carnivorous dinosaurs, the Megalosauridae, at the Muséum national d'histoire naturelle. The jury included Armand de Ricqlès and Daniel Goujet.

In 2012, together with an international team, he participated in the discovery of a new genus of dinosaur, Ichthyovenator, in the Savannakhet Province of Laos. Since August 2010, he has taken part in excavations at the Angeac-Charente fossil site and managed to reconstruct the nearly complete skeleton of a new ornithomimosaur.

Ronan Allain has described several new species of dinosaurs belonging to the genera Tangvayosaurus, Pyroraptor, Dubreuillosaurus, Streptospondylus, Erectopus, Tazoudasaurus, Berberosaurus, Ichthyovenator, Rebbachisaurus, Poekilopleuron and Vouivria.

On 28 October 2025, he received the Fallot-Jérèmine Prize of the French Academy of Sciences for his fieldwork.

== Selected works ==
- Allain, Ronan (2000). Larousse explore – Les dinosaures. Paris: Larousse. ISBN 2035650356.
- Allain, Ronan, et al. (2004). Les dinosaures. Paris: Play Bac Éditions, Les docs des Incollables. ISBN 2842036778.
- Allain, Ronan, et al. (2004). Les Premiers hommes. Paris: Play Bac Éditions, Les docs des Incollables. ISBN 2842036743.
- Allain, Ronan (2012). Histoire des dinosaures. Paris: Perrin. ISBN 2262036403.
- Mimo, sur la trace des dinos (2012), with Mazan, Isabelle Dethan, and Jean-François Tournepiche. Éditions Eidola.
- Mimo et les dinosaures des antipodes (2015), with Mazan, Isabelle Dethan, and Jean-François Tournepiche.
- Les dinosaures, ce qu'on ne sait pas encore (2016), with Anna Alter. Paris: Éditions Le Pommier.
- Dinosaures, les géants du vignoble (2017), with Jean-François Tournepiche, Mazan, and Dominique Abit.
