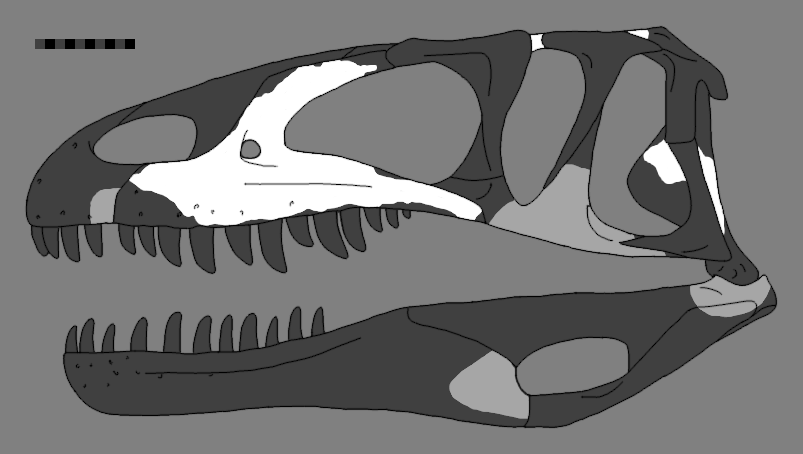
- Skull reconstruction showing known material (white and light grey)

Scientific classification
- Kingdom: Animalia
- Phylum: Chordata
- Class: Reptilia
- Clade: Dinosauria
- Clade: Saurischia
- Clade: Theropoda
- Family: †Megalosauridae
- Subfamily: †Afrovenatorinae
- Genus: †Leshansaurus; Li et al., 2009

Type species
- †Leshansaurus qianweiensis Li et al., 2009

= Leshansaurus =

Leshansaurus Temporal range: Late Jurassic, 161.2–155.7 Ma

Extinct genus of dinosaurs

Leshansaurus is a genus of theropod dinosaur from the Late Jurassic Shaximiao Formation of what is now China. It was described in 2009 by a team of Chinese paleontologists. The type species is Leshansaurus qianweiensis. Fossils of Leshansaurus were discovered in strata from the Shangshaximiao Formation, a formation rich in dinosaur fossils. Li et al. referred this taxon to Sinraptoridae – a group of carnosaurian theropods, but it may belong to Megalosauridae instead.

== Discovery and naming ==
The holotype (QW 200701) was found in 2007. It is a fairly complete skeleton consisting of a partial skull and lower jaws, seven cervical vertebrae, twelve dorsal vertebrae, five sacral vertebrae, two caudal vertebrae, and much of the hind limbs and hands. A second specimen (QW 200702), an isolated femur from a juvenile, has been designated as the paratype.

Leshansaurus qianweiensis was named and described in 2009 by Li Fei, Peng Guangzhao, Ye Yong, Jiang Shan, and Huang Daxi. The generic name refers to Leshan, a nearby city in Sichuan, China, and the specific epithet refers to Qianwei, the county in which the fossils were found.

== Description ==
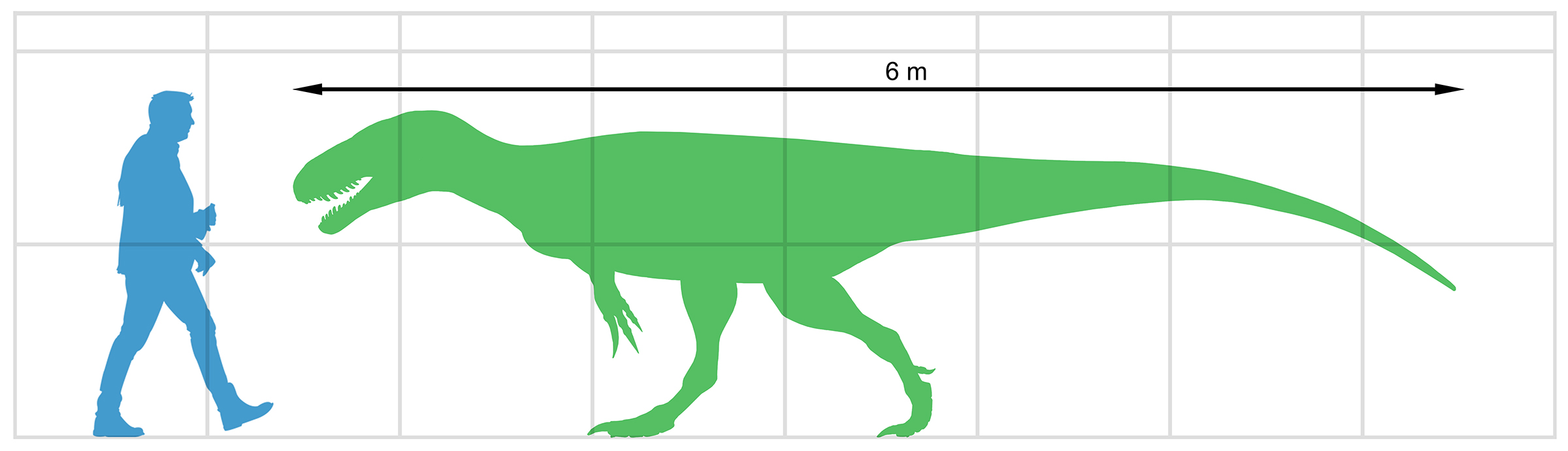
Size of Leshansaurus compared to a human

Leshansaurus was a medium-sized theropod that would have had a length of six to seven meters, and a hip height of about one and a half meters.

Leshansaurus has an elongated skull that is broader towards the front. The femur has a length of 62 centimeters, and the tibia has a length of 52 centimeters. Its autapomorphies (unique characteristics) are the possession of a sharp central ridge on the supraoccipital (the bone above the occipital), elongated frontal bones that are 2.86 times as long as they are wide, slender basipterygoid projections on the basisphenoid, a bone of the lower braincase, an atlas intercentrum that is horseshoe-shaped in cross-section, slender diapophyses, thin spines of the dorsal vertebrae and sacral vertebrae, the possession of a clear keel at the bottom of the sacral vertebrae, and an ilium with on the inner side a distinct ridge along the edge of the hip joint.

== Phylogeny ==
The describers placed Leshansaurus in the Sinraptoridae, but they did not carry out a cladistic analysis. An analysis by Matthew Carrano in 2012 found it to be a member of the megalosaurid Afrovenatorinae, as sister species of Piveteausaurus, a taxon known only from a braincase nearly identical to that of Leshansaurus. The phylogenetic position of Leshansaurus according to Carrano et al. (2012) is shown by this cladogram:

- Megalosauroidea
  - Piatnitzkysauridae
  - Megalosauria
    - Streptospondylus
    - Spinosauridae
    - Megalosauridae
      - Eustreptospondylinae
        - Eustreptospondylus
      - - Megalosaurinae
          - Duriavenator
          - - Megalosaurus
            - Torvosaurus
        - Afrovenatorinae
          - Afrovenator
          - - Dubreuillosaurus
            - Magnosaurus
          - - Leshansaurus
            - Piveteausaurus
