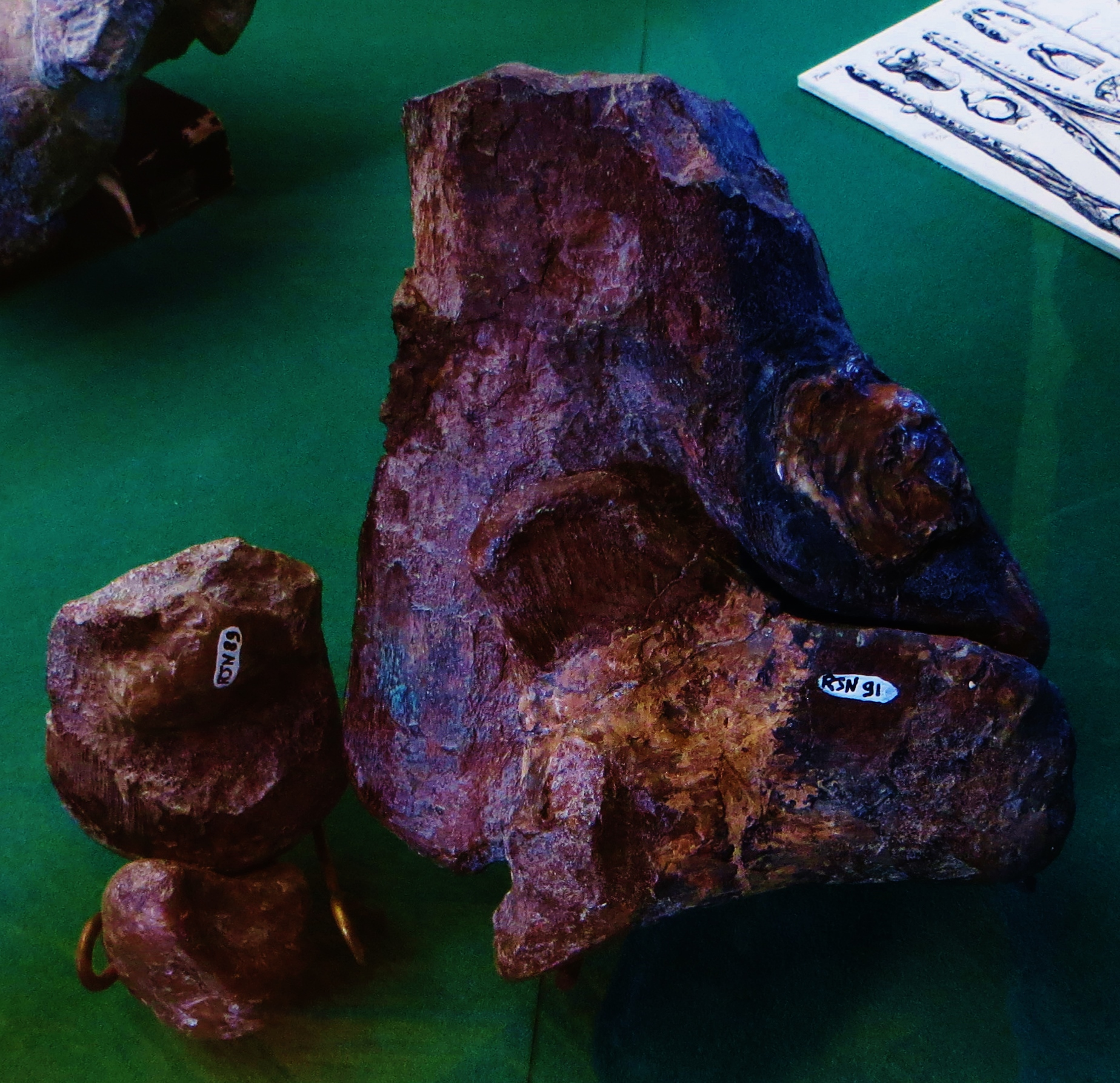
- Tibia, astragalus and calcaneum of Streptospondylus altdorfensis at the Gallery of Paleontology and Comparative Anatomy, Paris.

Scientific classification
- Kingdom: Animalia
- Phylum: Chordata
- Class: Reptilia
- Clade: Dinosauria
- Clade: Saurischia
- Clade: Theropoda
- Clade: †Megalosauria
- Genus: †Streptospondylus von Meyer, 1832
- Species: †S. altdorfensis

Binomial name
- †Streptospondylus altdorfensis von Meyer, 1832

Synonyms
- Laelaps gallicus Cope, 1867

= Streptospondylus =

Streptospondylus Temporal range: Late Jurassic, 161 Ma

Extinct genus of dinosaurs

Streptospondylus, (Ancient Greek στρεπτός (streptós), meaning "twisted", and σπόνδυλος (spóndulos), meaning "vertebra",) is a genus of megalosaurid theropod dinosaur known from the Late Jurassic period of France, 161 million years ago. It was a medium-sized predator with an estimated length of 6 meters (19.5 ft) and a weight of 500 kg (1,100 lbs).

== Discovery and naming ==
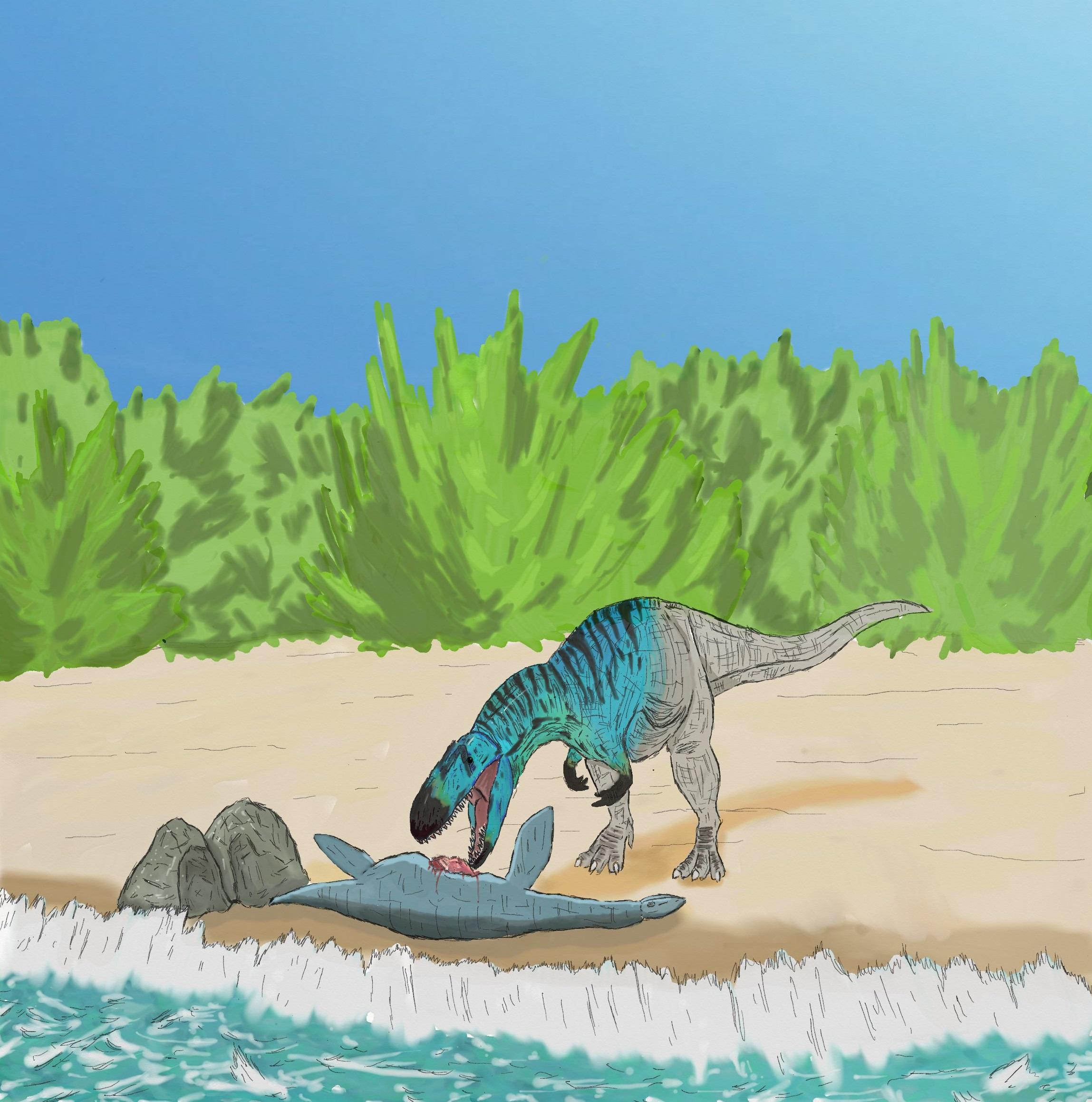
Speculative life restoration in its habitat

Streptospondylus was one of the first dinosaurs collected and was the first described, though not the first dinosaur named.

In 1778, abbey Charles Bacheley, a Norman naturalist, reported the presence of fossil bones in the Callovo-Oxfordian formations, either the Marnes de Dives or the overlying Marnes de Villers, probably the former, exposed at the foot of the Vaches Noires cliffs between Villers-sur-Mer and Houlgate. These fossil materials contained theropod vertebrae and marine crocodilian remains. After the death of Bacheley, his fossil cabinet was acquired by the "Ecole centrale de Rouen". Louis-Benoît Guersent (1777–1848), professor of natural history in this school, drew the attention of Georges Cuvier to these remarkable fossil bones. With the agreement of the prefect of Seine-Inférieure, count Jacques Claude Beugnot, Guersent sent the collection to the Muséum National d'Histoire Naturelle in Paris. In 1800, these fossils were briefly mentioned by Georges Cuvier who misspelled the name of their former owner as Bachelet.

In 1808, Cuvier scientifically described the theropod vertebrae as the first dinosaur remains ever. However, he considered them to be crocodilian and associated them with fossils of the Teleosauridae and the Metriorhynchidae. In 1822, Cuvier by the work of Henry De La Bèche became aware that these finds were very disparate, stemming from different periods. He abstained from naming them but in 1824 concluded that there were two main types. In 1825 Étienne Geoffroy Saint-Hilaire accordingly named two crocodilian skulls as the genus Steneosaurus, the one, specimen MNHN 8900, becoming Steneosaurus rostromajor, the other, MNHN 8902, S. rostrominor.

In 1832 however, the German paleontologist Christian Erich Hermann von Meyer split the material. Steneosaurus rostrominor was renamed Metriorhynchus geoffroyii while Steneosaurus rostromajor became Streptospondylus altdorfensis. To the last species the theropod remains were referred. The genus name comes from Ancient Greek στρεπτός (streptós), meaning "twisted", and σπόνδυλος (spóndulos), meaning "vertebra", alluding to the fact that the vertebrae differed from typical crocodile elements in being opisthocoel: convex in front and concave behind. The specific name refers to Altdorf where some teleosaurid remains had also been found. Von Meyer's name was the first binomial name (also) referring to a theropod.

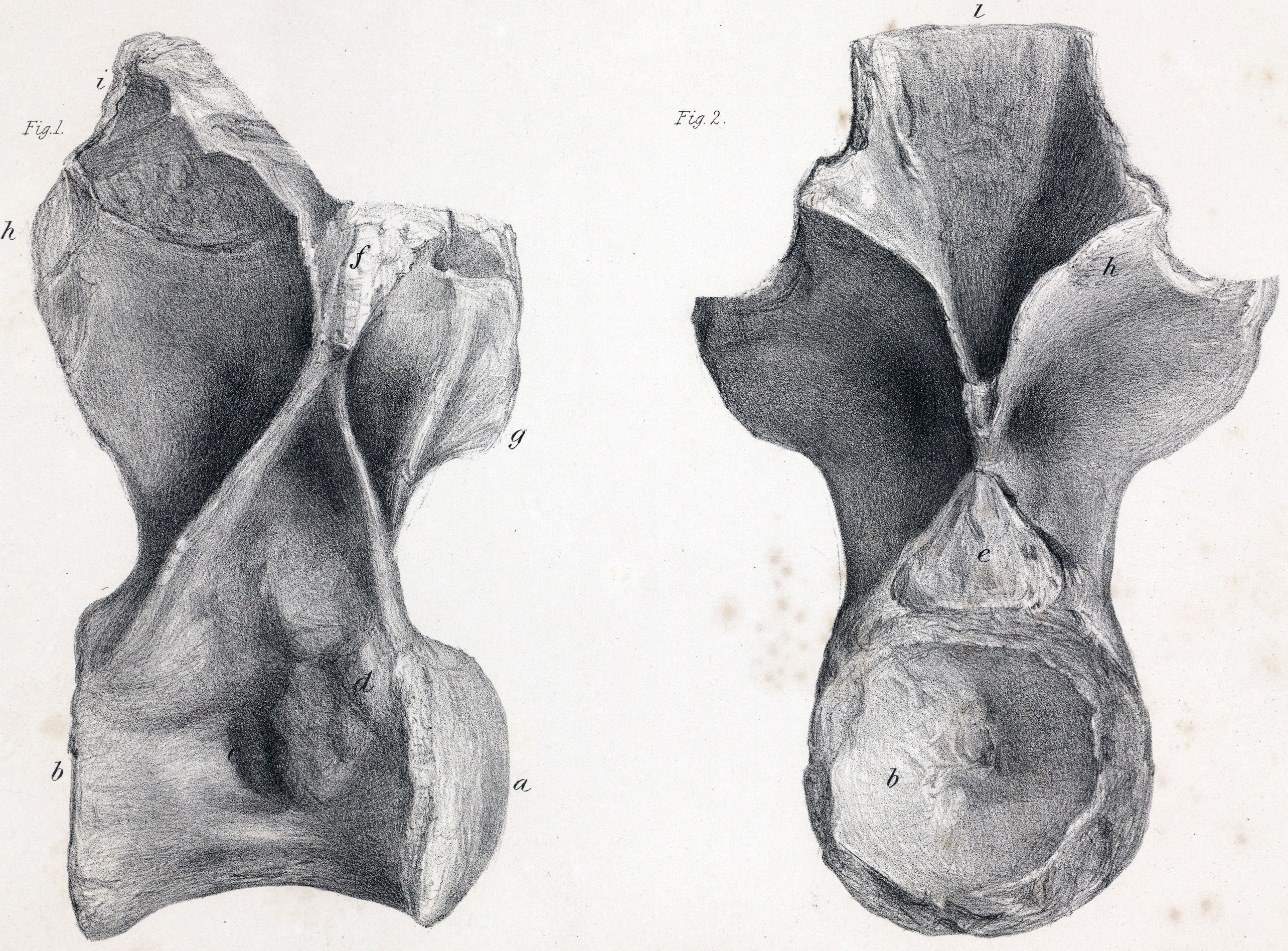
Type specimen of S. cuvieri

In 1842 Richard Owen pointed out that von Meyer had been incorrect in changing the original specific name and created the correct combination Streptospondylus rostromajor for Streptospondylus altdorfensis. At the same time he created a second species: Streptospondylus cuvieri based on a single damaged vertebra from the Bajocian, found near Chipping Norton. In 1861, Owen would refer the entire Cuvier material to S. cuvieri, despite the fact that if it were cospecific the name S. rostromajor would have priority. From that time S. cuvieri was generally accepted in the literature as the valid name, though some workers split off the theropod remains from the crocodilian bones, Edward Drinker Cope in 1867 naming a Laelaps gallicus and Friedrich von Huene in 1909 a Megalosaurus cuvieri.

In 1964, Alick Donald Walker discovered Owen's mistake, referring the entire theropod material to the new species Eustreptospondylus divesensis which, however, had a skull not belonging to the Cuvier material as the type specimen, MNHN 1920–7. In 1977 Philippe Taquet created the genus Piveteausaurus for this species.

In 2001, Ronan Allain concluded that no connection could be proven between Piveteausaurus and the referred other theropod material from Normandy. He also pointed out that the skull von Meyer had based Streptospondylus altdorfensis on was in fact a composite of bones from two species, since named Steneosaurus edwardsi Deslongchamps 1866 and Metriorynchus superciliosum Blainville 1853 (Steel 1973). A lectotype had never been chosen from one of the composite parts to give the name Streptospondylus priority over either one of these species. Allain used this situation to remove all the crocodilian material from the Streptospondylus type by designating the complete (postcranial) theropod material as the lectotype. As Steneosaurus rostromajor had been based on the composite skull, the epithet rostromajor now no longer had priority over altdorfensis. This way in 2001 Streptospondylus altdorfensis became the valid name and type species of a theropod. Laelaps gallicus and Megalosaurus cuvieri are its objective junior synonyms.

The lectotype specimens, MNHN 8605-09, 8787-89, 8793-94, 8907, were probably found at the coast in layers of the Falaises des Vaches Noires near Calvados, dating from the late Callovian or early Oxfordian, about 161 million years old. They consist of several vertebrae series, single vertebrae, a partial left pubis and limb elements. The longest vertebra has a length of 97 millimetres, indicating a total body length of about seven metres. Also a partial left femur, MNHN 9645, has been referred. Streptospondylus has been diagnosed by the unique bifurcation (split) of the hypapophyses (processes which extend from the lower surface of a vertebra) in the anterior dorsal vertebrae.

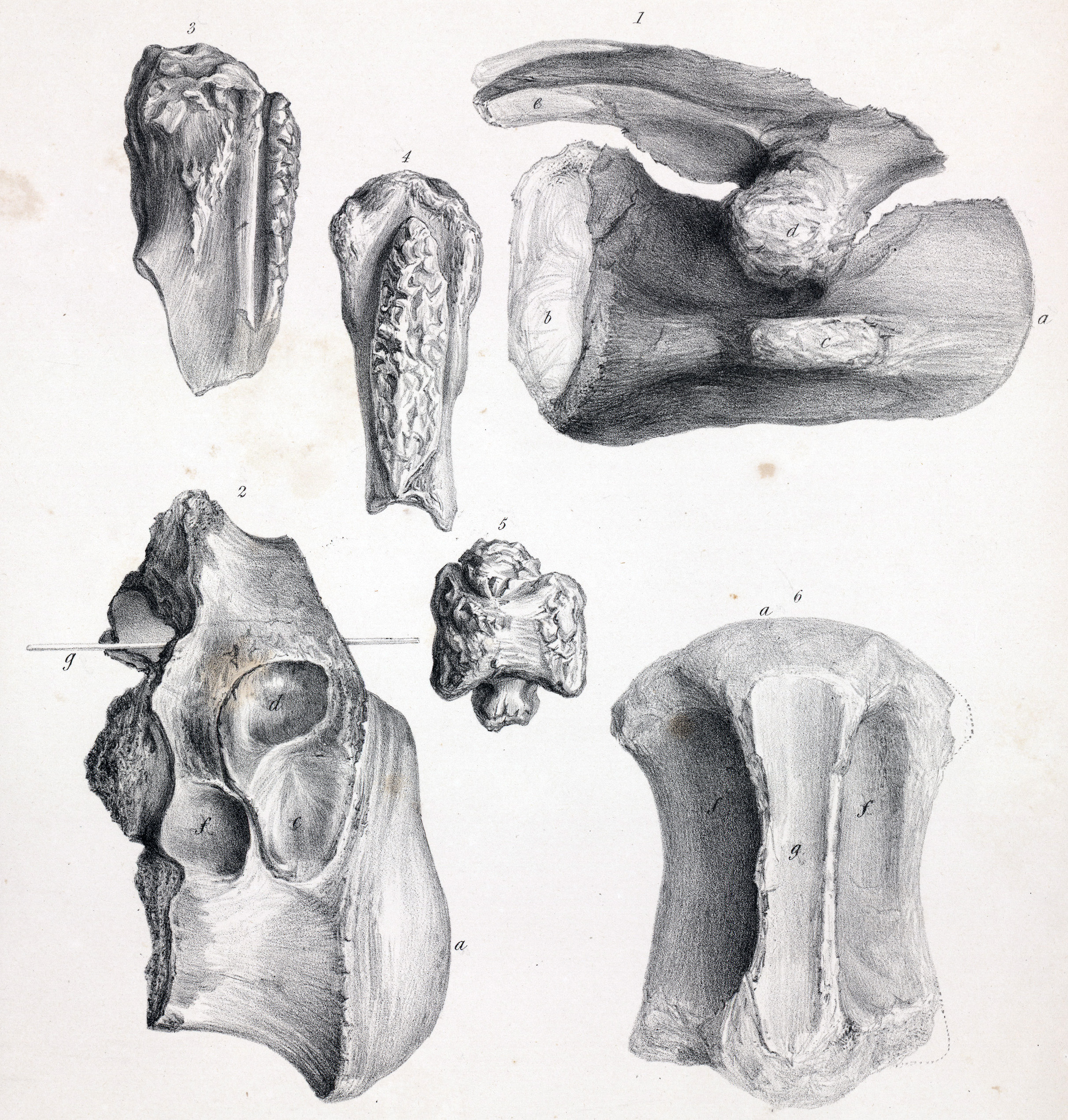
Material referred to S. major by Owen

Owen also named two other species, S. major (S. recentior is a museum label for syntype specimens) and S. meyeri, of which the former is based on iguanodont material. His S. cuvieri, of which the type specimen is lost, is today considered a nomen dubium.

In 2010 Gregory S. Paul renamed (as an informal name) Magnosaurus into Streptospondylus nethercombensis.

In 2022, theropod specimens from the same locality as the type of Streptospondylus, long held in private collections, were described. It was found that some dorsal vertebrae (MNHN.F.RJN472;B5) bore autapomorphies of Streptospondylus, while a cervical vertebra (MPV 2020.1.11), a tibia (MPV 2020.1.2) and a femur were referred to the species, based on shared characters with the related genus Eustreptospondylus.

== Phylogeny ==
Earlier Streptospondylus assigned to crocodilian groups, in 19th century, in 20th century typically classified in the Megalosauridae.

Recent analyses indicate that Streptospondylus is a tetanuran theropod. Allain in 2001 suggested that it was closely related to Eustreptospondylus in the Spinosauroidea. Roger Benson in 2008 and 2010 concluded that whether it is a megalosauroid, allosauroid, or a more primitive form cannot be determined because of its extremely fragmentary remains. Later cladistic analysis by Benson and colleagues from 2010 indicated that Streptospondylus was the sister species of Magnosaurus within the Megalosauridae. Carrano et al. (2012) placed Streptospondylus at Megalosauria incertae sedis due to its fragmentary nature.

- Megalosauroidea
  - Piatnitzkysauridae
  - Megalosauria
    - Streptospondylus
    - Spinosauridae
    - Megalosauridae
      - Eustreptospondylinae
        - Eustreptospondylus
      - - Megalosaurinae
          - Duriavenator
          - - Megalosaurus
            - Torvosaurus
        - Afrovenatorinae
          - Afrovenator
          - - Dubreuillosaurus
            - Magnosaurus
          - - Leshansaurus
            - Piveteausaurus
