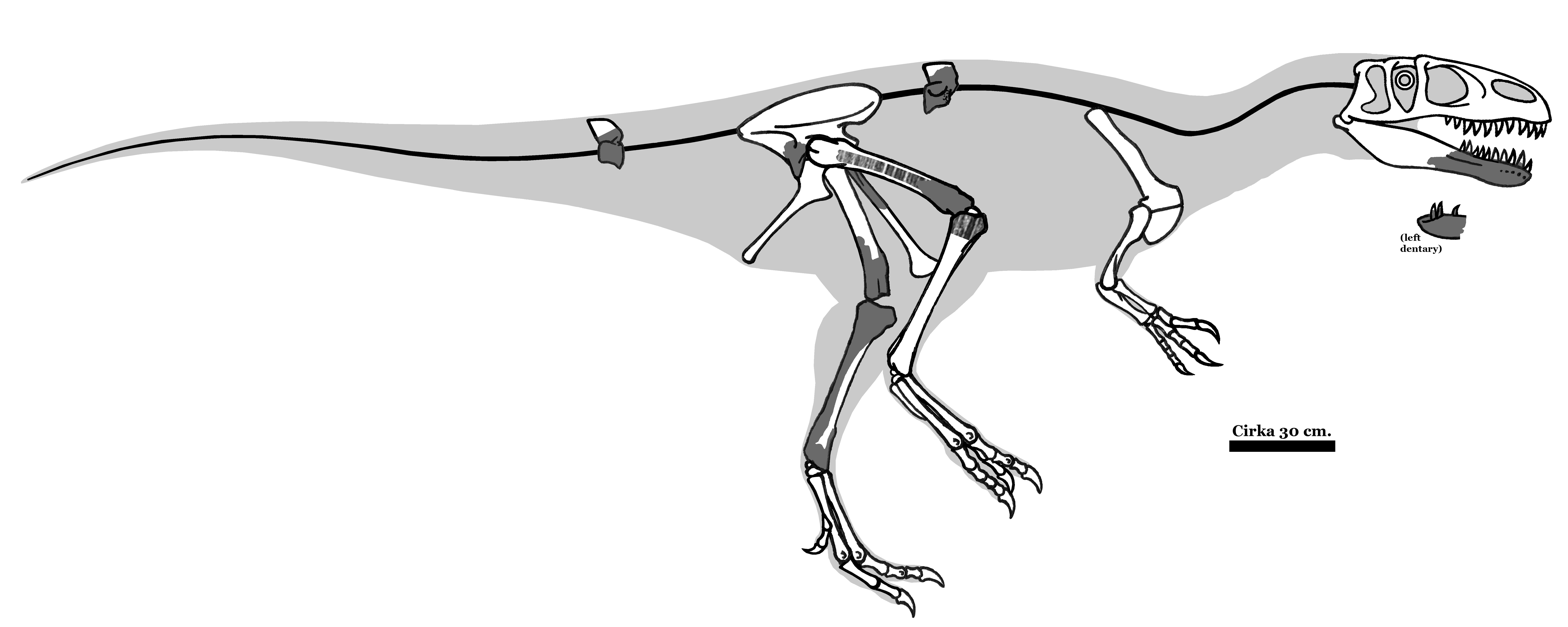
- Skeletal diagram of the holotype specimen

Scientific classification
- Kingdom: Animalia
- Phylum: Chordata
- Class: Reptilia
- Clade: Dinosauria
- Clade: Saurischia
- Clade: Theropoda
- Family: †Megalosauridae
- Subfamily: †Afrovenatorinae
- Genus: †Magnosaurus; Huene, 1932

Type species
- †Megalosaurus nethercombensis Huene, 1923

Species
- †M. nethercombensis (Huene, 1923 [originally Megalosaurus])

= Magnosaurus =

Magnosaurus Temporal range: Bajocian, ~170–168 Ma

Extinct genus of dinosaurs

Magnosaurus (meaning 'large lizard') was a genus of theropod dinosaur from the Middle Jurassic of England. It is based on fragmentary remains and has often been confused with or included in Megalosaurus.

== History and taxonomy ==
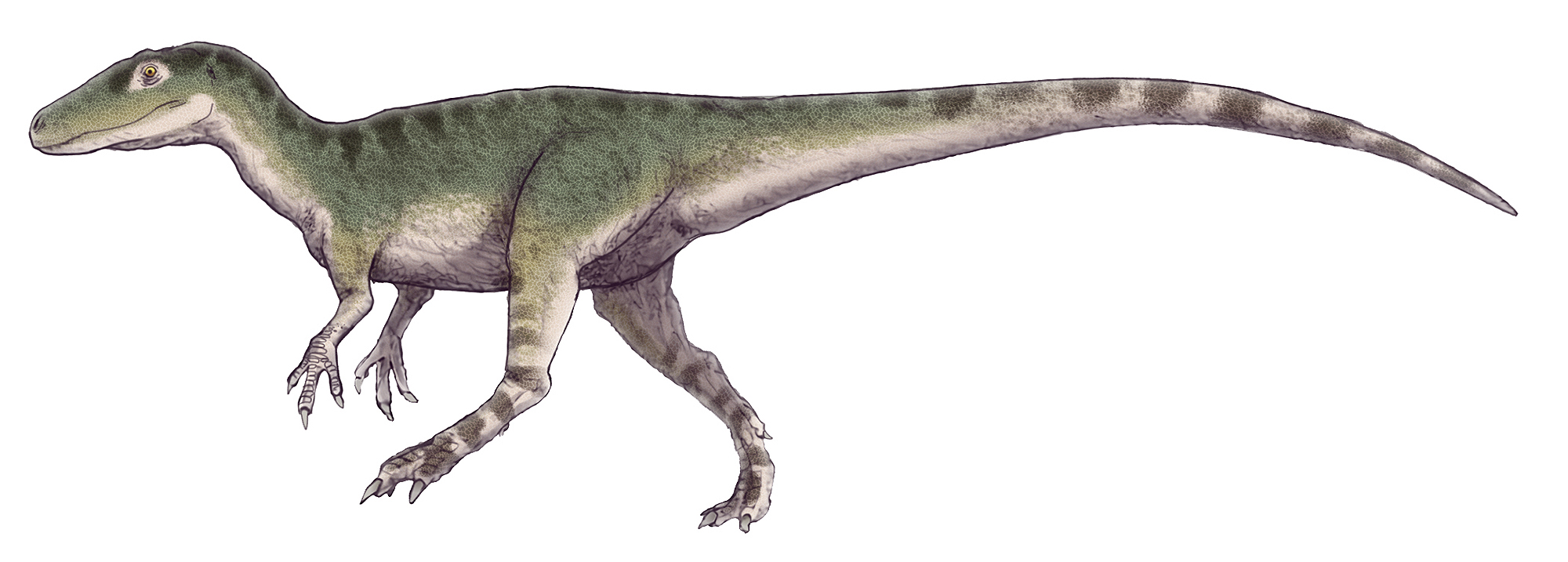
Speculative life restoration

In 1923, Friedrich von Huene named Megalosaurus nethercombensis from a partial skeleton (OUM J12143) from the Bajocian age Middle Jurassic Inferior Oolite, found in the nineteenth century by W. Parker near Nethercomb, north of Sherborne, in Dorset, England. The material included partial dentaries, dorsal and caudal vertebrae, a partial ilium, a partial right pubis, internal casts of the femora, and tibiae, from a possible juvenile individual. Huene interpreted it as a more primitive species of Megalosaurus.

In 1926, he named the tooth species Megalosaurus lydekkeri for a specimen, BMNH 41352, from the Lower Lias (Lower Jurassic) of England that Richard Lydekker had first described in 1888. Finally, in 1932, he created the genus Magnosaurus for M. nethercombensis, referred M. lydekkeri to it, and created a third species, M. woodwardi, for the genus. M. woodwardi was based on a tibia (BMNH R.3542) from the Lower Lias, which he simultaneously and accidentally also named Sarcosaurus andrewsi; in 1956 the latter name was given priority by von Huene. Even more confusing, in the same 1932 publication von Huene renamed Sarcosaurus woodi into Magnosaurus woodi.

Until the 1990s, the genus had been ignored as a species of Megalosaurus. However, with growing concern over what exactly is constituted by Megalosaurus, Magnosaurus has been generally separated as its own genus. Also, there are morphological differences: for example, possible Megalosaurus tibiae are compressed at the far end, unlike those of Magnosaurus. Rauhut (2003) considered it and Eustreptospondylus to be the same genus, because the two share a similarly expanded front tip of the dentary and enlarged third dentary tooth. He therefore renamed Eustreptospondylus oxoniensis a Magnosaurus oxoniensis but this has not been generally followed. Reviews have found it to most likely be a basal tetanuran, probably a megalosaurid. A detailed redescription by Roger Benson in 2010 concluded Magnosaurus was valid taxon, a megalosaurid megalosauroid, and at about 175 million years old the oldest certain known member of the Tetanurae.

=== Species ===
Magnosaurus is known from many species, most of were originally named as a different genus.

- Magnosaurus nethercombensis (Huene, 1923) Huene, 1932 = Megalosaurus nethercombensis Huene, 1923
- Magnosaurus lydekkeri (Huene, 1926) Huene, 1932 (nomen dubium) = Megalosaurus lydekkeri Huene, 1926
- Magnosaurus woodwardi Huene, 1932 (nomen dubium) = Sarcosaurus andrewsi Huene, 1932 = Megalosaurus woodwardi (Huene, 1932)

The type species of Eustreptospondylus, Megalosaurus and Sarcosaurus are also sometimes assigned to Magnosaurus. In such cases the combinations are:

- Magnosaurus woodi (Andrews, 1921) = Sarcosaurus woodi Andrews, 1921
- Magnosaurus oxoniensis (Walker, 1964) Rahut, 2003 = Eustreptospondylus oxoniensis Walker, 1964
- Magnosaurus bucklandi (Meyer, 1832) Weishampel et al., 2004 = lapsus calami, Megalosaurus bucklandi Meyer, 1832 = Megalosaurus bucklandii Mantell, 1827

== Description ==
Size of Magnosaurus (in green) compared to two other afrovenatorines

Because the remains are sparse and fragmentary, most details about its anatomical features are unknown. It would have been a bipedal carnivore of moderate size for a dinosaur. The most similar animals to it would probably be Eustreptospondylus, Dubreuillosaurus, and Afrovenator. Paul (1988) roughly estimated the mass of the type individual as around 175 kg (386 lb), which would correspond to a length of roughly 4 m (13 ft), judging by his estimates for the sizes of other theropods. Benson however, in 2010 gave a higher estimation of about half a tonne; the animal would have stood at over a metre at the hip.

== Classification ==
The phylogenetic position of Magnosaurus according to Carrano et al. (2012) is shown by this cladogram:

- Megalosauroidea
  - Piatnitzkysauridae
  - Megalosauria
    - Streptospondylus
    - Spinosauridae
    - Megalosauridae
      - Eustreptospondylinae
        - Eustreptospondylus
      - - Megalosaurinae
          - Duriavenator
          - - Megalosaurus
            - Torvosaurus
        - Afrovenatorinae
          - Afrovenator
          - - Dubreuillosaurus
            - Magnosaurus
          - - Leshansaurus
            - Piveteausaurus
