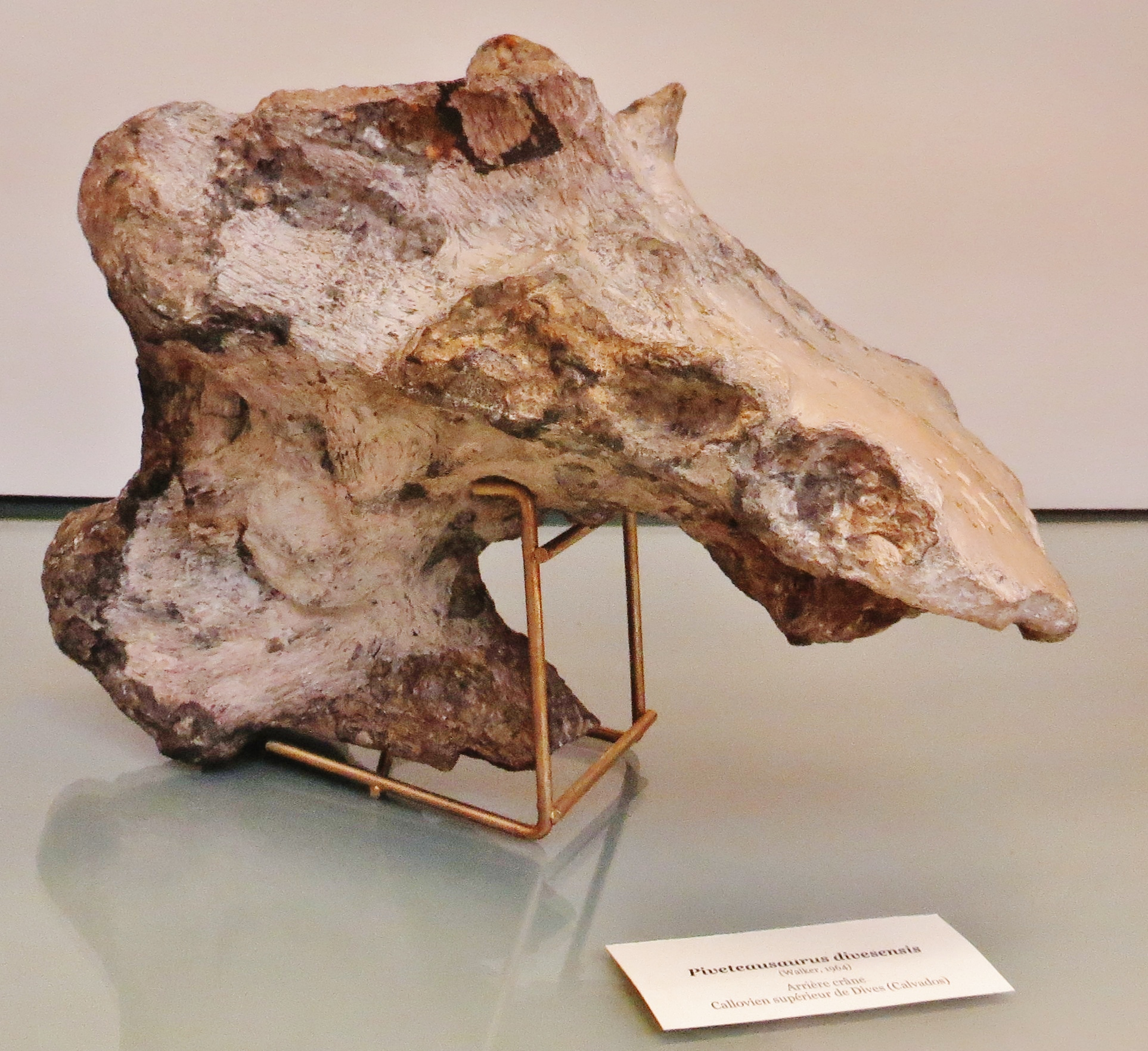
- Holotype

Scientific classification
- Kingdom: Animalia
- Phylum: Chordata
- Class: Reptilia
- Clade: Dinosauria
- Clade: Saurischia
- Clade: Theropoda
- Family: †Megalosauridae
- Genus: †Piveteausaurus; Taquet & Welles, 1977
- Species: †P. divesensis

Binomial name
- †Piveteausaurus divesensis (Walker, 1964 [originally Eustreptospondylus])

Synonyms
- Eustreptospondylus divesensis Walker, 1964; Proceratosaurus divesensis Paul, 1988 comb. nov.

= Piveteausaurus =

Piveteausaurus Temporal range: Middle - Late Jurassic, 164.7–161.2 Ma

Extinct genus of dinosaurs

Piveteausaurus (meaning "Jean Piveteau's lizard") is a genus of theropod dinosaur known from a partial skull discovered in the Middle Jurassic (164.7 to 161.2 million years ago) Marnes de Dives of Calvados, northern France. In 2012, Thomas Holtz gave a possible length of 11 metres (36 ft).

== History and description ==
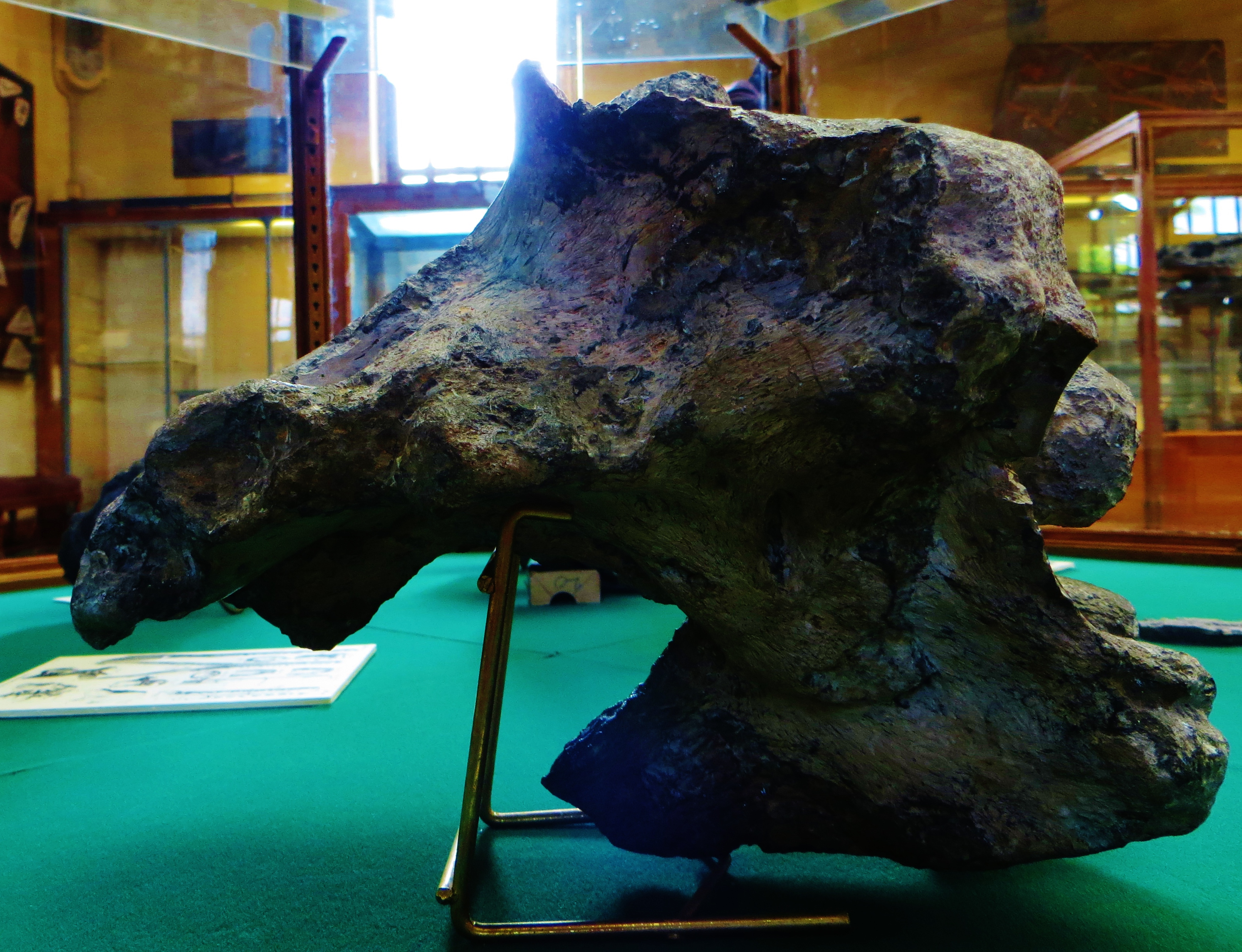
Holotype

The partial braincase that became the type specimen of Piveteausaurus was first described in 1923 by French paleontologist Jean Piveteau in illustrations and photographs of the specimen (MNHN 1920-7). The braincase is comparable in size to that of a large Allosaurus, and resembles that of another megalosauroid, Piatnitzkysaurus from Argentina. Piveteau grouped this partial skull with other specimens found earlier in that locality and described in 1808 by French naturalist Georges Cuvier. In 1861 English paleontologist Richard Owen assigned the fragments to the species Streptospondylus cuvieri, and Piveteau included the skull he found in the same species.

MNHN 1920-7 was found by local collector Dutacq in rocks thought to be Oxfordian (Upper Jurassic), of the Marnes de Dives around the Vaches Noires cliffs near Dives in Normandy, France, and was after being reported by amateur geologist Cazenave in 1920 acquired by Professor Marcellin Boule for the Muséum national d'histoire naturelle. Later these rocks were reevaluated as older (Upper Callovian, Middle Jurassic, ~164 million years old).

MNHN 1920-7 was reevaluated in 1964 by Alick Walker as part of his work on Ornithosuchus and the evolution of the Carnosauria. He assigned MNHN 1920-7 to Eustreptospondylus as the holotype, or type specimen, of the new species E. divesensis. The other bone fragments described by Cuvier and attributed to S. cuvieri by Owen were also transferred, as a "matter of convenience," but without conviction on the part of Walker, to the new species, E. divesensis. It was given its own genus in 1977 by Philippe Taquet and Samuel Welles: Piveteausaurus, named after Piveteau. Taquet and Welles removed the postcranial bones, conveniently associated with the skull by Walker, from the species. In 1988 Gregory S. Paul synonymised Piveteausaurus with Proceratosaurus coining the new combination Proceratosaurus divesensis, but this assignment was rejected by other researchers.

While the braincase appears to be distinct, the limited remains mean Piveteausaurus has not been easy to classify. It has been compared to Ceratosaurus, Eustreptospondylus, and Proceratosaurus, and was interpreted as a species of the latter two genera at various times.

== Classification ==
Piveteausaurus was originally regarded as a megalosaurid as a "matter of convenience", as its describers did not want to name a new family for such fragmentary remains. Tom Holtz and colleagues (2004) considered it to be an indeterminate member of Tetanurae, though they did not include it in a phylogenetic analysis.

The first such analysis was performed by Benson in 2010. He found that while its exact placement was unresolved, it always grouped with a member of the clade Megalosauridae, and so most likely belonged to that family.

The phylogenetic position of Piveteausaurus according to Carrano et al. (2012) is shown by this cladogram:

- Megalosauroidea
  - Piatnitzkysauridae
  - Megalosauria
    - Streptospondylus
    - Spinosauridae
    - Megalosauridae
      - Eustreptospondylinae
        - Eustreptospondylus
      - - Megalosaurinae
          - Duriavenator
          - - Megalosaurus
            - Torvosaurus
        - Afrovenatorinae
          - Afrovenator
          - - Dubreuillosaurus
            - Magnosaurus
          - - Leshansaurus
            - Piveteausaurus

== Sources ==
- Glut, Donald F. (1997). "Piveteausaurus". Dinosaurs: The Encyclopedia. Jefferson, North Carolina: McFarland & Co. pp. 706–707. ISBN 0-89950-917-7.
