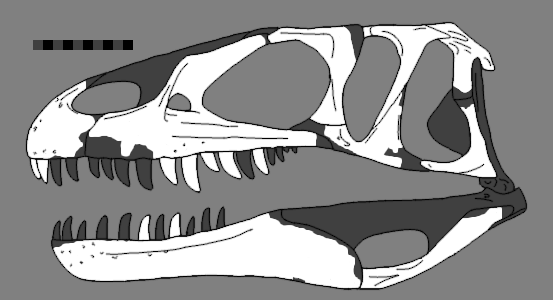
- Reconstructed skull

Scientific classification
- Kingdom: Animalia
- Phylum: Chordata
- Class: Reptilia
- Clade: Dinosauria
- Clade: Saurischia
- Clade: Theropoda
- Family: †Megalosauridae
- Genus: †Dubreuillosaurus; Allain, 2005
- Species: †D. valesdunensis

Binomial name
- †Dubreuillosaurus valesdunensis (Allain, 2002 [originally Poekilopleuron])

Synonyms
- Calvadosaurus Holtz, 2007; Poekilopleuron? valesdunensis Allain, 2002 (type)

= Dubreuillosaurus =

Dubreuillosaurus Temporal range: Middle Jurassic, 168–166 Ma

Extinct genus of dinosaurs

Dubreuillosaurus is a genus of carnivorous megalosaurid theropod dinosaur from the middle Jurassic Period. Its fossils were found in France. The only named species, Dubreuillosaurus valesdunensis, was originally described as a species of Poekilopleuron, Poekilopleuron? valesdunensis, which is still formally the type species of the genus. It was later renamed Dubreuillosaurus valesdunensis when, in 2005, Allain came to the conclusion that it was not part of the genus Poekilopleuron. Its type specimen, MNHN 1998-13, is only rivalled in the number of preserved elements in this group by that of Eustreptospondylus. Dubreuillosaurus is considered to be a sister taxon of Magnosaurus. It did not show signs of insular dwarfism even though it was uncovered on an island.

== Discovery and naming ==
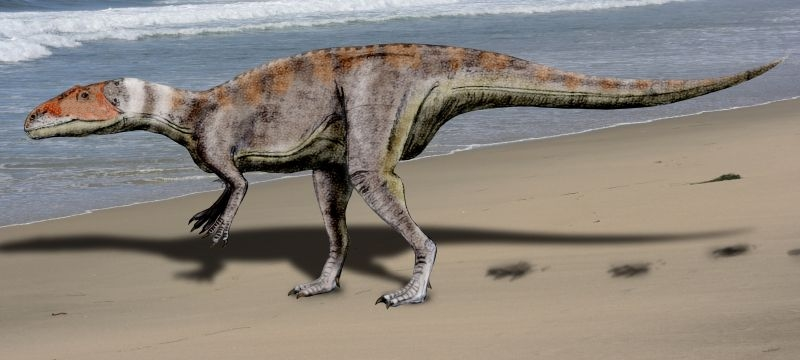
Life restoration

In 1994, the mayor of Conteville in Normandy, André Dubreuil, noted that during land rehabilitation of the old quarry of Pierre de Caen, dinosaur bones had surfaced. He secured a partial skull and some ribs and notified the Paris Muséum national d'Histoire naturelle. However, professional excavations only started in 1998 when the rock of the collapsed quarry face had already been spread by a bulldozer over a considerable surface. It proved necessary to dig up and sieve many cubic metres of rubble over several years, ultimately salvaging about two thousand bone fragments, varying in size between one and ten centimetres. From these scraps a more complete skeleton had to be reassembled.

In 2002, when this process had not yet been completed, Ronan Allain, after having dedicated a thesis to it, named the find as a new species of Poekilopleuron: Poekilopleuron? valesdunensis. The specific name referred to the nearby ancient battlefield of the Battle of Val-ès-Dunes, where William the Conqueror had in 1046 defeated his enemies. The naming paper also contained a description of the skull. The question mark after the generic name already indicated the assignment to Poekilopleuron was tentative. By 2005, Allain had come to the conclusion that the new species was not part of Poekilopleuron. He therefore created the new genus name Dubreuillosaurus for this species, the name honouring the Dubreuil family. The type species of the genus is the original Poekilopleuron valesdunensis, the combinatio nova is Dubreuillosaurus valesdunensis. The 2005 paper also contained a description of the postcranial skeleton.

The holotype, MNHN 1998-13, has been uncovered in a layer of the Calcaire de Caen dating from the middle Bathonian. It consists of a fragmentary skeleton with skull. Preserved parts include: the majority of the skull; the splenial and angular of the lower jaw, a natural mold of the surangular, two cervical vertebrae, cervical ribs, seven dorsals, ribs, gastralia, three sacrals, ten caudals, a chevron, a piece of the scapula, a claw of the hand, a partial thighbone, the upper part of a shinbone, a partial fibula, a fifth metatarsal and the first phalanx of the third toe. Considering the incompleteness of most other megalosaurids, this genus is exceptional in having a significant percentage of the skeleton been found. The type specimen of Dubreuillosaurus is in the number of preserved elements only rivalled in this group by that of Eustreptospondylus. The holotype represents a subadult individual. In October 2026, the holotype was put up for auction with an estimated cost of 250,000-350,000 Euros. This was met with criticism from the paleontology community, which included the creation of a petition to stop the fossils from being sold. In early November 2026, Minister of Culture Catherine Pégard and Minister of Higher Education, Research, Science and Technology Philippe Baptiste announced the state’s acquisition of the fossil remains on behalf of the National Museum of Natural History.

== Description ==
D. valesdunensis (yellow) in size compared to two other afrovenatorines

Dubreuillosaurus was physically comparable to Eustreptospondylus. The holotype was an individual by Gregory S. Paul estimated to measure 5 metres (16 ft) long and to weigh 250 kilograms (550 lb). However, this was a subadult; the adult length is uncertain, though it has been indicated as high as 9 metres (30 ft).

In 2005, Allain established some distinctive traits. Dubreuillosaurus has an unusually low and long skull, with a length three times the height. In the upper corner of the front edge of the nasal branch of the maxilla, a kink is present, separating a convex curvature below from a concave curvature above. The descending branch of the postorbital has a U-shaped cross-section. The parietal bones are not visible in side view. The supratemporal fenestra has a straight inner edge. A paraquadratic fenestra is lacking. A well-developed process is present on the underside of the jugal branch of the ectopterygoid. The rear edge of the jugal branch of the ectopterygoid, in front of the infratemporal fenestra, is deeply grooved. The lower jaw has a large external mandibular fenestra. The foramen mylohyoideum is largely oriented to the front and below. The head of the thighbone is directed to the inside and below. The front underside of the thighbone has a concave surface. In 2012 Matthew Carrano added one autapomorphy: on the rear of the braincase there is a notch between the basioccipital and the bone surface formed by the exoccipitals and the opisthotic.

Dubreuillosaurus seemed to lack any sort of crest or horns, but the only known specimen is a juvenile, and it is possible that these structures developed in later life. Like its relatives, Dubreuillosaurus probably had short, powerful arms with three-fingered hands.

== Phylogeny ==
In 2002, Poekilopleuron? valesdunensis was assigned to the Megalosauridae. In 2012, Carrano et al. refined this to the Afrovenatorinae, in which it would be the sister species of Magnosaurus within the clade.

The phylogenetic position of Dubreuillosaurus according to Carrano et al. is shown by this cladogram:

- Megalosauroidea
  - Piatnitzkysauridae
  - Megalosauria
    - Streptospondylus
    - Spinosauridae
    - Megalosauridae
      - Eustreptospondylinae
        - Eustreptospondylus
      - - Megalosaurinae
          - Duriavenator
          - - Megalosaurus
            - Torvosaurus
        - Afrovenatorinae
          - Afrovenator
          - - Dubreuillosaurus
            - Magnosaurus
          - - Leshansaurus
            - Piveteausaurus

Cau (2024) called the diagnosis of Dubreuillosaurus into question, considering it a junior synonym of the contemporary Poekilopleuron, attributing the skeletal differences as positional and individual variation, as seen in Allosaurus. Thus, Dubreuillosaurus would represent a less mature individual than Poekilopleuron.

== Paleobiology ==
During the Middle Jurassic much of Europe consisted of a number of islands. The fossil of Dubreuillosaurus was discovered in sedimentary rocks that were laid down in coastal, mangrove swamps at the east coast of the Armorican Massif. This suggests that it might have hunted fish and other marine prey. Allain in 2002 described P? valesdunensis as a fish eater or piscivore but this was influenced by the fact that the holotype of Poekilopleuron bucklandii had been found together with fish remains. Though uncovered at an island Dubreuillosaurus did not show the effects of insular dwarfism; like with Eustreptospondylus its small size is due to its being a subadult.
