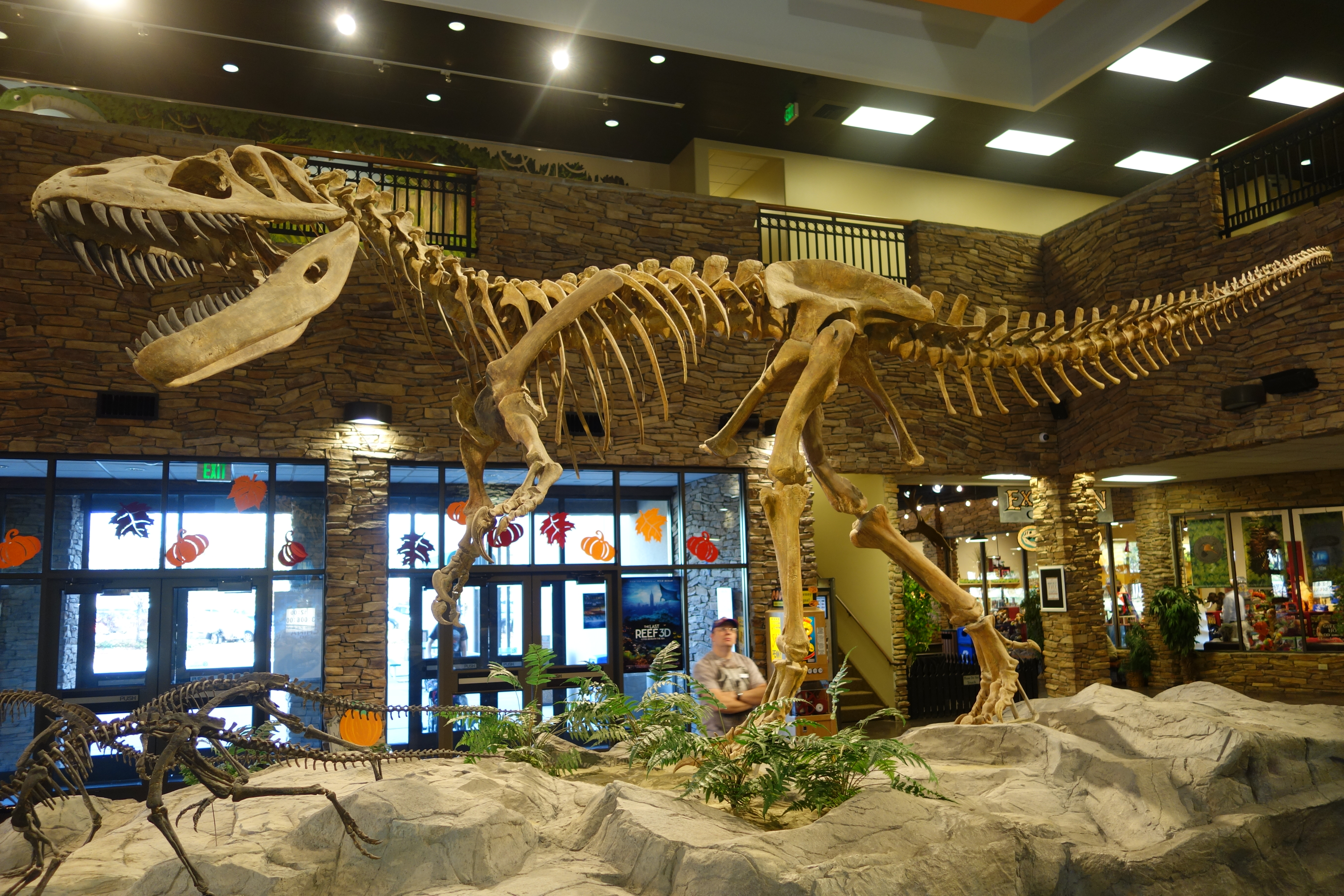
- Skeletal mount of Torvosaurus tanneri, Museum of Ancient Life

Scientific classification
- Kingdom: Animalia
- Phylum: Chordata
- Class: Reptilia
- Clade: Dinosauria
- Clade: Saurischia
- Clade: Theropoda
- Clade: †Megalosauria
- Family: †Megalosauridae; Huxley, 1869

Type species
- †Megalosaurus bucklandii Mantell, 1827

Subgroups
- †Piveteausaurus; †Poekilopleuron?; †Streptospondylus; †Yunyangosaurus?; †Megalosaurinae; †Duriavenator; †Megalosaurus; †Torvosaurus; †Wiehenvenator; †Eustreptospondylinae; †Eustreptospondylus; †Afrovenatorinae; †Afrovenator; †Dubreuillosaurus; †Leshansaurus; †Magnosaurus; †Streptospondylus?

Synonyms
- Torvosauridae Jensen, 1985; Eustreptospondylidae Paul, 1988; Streptospondylidae Kurzanov 1989

= Megalosauridae =

Megalosaurids Temporal range: Middle – Late Jurassic, 170–145 Ma Possible Berriasian-Valanginian record

Extinct family of dinosaurs

Megalosauridae is a monophyletic family of carnivorous theropod dinosaurs within the group Megalosauroidea. Appearing in the Middle Jurassic, megalosaurids were among the first major radiation of large theropod dinosaurs. They were a relatively primitive group of basal tetanurans containing two main subfamilies, Megalosaurinae and Afrovenatorinae, along with the basal genus Eustreptospondylus, an unresolved taxon which differs from both subfamilies.

The defining megalosaurid, Megalosaurus bucklandii, was first named and described in 1824 by William Buckland after multiple finds in Stonesfield, Oxfordshire, UK. Megalosaurus was the first formally described dinosaur and was the basis for the establishment of the clade Dinosauria. It is also one of the largest known Middle Jurassic carnivorous dinosaurs, with the best-preserved femur at 805 mm and a proposed body mass of around 943 kg. Megalosauridae has mainly been recognized as a European group of dinosaurs, based on fossils found in France and the UK, but fossils show that the group is also found in North America, Africa, South America and possibly Asia.

The family Megalosauridae was first defined by Thomas Huxley in 1869, yet it has been contested throughout history due to its role as a "waste-basket" for many partially described dinosaurs or unidentified remains. In the early years of paleontology, most large theropods were grouped together and up to 48 species were included in the clade Megalosauria, the basal clade of Megalosauridae. Over time, most of these taxa were placed in other clades and the parameters of Megalosauridae were narrowed significantly. However, some controversy remains over whether Megalosauridae should be considered its own distinct group, and dinosaurs in this family remain some of the most problematic taxa in all Dinosauria. Some paleontologists, such as Paul Sereno in 2005, have disregarded the group due to its shaky foundation and lack of clarified phylogeny. However, recent research by Carrano, Benson, and Sampson has systematically analyzed all basal tetanurans and determined that Megalosauridae should exist as its own family. They have been generally closely related to the family Spinosauridae.

== Description ==
=== Body size ===
Scale comparison of 3 afrovenatorines

Size comparison of the two species of Torvosaurus, among the largest megalosaurids

Like other tetanurans, megalosaurids are carnivorous theropods characterized by large size and bipedalism. Specifically, megalosaurids exhibit especially giant size, with some members of the family weighing more than one tonne. Over time, there is evidence of size increase within the family. Basal megalosaurids from the Early Jurassic had smaller body size than those appearing in the late Middle Jurassic. Due to this size increase over time, Megalosauridae appear to follow a size increase pattern similar to that of other giant sized theropods like Spinosauridae. This pattern follows Cope's rule, the postulation by paleontologist Edward Cope about evolutionary increase in body size.

=== Anatomical characteristics ===
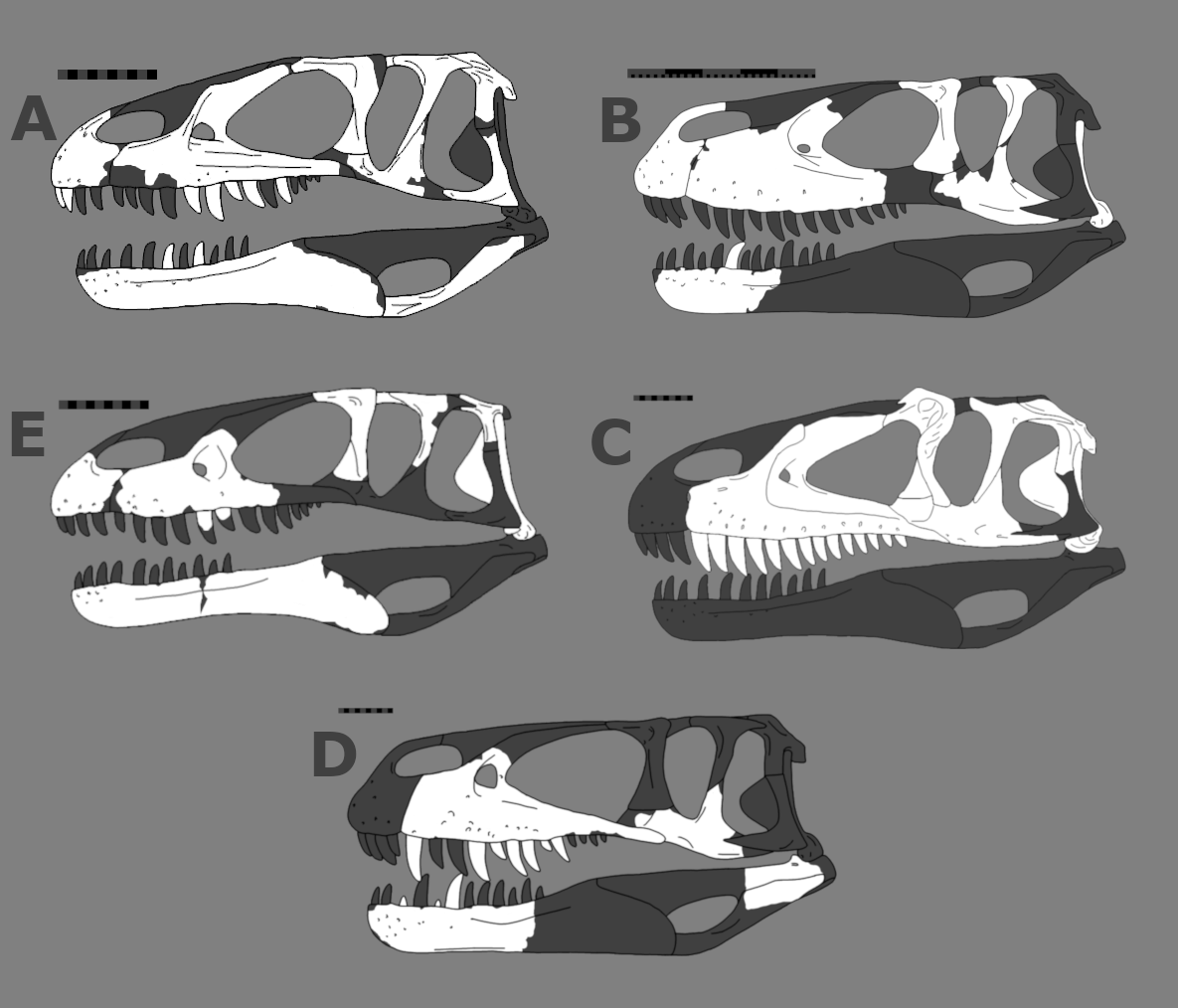
Megalosaurid skulls. Clockwise from top left: Dubreuillosaurus, Torvosaurus, Afrovenator, Megalosaurus, Eustreptospondylus

One unambiguous synapomorphy of Megalosauridae is a lower and longer skull with a length to height ratio of 3:1. In addition, the typical skull roof tends to be much less ornamented than that of other tetanurans, and crests or horns are either very small or absent entirely. Megalosaurids also have femoral heads with an orientation 45 degrees between anteromedial and fully medial. Megalosauridae are also defined by the following unique unambiguous synapomorphies:

- A humeral deltopectoral crest that terminates about halfway along the humeral shaft
- The absence of a fibular anterolateral tubercle.
- Nares which extend as far as the premaxillary teeth, yet the portion of the premaxilla anterior to the nares being longer than the portion under them; angled snout tip (angle between the anterior and alveolar margins <70 degrees).
- Medial foramina on the quadrate adjacent to the mandibular condyles.
- Pleurocoelous fossae on the sacral vertebrae.
- The oblique ligament groove on the posterior surface of the femoral head is shallow.

Megalosaurinae (all megalosaurids more closely related to Megalosaurus than Afrovenator) are characterized by a moderate (0.5–2.0) height/length ratio of the premaxilla below the level of the nares, compared to other megalosaurids which have a lower ratio and thus less tall snout tip.

Afrovenatorinae (all megalosaurids more closely related to Afrovenator than Megalosaurus) are characterized by a squared anterior margin of the antorbital fossa and the puboischiadic plate being broadly open along the midline.

=== Dental morphology ===
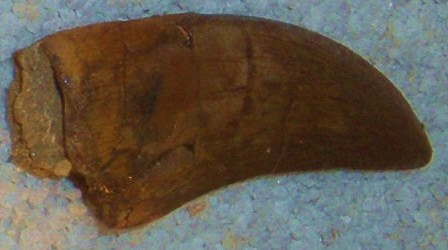
Tooth from Megalosaurus

Dental findings are frequently used to differentiate between various theropods and to further inform cladistic phylogeny. Tooth morphology and dental evolutionary markers are prone to homoplasy and disappear or reappear throughout history. However, megalosaurids have several specific denture conditions that differentiate them from other basal theropods. One dental condition present in Megalosauridae is multiple enamel wrinkles near the carinae, the sharp edge or serration row of the tooth. Ornamented teeth and a well-marked enamel surface also characterize basal megalosaurids. The ornamentation and well-marked surface appears in early megalosaurids but disappears in derived megalosaurids, suggesting that the condition was lost over time as megalosaurids grew in size.

== Classification ==
=== Historical classification ===
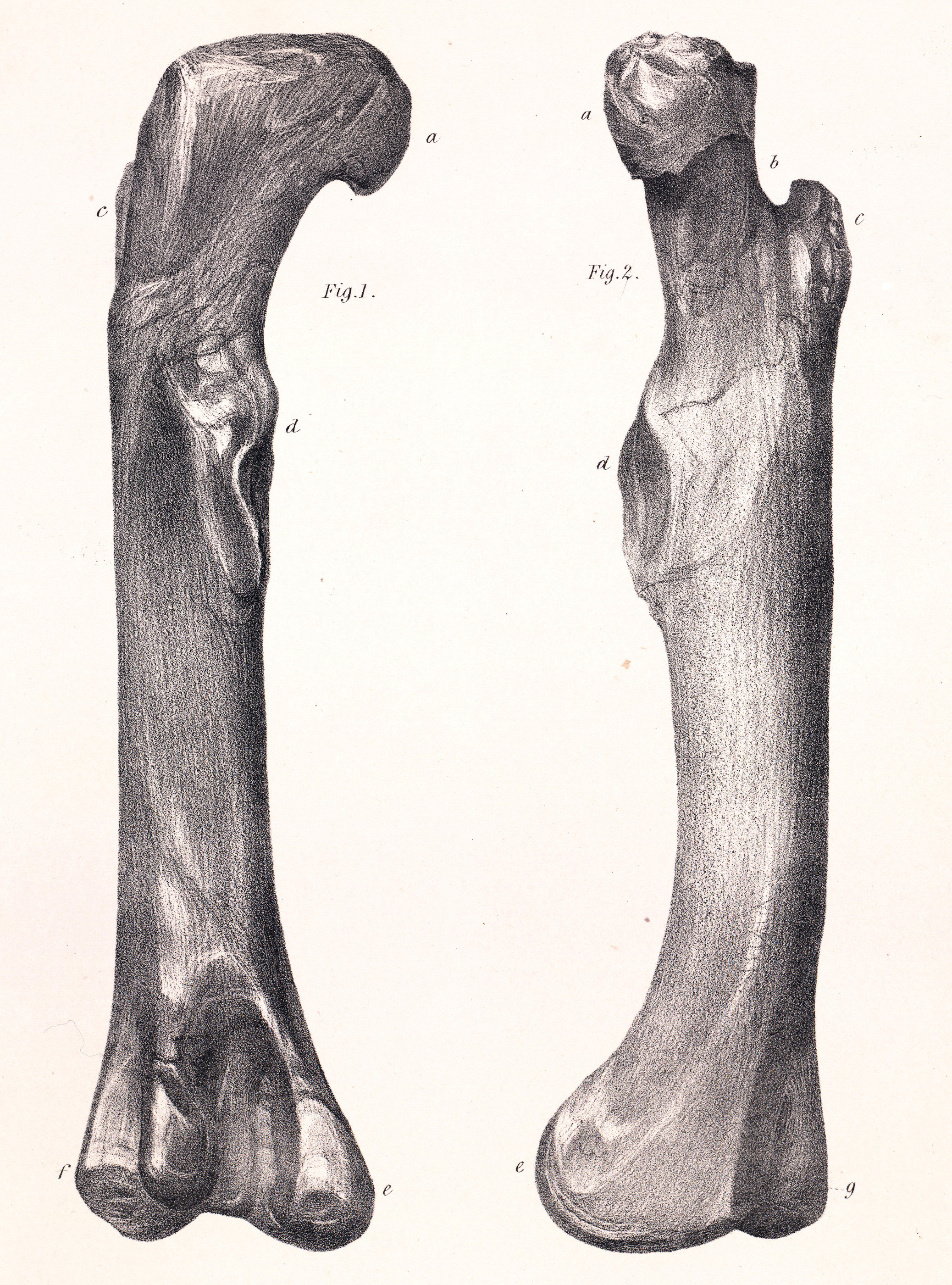
Megalosaurus femur

From the family's inception, many specimens found in the field have been wrongly classified as megalosaurids. For example, most large carnivores found for about a century after the naming of Megalosaurus bucklandii were placed in Megalosauridae. Megalosaurus was the first paleontological finding of its kind when William Buckland discovered a giant femur and named it in 1824, predating even the term Dinosauria. When initially defined, the species M. bucklandii was anatomically based on various dissociated bones found in quarries around the village of Stonesfield, UK. Some of these early findings included a right dentary with a well-preserved tooth, ribs, pelvic bones, and sacral vertebrae. As early paleontologists and researchers found more dinosaur bones in the surrounding area, they attributed them all to M. bucklandii since it was the only named and described dinosaur at this point in history. Therefore, the species was initially described and classified by a mass of possibly unrelated characteristics.

Modern paleontology first began to approach the problematic cladistic separation of Megalosauridae during the early 20th century. Fredrich von Huene separated carnivorous theropods, which had all been grouped into the broad category of megalosaurids, into two distinct families of larger, more giant sized and smaller, more lightly built theropods. These two groups were named Coelurosauria and Pachypodosauria respectively. Later on, Huene distinguished between carnivorous and herbivorous dinosaurs in Pachypodosauria, placing the meat-eaters in a new group Carnosauria.

As more information was uncovered about basal theropods and phylogenetic characteristics, modern paleontologists began to question the proper naming for this group. In 2005 paleontologist Paul Sereno rejected the use of the clade Megalosauridae due to its ambiguous early history in favor of the name Torvosauridae. Today, it is accepted that megalosaurids existed at least as a group of basal tetanurans, due to the fact that they have more derived taxa than ceratosaurs and that the name Megalosauridae should represent this group. Megalosauridae also has priority over Torvosauridae under ICZN rules governing family names.

=== Phylogeny ===
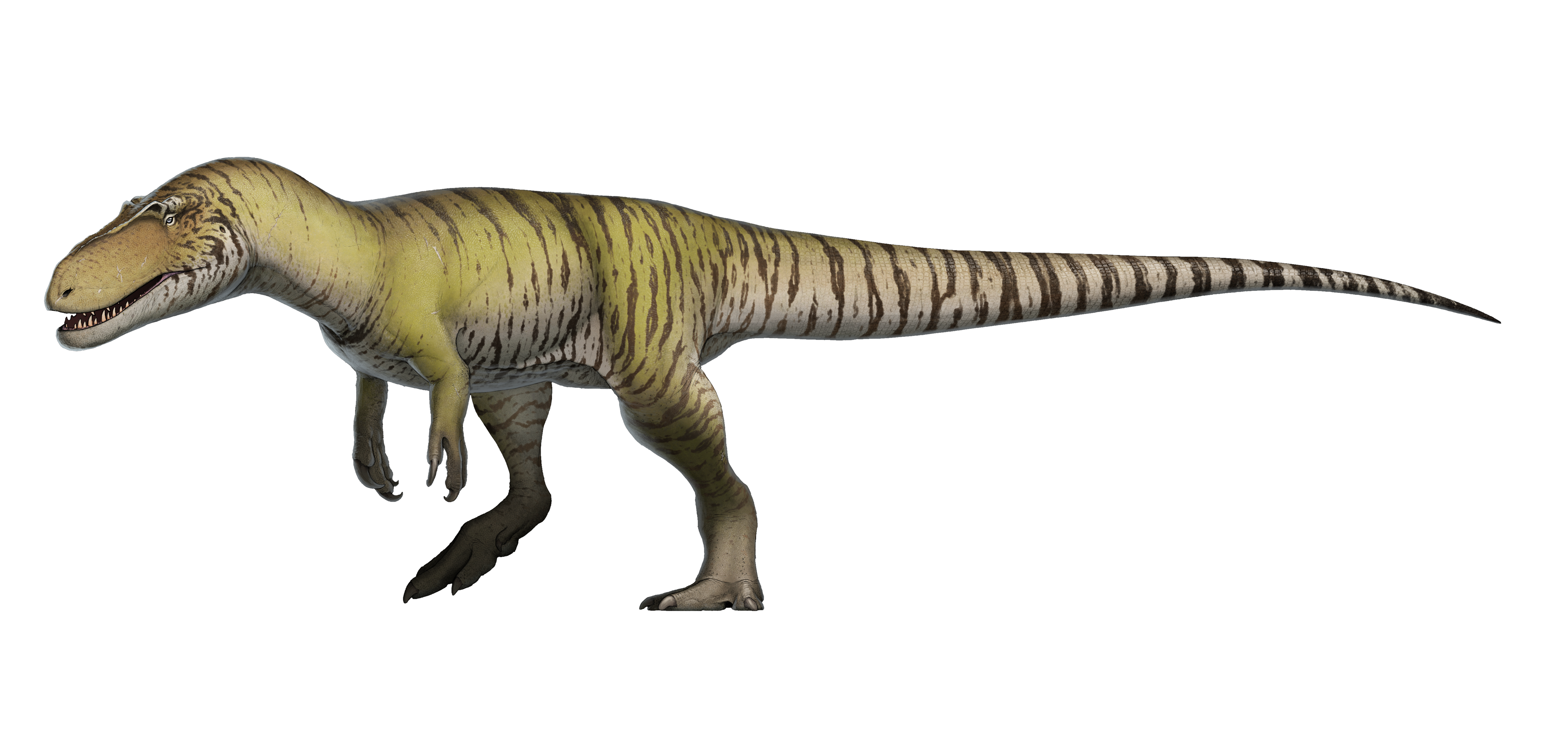
A reconstruction of Torvosaurus tanneri

Megalosauridae was first phylogenetically defined in 1869 by Thomas Huxley, yet was used as a 'waste-basket' clade for many years. In 2002, Ronan Allain redefined the clade after he discovered a complete megalosaurid skull in northwestern France of species Poekilopleuron. Using the characters described in this study, Allain defined Megalosauridae as dinosaurs including Poekilopleuron valesdunesis, now known as Dubreuillosaurus, Torvosaurus, Afrovenator, and all descendants of their common ancestor. Allain also defined two taxa within Megalosauridae: Torvosaurinae was defined as all Megalosauridae more closely related to Torvosaurus than to Poekilopleuron and Afrovenator, and Megalosaurinae was defined as all those that are more closely related to Poekilopleuron. Megalosauridae also falls under the basal clade Megalosauroidea, which also contains Spinosauridae. However, many taxa are still quite unstable and cannot be placed in one clade with absolute certainty. For example, Eustreptospondylus and Streptospondylus, while they are both defined as Megalosauridae, are often excluded to make more stable cladograms since they are not defined to a certain subgroup. The cladogram presented here follows Benson (2010) and Benson et al. (2010).

- Megalosauridae
  - Eustreptospondylinae
    - Eustreptospondylus
    - - Magnosaurus
      - Streptospondylus
  - Megalosaurinae
    - Duriavenator
    - - Afrovenator
      - Dubreuillosaurus
    - - Megalosaurus
      - Torvosaurus
      - Wiehenvenator

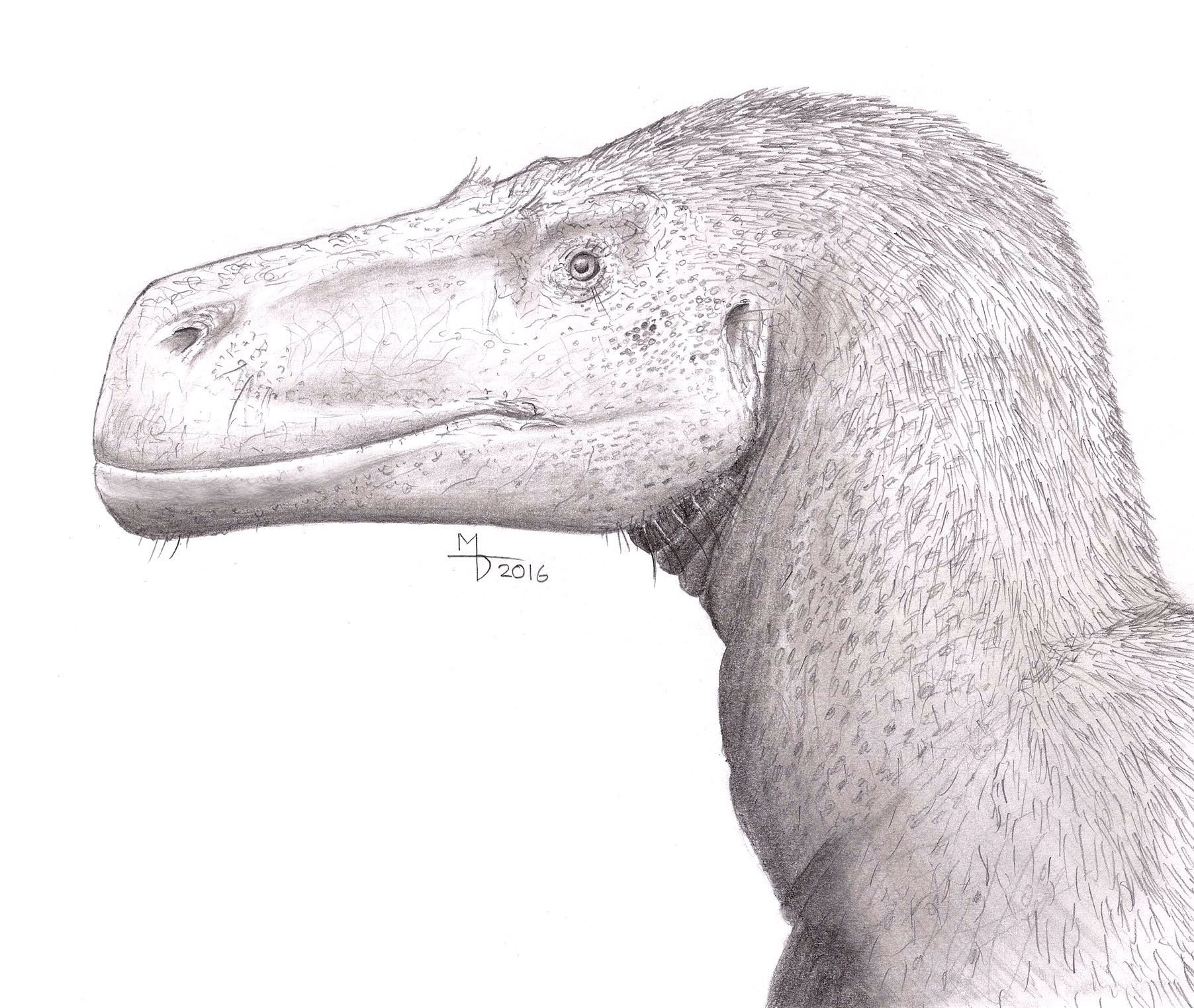
Wiehenvenator, a typical megalosaurine

Then, in 2012, Carrano, Benson, and Sampson did a much larger analysis of tetanurans and defined Megalosauria more broadly as the clade containing Megalosaurus, Spinosaurus, and all its descendants. In other words, Megalosauria is the group that contains the two families Megalosauridae and its close relative Spinosauridae. Within this new cladogram, Megalosauridae was given a new subfamily Afrovenatorinae, which included all megalosaurids more closely related to Afrovenator than Megalosaurus.

Carrano, Benson, and Sampson also included various megalosaurids that had previously been excluded from cladograms in their 2012 study, such as Duriavenator and Wiehenvenator in Megalosaurinae and Magnosaurus, Leshansaurus, and Piveteausaurus in Afrovenatorinae.

- Megalosauroidea
  - Piatnitzkysauridae
  - Megalosauria
    - Streptospondylus
    - Spinosauridae
    - Megalosauridae
      - Eustreptospondylinae
        - Eustreptospondylus
      - - Megalosaurinae
          - Duriavenator
          - - Megalosaurus
            - Torvosaurus
        - Afrovenatorinae
          - Afrovenator
          - - Dubreuillosaurus
            - Magnosaurus
          - - Leshansaurus
            - Piveteausaurus

Scuirumimus albersodoerferi, a small theropod described in 2012 which preserved protofeathers, was initially believed to be a juvenile megalosauroid. This led to the belief that megalosaurids may have had feathers. However, subsequent analyses have placed Sciurumimus as a basal coelurosaur, and several supposed megalosauroid synapomorphies reported in the original description are shared with basal coelurosaurs.

In 2016, Wiehenvenator was found by phylogenetic analysis to be in the Megalosauridae as a sister taxon to Torvosaurus. The following is a cladogram based on the phylogenetic analysis conducted by Rauhut et al., showing the relationships of Wiehenvenator.

- Megalosauridae
  - - - Eustreptospondylus
    - - Dubreuillosaurus
      - Magnosaurus
      - Afrovenator
      - Piveteausaurus
  - - - Duriavenator
      - - Megalosaurus
        - - Wiehenvenator
          - Torvosaurus

In 2019, Rauhut and Pol described Asfaltovenator vialidadi, a basal allosauroid displaying a mosaic of primitive and derived features seen within Tetanurae. Their phylogenetic analysis found traditional Megalosauroidea to represent a basal grade of carnosaurs, paraphyletic with respect to Allosauroidea. This would render Megalosauridae a family of carnosaurs.

- Carnosauria
  - Monolophosaurus
  - - Spinosauridae
    - - Megalosauridae
      - Allosauroidea
        - Xuanhanosaurus
        - - Piatnitzkysauridae
          - - Asfaltovenator
            - - Metriacanthosauridae
              - - Allosaurus
                - Carcharodontosauria

== Palaeoecology ==
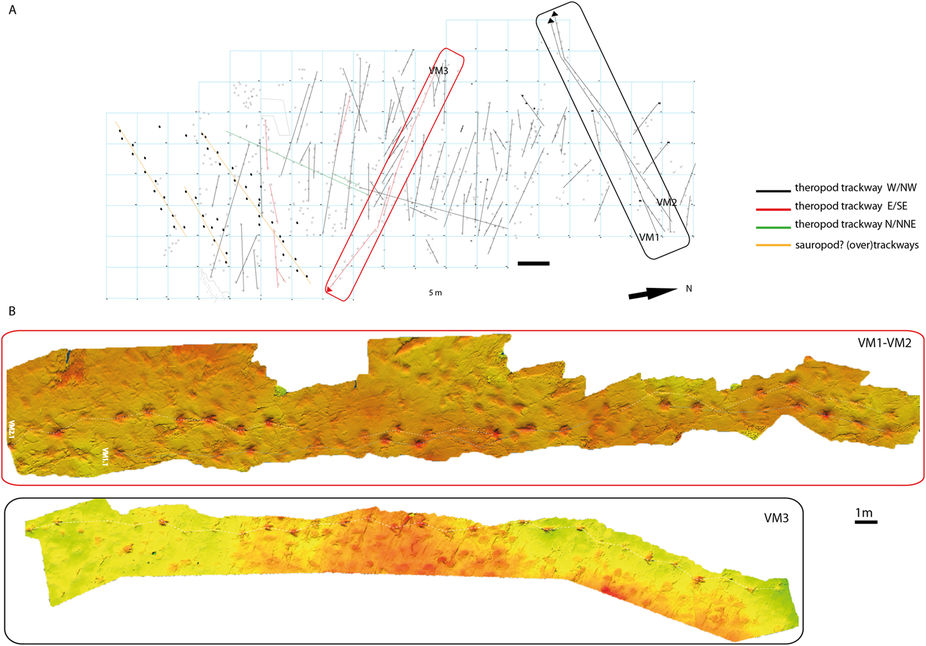
Megalosaurid trackways from Vale de Meios, Serras de Aire e Candeeiros Natural Park

Megalosaurids have been suggested to be predators or scavengers inhabiting coastal environments. Middle Jurassic-era tracks believed to have left by megalosaurids have been found at Vale de Meios in Portugal. During the middle Jurassic, this site would have been a tidal flat exposed at low tide on the edge of a lagoon. Unlike most coastal tracks, which are parallel to the coastline and probably left by migrating animals, the Vale de Meios tracks were perpendicular to the coast, with the vast majority oriented towards the lagoon. This indicates that the megalosaurids which would have left these tracks approached the tidal flat once the tide retreated.

This indicates that megalosaurids could have scavenged for the carcasses of marine creatures left by the receding tides. Another possibility is that megalosaurids were piscivorous, approaching the coast to hunt for fish. Spinosaurids, which were close relatives of megalosaurids, had numerous adaptations for piscivory and semiaquatic life, so such a lifestyle is supported by phylogenetic data. Shark teeth, cartilage fragments, and gastroliths have been documented as stomach contents in Poekilopleuron. Both this genus and Dubreuillosaurus were discovered in sediments also preserving mangrove roots, providing further evidence for a coastal habitat. Nevertheless, this does not rule out the possibility that megalosaurids also fed on terrestrial prey.

=== Palaeogeography ===
Pangea before the split into Gondwana and Laurasia

Species included in Megalosauridae have been found on every modern continent, split relatively equally between sites on the Gondwana and Laurasia supercontinents. Paleogeography findings show that Megalosauridae was mainly restricted to the Middle to Late Jurassic, suggesting they went extinct at the Jurassic-Cretaceous boundary 145 million years ago. Teeth from the Berriasian-Valanginian aged Bajada Colorada Formation in Argentina suggest that the group may have persisted into the Early Cretaceous in South America.

The global radiation of these carnivorous theropods occurred in two steps. First, radiation occurred during Pangaea's breakup during the Early Jurassic, about 200 million years ago. When the Tethys Sea emerged between the supercontinent, megalosauroids radiated to the two-halves of Pangaea. The second step of radiation occurred during the Middle and Late Jurassic, 174 to 145 million years ago, in allosauroids and coelurosaurs. Megalosauridae appears to have gone extinct at the end of this time period.

Megalosaurid remains have been found in various areas of the world throughout history. For example, Megalosauridae contains the most primitive theropod embryo ever found, from Early Tithonian Portugal 152 million years ago (mya). In addition, various megalosaurid fossil discoveries have been dated to Bajocian-Callovian England and France 168 to 163 mya, Middle Jurassic Africa about 170 mya, Late Jurassic China 163 to 145 mya, and Tithonian North America about 150 mya. Most recently, megalosaurids have been found in the Tiourarén Formation in Niger, proving again that these basal tetanurans have experienced global radiation. Teeth from the Late Jurassic aged Tacuarembó Formation of Uruguay and the Tendaguru Formation of Tanzania indicate the presence of a large megalosaurine, likely Torvosaurus.
