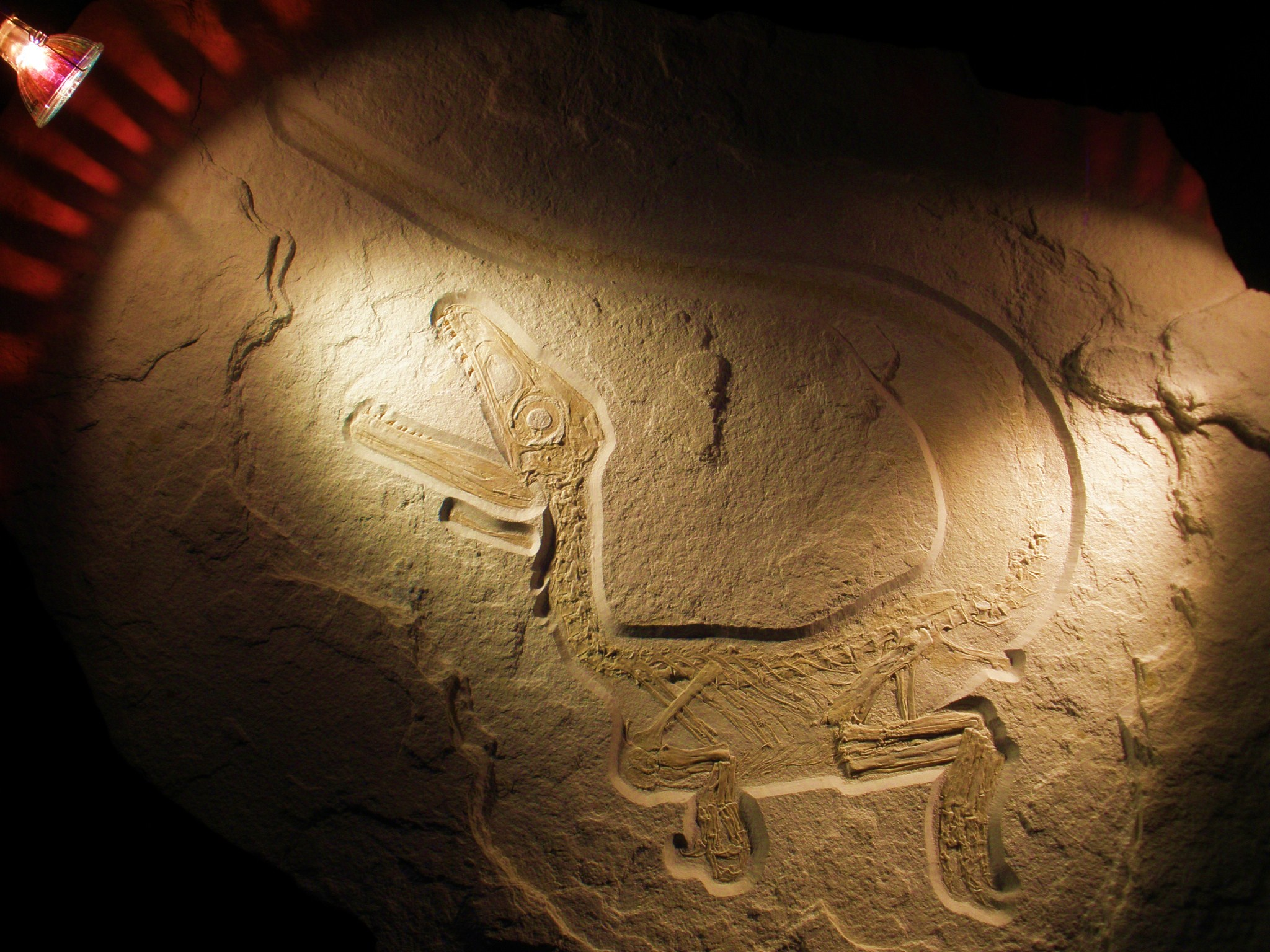
- The juvenile type specimen

Scientific classification
- Kingdom: Animalia
- Phylum: Chordata
- Clade: Dinosauria
- Clade: Saurischia
- Clade: Theropoda
- Clade: Orionides
- Genus: †Sciurumimus; Rauhut et al., 2012
- Species: †S. albersdoerferi

Binomial name
- †Sciurumimus albersdoerferi Rauhut et al., 2012

= Sciurumimus =

Sciurumimus Temporal range: Late Jurassic, 150 Ma

Extinct genus of dinosaurs

Sciurumimus ("squirrel mimic," named for its tail's resemblance to that of the tree squirrel genus Sciurus) is an extinct genus of tetanuran theropod from the Late Jurassic Torleite Formation of Germany. It is known from a single juvenile specimen representing the type species, Sciurumimus albersdoerferi, which was found in a limestone quarry close to Painten in Lower Bavaria. The specimen was preserved with traces of feather-like filaments.

The Sciurumimus specimen was first announced in an informal presentation by Rauhut and Foth (2011), but not formally described and named until the following year by Rauhut et al. (2012). Although originally classified as a basal megalosauroid, later phylogenetic analyses dispute this placement. However, a recent analysis on immature coelurosaurs, including compsognathids, finds Sciurumimus back in Megalosauroidea.

== Description ==
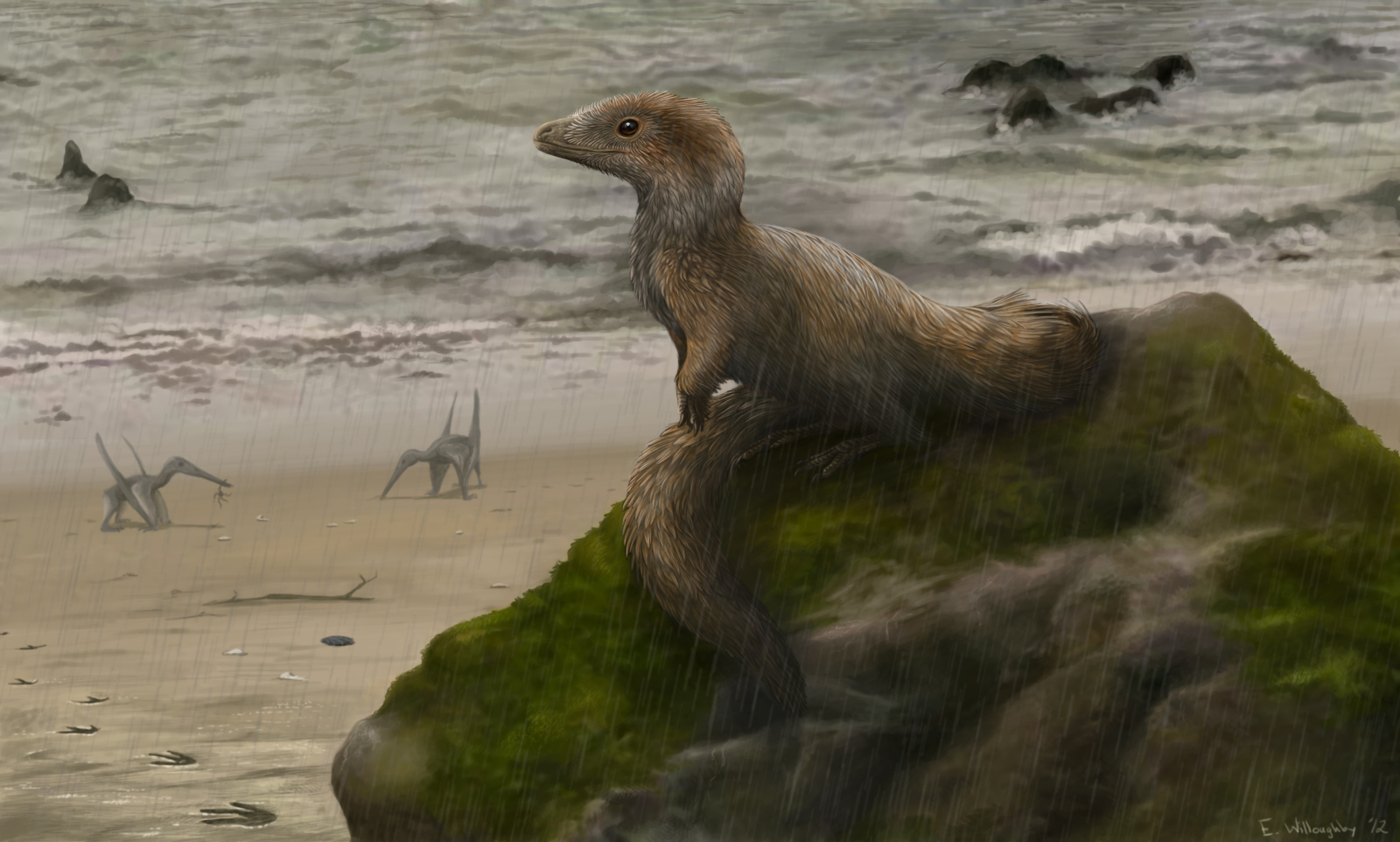
Life restoration of a juvenile Sciurumimus, with two Pterodactylus in the background

Sciurumimus is known from a single holotype fossil that is exceptionally well-preserved, with full skeleton in complete articulation along with fine details of soft tissue. It is comparable in size and proportions to the juvenile coelurosaur Juravenator, although differs significantly in several anatomical details. The skull of Sciurumimus is proportionally large, at 156% of the length of the femur and longer than the cervical vertebrae series. These body proportions, along with short forelimbs, lack of fusion in the skeleton, and regular tooth morphology indicate the specimen represents a very young, probably early-posthatchling individual.

The fossil preserves filamentous plumage at the tail base and on other parts of the body. These structures are described as being identical to the stage 1 feathers preserved in some ornithischians, the basal tyrannosaur Dilong, and the basal therizinosauroid Beipiaosaurus. Skin is also preserved. Although most of the preserved soft tissue on the Sciurumimus holotype likely represent integumentary structures, a small patch of what may be muscle tissue is observed along the rear edge of the tibia.

== Classification ==
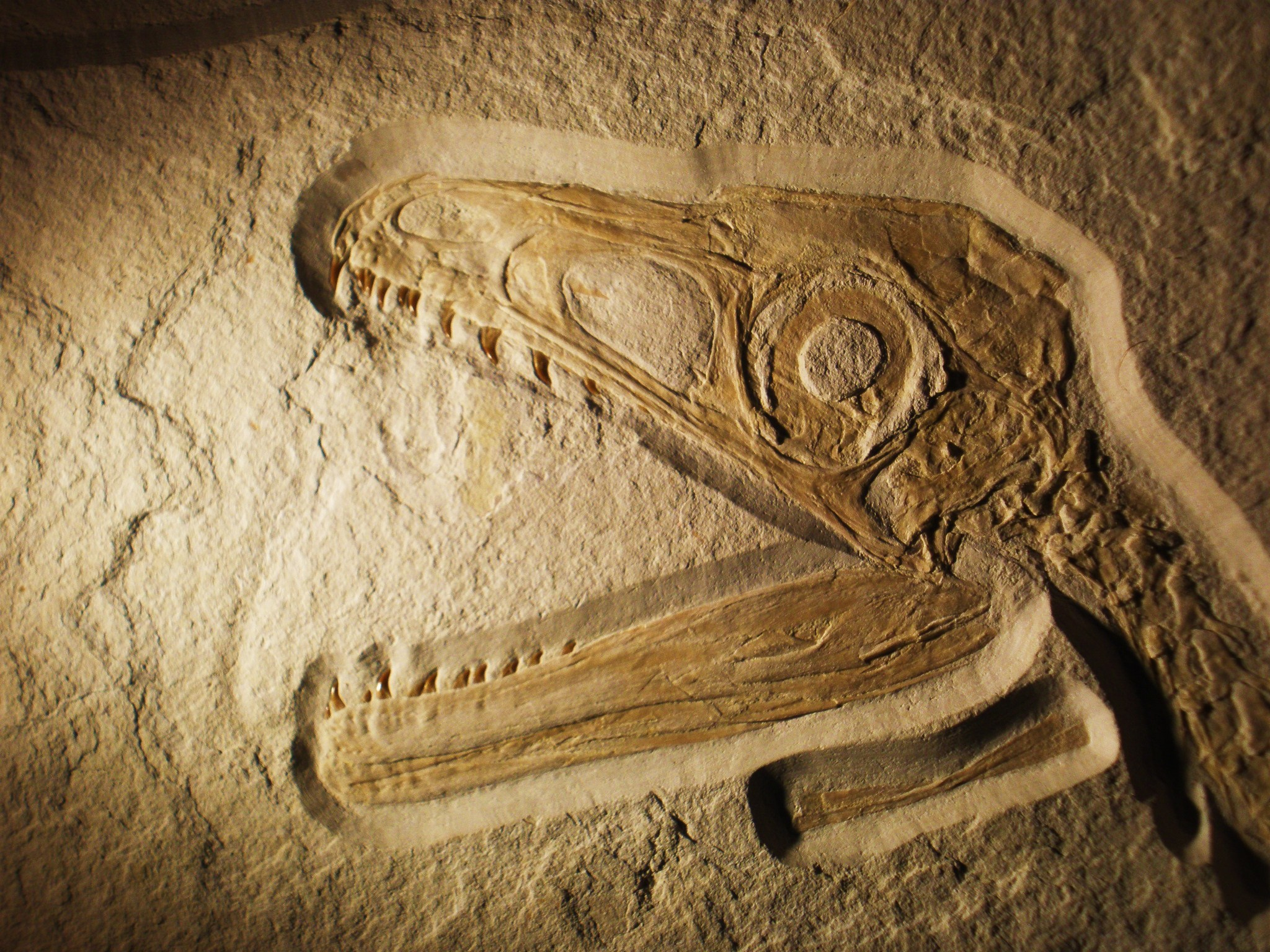
Close up of the skull

When first discovered, a phylogenetic analysis suggested that Sciurumimus may have been a primitive member of the Megalosauroidea, a clade of large carnivorous dinosaurs more primitive than many other well-known theropods like the tyrannosauroids and carnosaurs, making it the most basal known feathered theropod. This classification was supported by one of three initial analyses conducted by the scientists who described it. The other two analyses, which the authors regarded as less well supported, found it as more closely related to Monolophosaurus and Avetheropoda, and in an unresolved position among avetheropods and megalosauroids, respectively. The exact position in the various analyses was difficult to determine due to the fact that the only known specimen is a very young juvenile.

This initial study was criticized by several researchers, who noted that some of the old analyses the scientists used to plug in data from the new fossil were incomplete and missing relevant data on various species. In an analysis published in 2013 Sciurumimus was obtained as one of the most primitive members of the Coelurosauria, more derived than the megalosauroids. However, this analysis focused on the Coelurosauria and the dataset on which it was based contained only one megalosaurid and only four terminal taxa outside the Coelurosauria. Other analyses found it to be an allosauroid or a tetanuran outside Avetheropoda. Paul (2016) placed it among basal neocoelurosaurs. A detailed reanalysis of the taxon was done in the supplementary material of Hartman et al. (2019) which found several characters to be misscored, and when the uncorrected Sciurumimus was placed in the matrix Juravenator was also found to be a basal tetanuran, while if Sciurumimus was absent Juravenator would be found to be a basal coelurosaur. The analysis found Sciurumimus to be a compsognathid, though they noted that this position was tentative. Foth et al. (2020) again placed, albeit tentatively, Sciurumimus in Megalosauroidea, this time accompanied by Juravenator.

Andrea Cau, in 2024, recovered Sciurumimus, along with Compsognathus and Scipionyx all within different positions within Megalosauroidea.

Here is a simplified phylogeny of Cau (2024) with Sciurumimus in bold.

- Tetanurae
  - - Siamraptor
    - Siamotyrannus
  - Orionides
    - - Streptospondylus
      - Xuanhanosaurus
      - Poekilopleuron
      - Piveteausaurus
      - Piatnitzkysaurus
      - Marshosaurus
      - Leshansaurus
      - Eustreptospondylus
      - Condorraptor
      - Asfaltovenator
      - - **Sciurumimus**
        - Nedcolbertia
        - Magnosaurus
        - Duriavenator
        - Afrovenator
        - - Compsognathus longipes
          - Compsognathus corallestris
          - Torvosaurus tanneri
          - Torvosaurus gurneyi
          - Megalosaurus
          - - Scipionyx
            - Wiehenvenator
            - Iberospinus
            - - Baryonychinae
              - Spinosaurinae
    - Avetheropoda
      - Allosauroidea (Incl. Juravenator at an indeterminate position)
      - Coelurosauria
        - Sinosauropteryx
        - Sinocalliopteryx
        - Mirischia
        - Huaxiagnathus
        - Zuolong
        - Tyrannoraptora
          - Maniraptoromorpha
          - - NGMC 2124
            - Tanycolagreus
            - Stokesosaurus
            - Juratyrant
            - Eutyrannosauria
