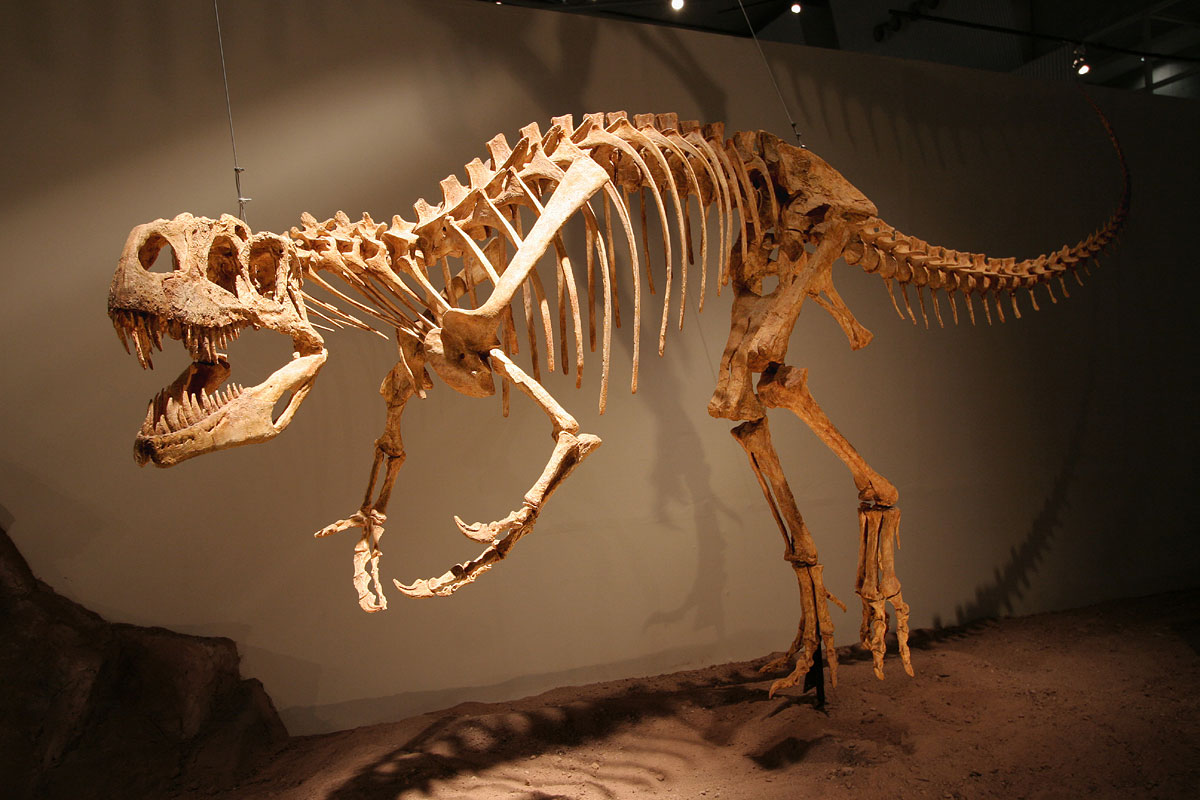
- Reconstructed skeleton in Japan

Scientific classification
- Kingdom: Animalia
- Phylum: Chordata
- Class: Reptilia
- Clade: Dinosauria
- Clade: Saurischia
- Clade: Theropoda
- Family: †Megalosauridae
- Genus: †Afrovenator; Sereno et al. 1994
- Species: †A. abakensis

Binomial name
- †Afrovenator abakensis Sereno et al. 1994

= Afrovenator =

Afrovenator Temporal range: Middle-Late Jurassic 167–157 Ma

Extinct genus of theropod dinosaurs

Afrovenator (/ˌæfroʊvɪˈneɪtər/; "African hunter") is an extinct genus of megalosaurid theropod dinosaur from the Middle or Late Jurassic Tiourarén Formation and maybe the Irhazer II Formation of the Sahara region of Niger in western Africa. Afrovenator represents the only named definitive Gondwanan megalosaur, with proposed material of the group present in the Tacuarembó Formation of Uruguay and the Tendaguru Formation of Tanzania, both dated to the Late Jurassic.

== Discovery and naming ==
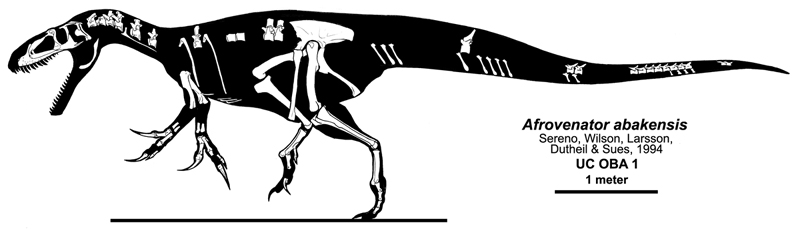
Skeletal diagram of known material

The remains of Afrovenator were discovered in 1993 in the Tiourarén Formation of the department of Agadez in Niger. The Tiourarén was originally thought to represent the Hauterivian to Barremian stages of the early Cretaceous Period, or approximately 132 to 125 million years ago (Sereno et al. 1994). However, re-interpretation of the sediments showed that they are probably Middle to Late Jurassic in age, dating Afrovenator to the Bathonian to Oxfordian stages, between 167 and 161 mya. The sauropod Jobaria, whose remains were first mentioned in the same paper which named Afrovenator, is also known from this formation.

Afrovenator is known from a single relatively complete skeleton, holotype UC OBA 1, featuring most of the skull minus its top (likewise the mandible, or lower jaws, are lacking apart from the prearticular bone), parts of the spinal column, partial forelimbs, a partial pelvis, and most of the hind limbs. This skeleton is housed at the University of Chicago.

The generic name comes from the Latin afer, "African", and venator, "hunter". There is one named species, Afrovenator abakensis. The generic name refers to its predatory nature, and its provenance from Africa. The specific name refers to Abaka, the Tuareg name for the region of Niger where the fossil was found. The original short description of both genus and species is found in a 1994 paper which appeared in the prestigious journal Science. The primary author was well-known American paleontologist Paul Sereno, with Jeffrey Wilson, Hans Larsson, Didier Dutheil, and Hans-Dieter Sues as coauthors.

Recent discoveries in the region include referred teeth (MUPE HB-118, 125, 142) from the underliying Irhazer II Formation and TP4-12, a rostral part of left maxilla from the Tiourarén Formation at NE Tadibene. New semiarticulated specimens, including previously unknown sections of the skeleton, were also recovered from the locality of Tawachi.

== Description ==
Size of Afrovenator (in orange) compared to two other afrovenatorines

Judging from the one skeleton known, this dinosaur was about 8 meters (26 feet) long, from snout to tail tip, and had a weight of about 1 tonne according to Gregory S. Paul. Thomas R. Holtz Jr. estimated it at 7.6 meters (25 feet) in length and 453–907 kg (999–2,000 lb) in weight. In 2016 it was given a lower estimation of 6.8 meters (22 feet) in length, 1.9 meters (6.2 feet) tall at the hips and 790 kg (1,740 lb) in weight. Sereno stressed that the general build was gracile and that the forelimbs and the lower leg were relatively long: the humerus has length of forty centimetres and the tibia and fourth metatarsal measure 687 and 321 millimetres respectively, as compared to a thighbone length of seventy-six centimetres.

Several autapomorphies have been established, traits that distinguish Afrovenator from its nearest relatives. The depression in which the antorbital fenestra is located, has a front end in the form of a lobe. The third neck vertebra has a low rectangular spine. The crescent-shaped wrist bone is very flat. The first metacarpal has a broadly expanding contact surface with the second metacarpal. The foot of the pubic bone is notched from behind.

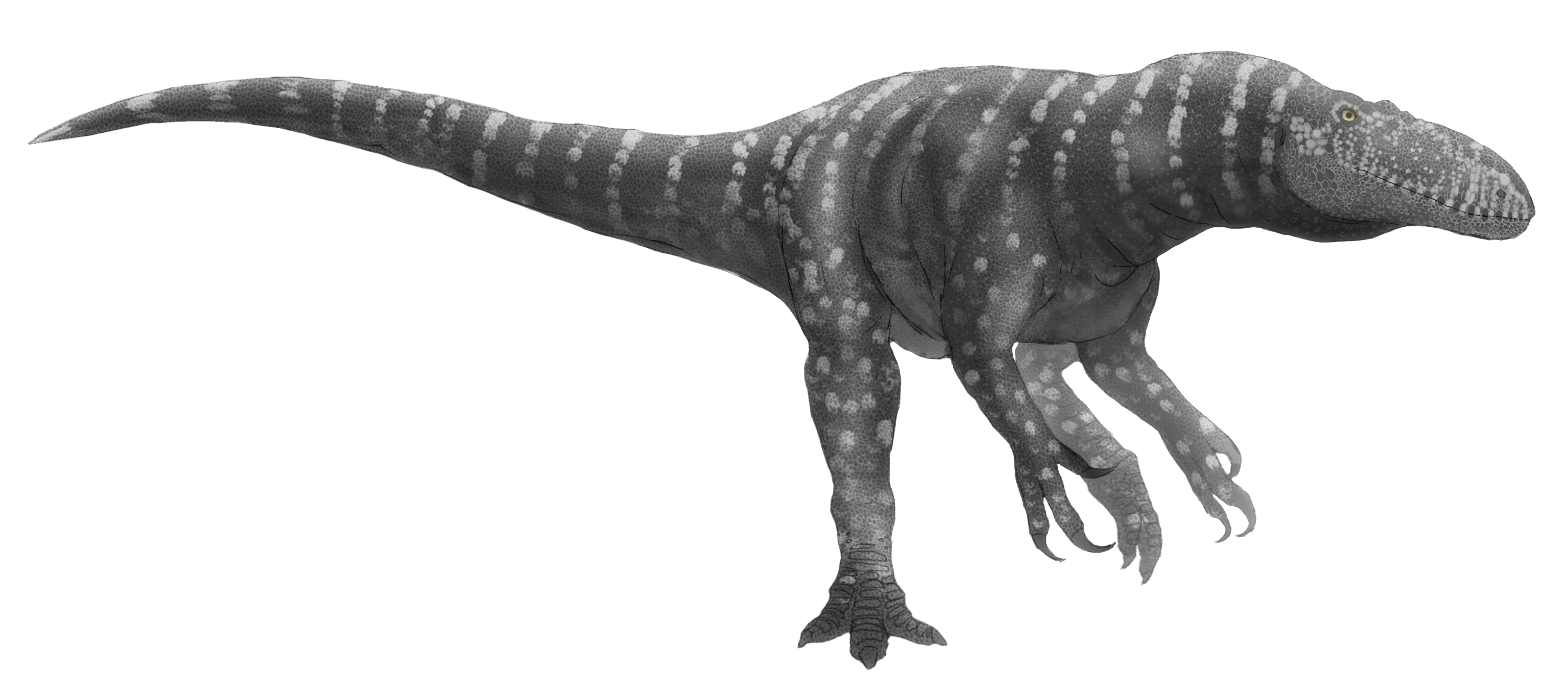
Speculative life restoration

In general the skull is rather flat, its height being less than three times its length, which cannot be exactly determined because the praemaxillae are lacking. The maxilla, which has a long front branch, bears fourteen teeth, as can be deduced from the tooth sockets: the teeth themselves have been lost. There is a small maxillary fenestra, which does not reach the edge of the antorbital depression and is located behind a promaxillary fenestra. The lacrimal bone has a distinctive rounded horn on top. The lower branch of the postorbital bone is transversely wide. The jugal bone is short, deep and pneumatised. The teeth wear distinctive proximodistally subrectangular distocentral denticles and a sigmoidal shape in distal view, seen also on Torvosaurus. Afrovenator had a flexible, S-shaped neck and probably had well-developed neck muscles, allowing for stronger side-to-side and up-and-down movements, as well more power for feeding than Allosaurus, but not as strong as Spinosaurus and other spinosaurids. New specimens uncovered recently have record an updated premaxillae that shows a nasal process with a less steep angle than previously thought, giving Afrovenator a slightly larger nostril.

Limb material from new specimens revelated hindlimbs shorter than the holotype, with a proportional larger tibia. Based on a new nearly complete foot, Afrovenator had better running adaptations than Allosaurus but not as good as Aucasaurus, lacking some features for fast running seen in abelisaurids.

== Classification ==
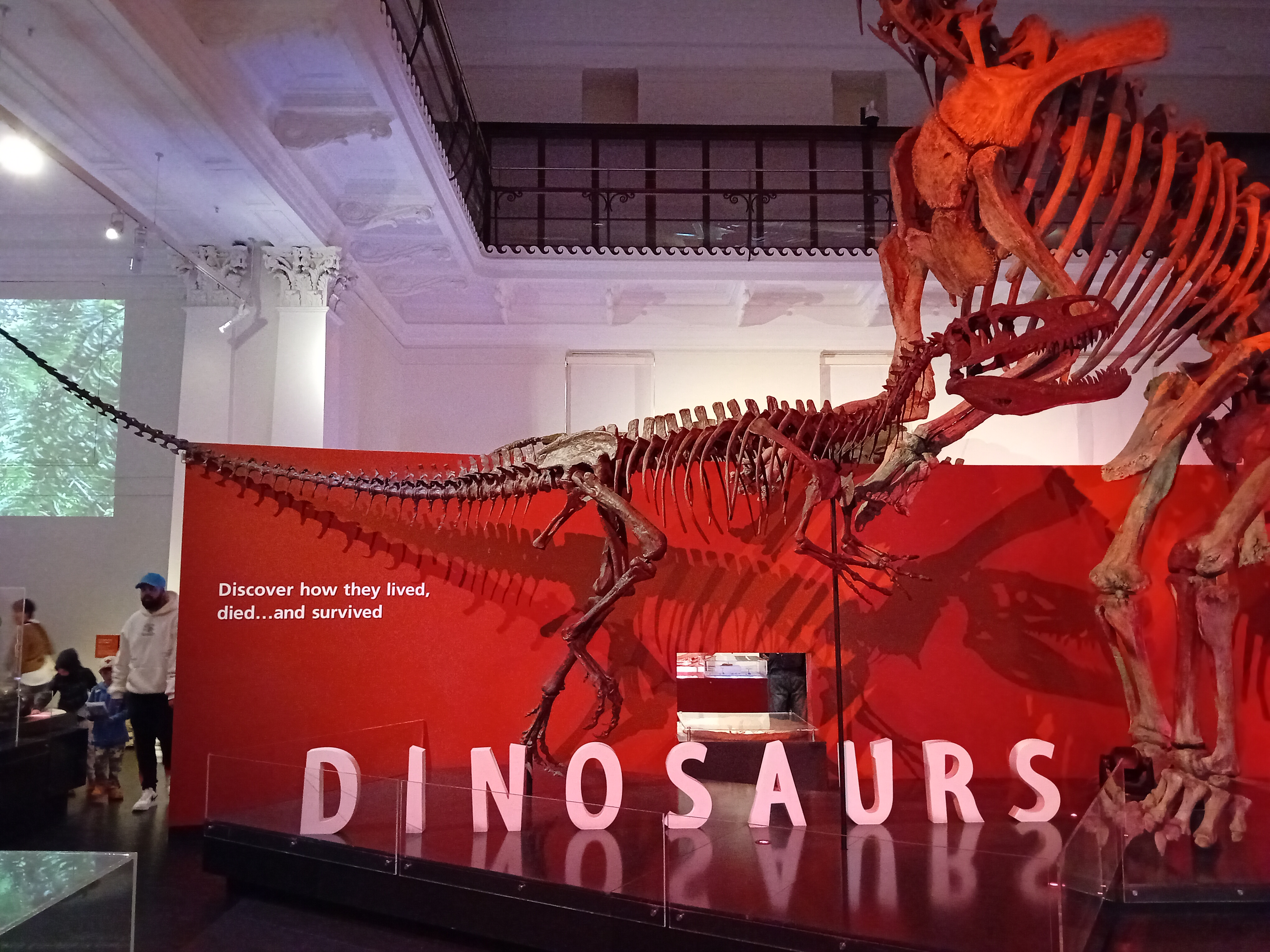
Reconstructed skeleton, Australian Museum

Most analyses place Afrovenator within the Megalosauridae, which was formerly a "wastebasket family" which contained many large and hard-to-classify theropods, but has since been redefined in a meaningful way, as a sister taxon to the family Spinosauridae within the Megalosauroidea.

A 2002 analysis, focused mainly on the noasaurids, found Afrovenator to be a basal megalosaurid. However, it did not include Dubreuillosaurus (formerly Poekilopleuron valesdunensis), which could affect the results in that region of the cladogram (Carrano et al. 2002). Other more recent and more comprehensive cladistic analyses have recovered Afrovenator in a group of Megalosauridae with Eustreptospondylus and Dubreuillosaurus. This group is either called Megalosaurinae (Allain 2002) or Eustreptospondylinae (Holtz et al. 2004). The latter study also includes Piatnitzkysaurus in this clade. A study by Matthew Carrano from 2012 placed Afrovenator in the megalosaurid clade Afrovenatorinae.

A few alternative hypotheses have been presented for Afrovenator's relationships. In Sereno's original description, Afrovenator was found to be a basal spinosauroid (he at the time used the name "Torvosauroidea"), outside of Spinosauridae and Megalosauridae (which he called "Torvosauridae").

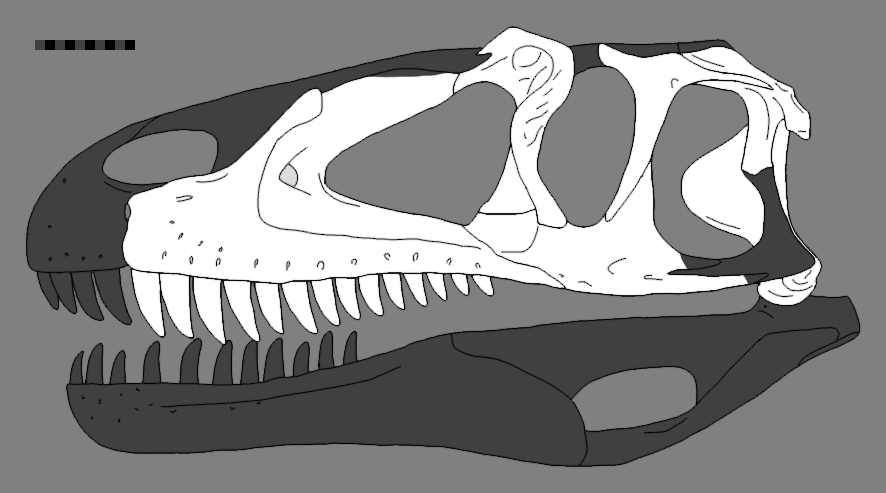
Diagram showing known skull elements

In their 2023 redescrpition of the spinosaurid Irritator, Schade et al. recovered Afrovenator as megalosauroid in a clade excluding Dubreuillosaurus, Magnosaurus, Eustreptospondylus, and Streptospondylus, which were instead placed close to the Spinosauridae. These results are displayed in the cladogram below:

- Avetheropoda
  - Coelurosauria
  - Carnosauria
    - - Monolophosaurus
      - Chuandongocoelurus
    - - Allosauroidea
        - - Marshosaurus
          - - Condorraptor
            - Piatnitzkysaurus
        - - Poekilopleuron
          - - Asfaltovenator
            - - - Lourinhanosaurus
                - Xuanhanosaurus
              - - Metriacanthosauridae
                - - Saurophaganax
                  - - Allosaurus
                    - Carcharodontosauria
      - Megalosauroidea
        - - Spinosauridae
          - - Dubreuillosaurus
            - - Magnosaurus
              - - Eustreptospondylus
                - Streptospondylus
        - - Duriavenator
          - - Afrovenator
            - - Piveteausaurus
              - - Leshansaurus
                - - Megalosaurus
                  - - Torvosaurus
                    - Wiehenvenator
