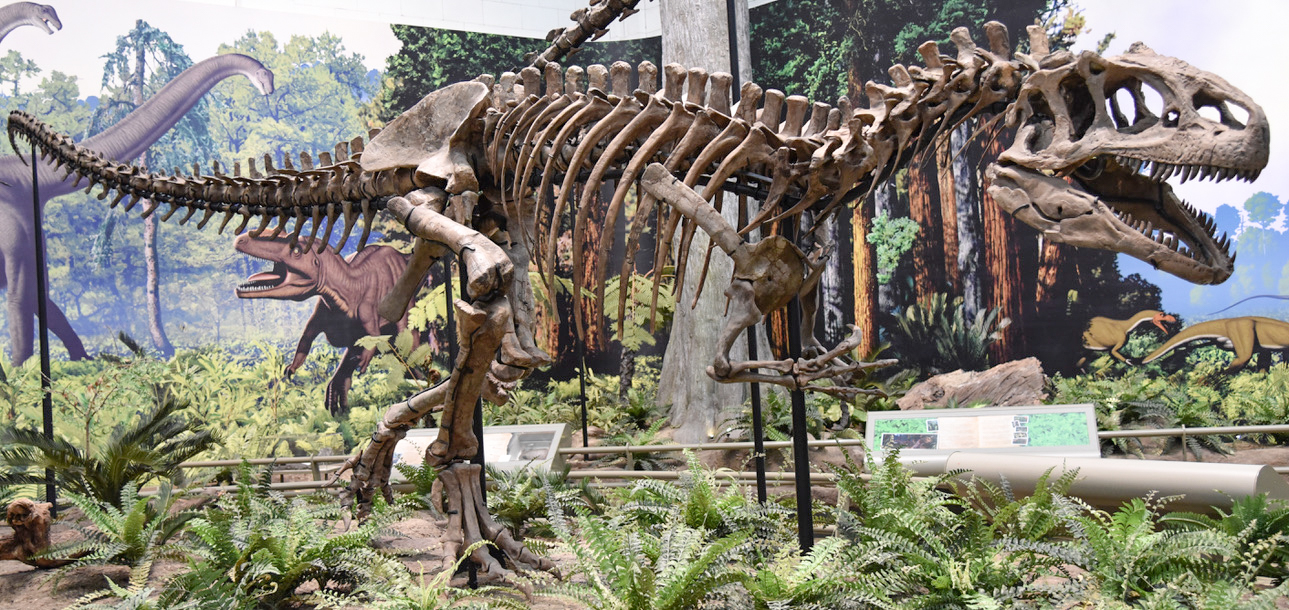
- An A. fragilis skeletal mount, at the Carnegie Museum of Natural History

Scientific classification
- Kingdom: Animalia
- Phylum: Chordata
- Class: Reptilia
- Clade: Dinosauria
- Clade: Saurischia
- Clade: Theropoda
- Superfamily: †Allosauroidea
- Family: †Allosauridae; Marsh, 1878

Type species
- †Allosaurus fragilis Marsh, 1877

Genera
- †Allosaurus; †Antrodemus?; †Asfaltovenator?; †Epanterias?; †Piveteausaurus?; †Saurophaganax?

Synonyms
- Antrodemidae Marsh, 1878; Labrosauridae Marsh, 1882

= Allosauridae =

Allosaurids Temporal range: Bathonian-Tithonian, 174.1–143.1 Ma

Extinct family of theropod dinosaurs

Allosauridae is an extinct family of medium to large bipedal, carnivorous allosauroid theropod dinosaurs from the Late Jurassic. Allosauridae is a fairly old taxonomic group, having been first named by the American paleontologist Othniel Charles Marsh in 1878.

== Description ==
Allosaurids have a general anatomy typical of other neotheropod dinosaurs, contributing to the difficulty in defining the family's membership. A typical 8m specimen of Allosaurus fragilis had a skull of about 0.85m. The premaxilla has five teeth and the maxilla usually around 16. The dentary also typically has 16 teeth. All teeth are serrated and continuously replaced throughout the life of the animal. Allosaurid skulls are characterized by two sets of crests formed by the nasal and lacrimal bones respectively. These crests would have been covered by keratin sheathes. The skull also exhibits features consistent with significant cranial kinesis: a synovial joint between the braincase and the frontals and a loose articulation between the dentary and the angular/surangular. This cranial kinesis would have dampened forces on the bones of the skull and allowed allosaurids to open their mouths to very large angles.

Allosaurids have 28 precaudal vertebrae (9 cervical, 14 dorsal, 5 sacral) and an estimated 45–50 caudal vertebrae. Gastralia and furculae are rarely preserved as fossils but are presumed to occur in all allosaurids. The pubis is highly elongated and extends ventrally to form a pubic foot which like in other large dinosaurs is thought to have been used to support the weight of the body in a resting crouch position.

Like most other theropods, allosaurids have very short forelimbs relative to their hindlimbs with three digits on the hand and four on the foot. The first digit of the hand forms a semi-opposable thumb and digits 4 and 5 are absent. Digits 2–4 of the foot are robust but digit 1 is reduced and does not touch the ground and digit 5 is absent. All distal phalanges were capped with large claws, those on the hand were especially long and were curved to facilitate raking and grasping of prey items. Phalangeal formulae of the hand and foot are 2-3-4 and 2-3-4-5 respectively.

== Classification ==
In 2019, Rauhut and Pol described Asfaltovenator vialidadi, a basal allosauroid displaying a mosaic of primitive and derived features seen within Tetanurae. Their phylogenetic analysis found traditional Megalosauroidea to represent a basal grade of carnosaurs, paraphyletic with respect to Allosauroidea. They also noted that the definitive taxonomic placement of Saurophaganax within Allosauroidea is unstable, being recovered as a sister taxon of Metriacanthosauridae or Allosauria, or even as a basalmost carcharodontosaurian.

- Carnosauria
  - Spinosauridae
  - - Megalosauridae
    - Allosauroidea
      - Piatnitzkysauridae
      - - - Asfaltovenator vialidadi
          - - Metriacanthosauridae
            - Allosauria
              - Allosauridae
              - Carcharodontosauria
                - Neovenatoridae
                - Carcharodontosauridae

In 2024, re-examinations of the specimens attributed to Saurophaganax suggested that it is a chimera of multiple dinosaur genera, since some specimens most likely belong to a diplodocid sauropod, while the other referred allosaurid specimens belong to a novel species of Allosaurus, named as Allosaurus anax.
