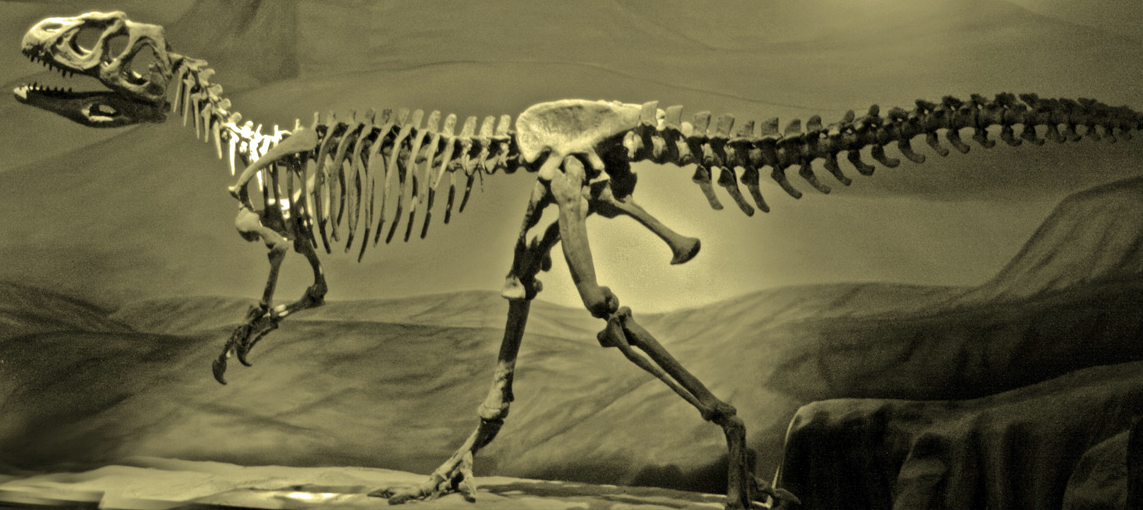
- Piatnitzkysaurus, type genus of the Piatnitzkysauridae

Scientific classification
- Kingdom: Animalia
- Phylum: Chordata
- Class: Reptilia
- Clade: Dinosauria
- Clade: Saurischia
- Clade: Theropoda
- Clade: †Carnosauria (?)
- Family: †Piatnitzkysauridae; Carrano, Benson & Sampson, 2012

Type species
- †Piatnitzkysaurus floresi Bonaparte, 1979

Genera
- †Condorraptor; †Marshosaurus; †Piatnitzkysaurus; †Xuanhanosaurus?

= Piatnitzkysauridae =

Piatnitzkysaurids Temporal range: Early - Late Jurassic, 179–152 Ma

Extinct family of dinosaurs

Piatnitzkysauridae is an extinct family of megalosauroid or basal allosauroid dinosaurs. It only consists of three to four known dinosaur genera: Condorraptor, Marshosaurus, Piatnitzkysaurus and possibly Xuanhanosaurus. The most complete and well-known member of this family is Piatnitzkysaurus, which also gives the family its name.

== Description ==
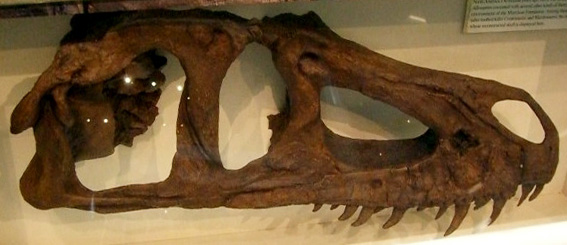
A skull of Marshosaurus showing the maxilla

So far, all known piatnitzkysaurids have only been found in Jurassic deposits of the western hemisphere/New world (however, if Xuanhanosaurus is included, this may expand their range). Piatnitzkysaurus and Condorraptor hail from the Cañadón Asfalto Formation of Argentina, which has been dated from the Toarcian epoch of the Early Jurassic to the Bathonian epoch of the Middle Jurassic (approximately 179 to 168 million years ago). Marshosaurus was found in the Morrison Formation of the United States, which was dated to the Kimmeridgian epoch of the Late Jurassic.

Piatnitzkysaurids were among the first large theropods present in South America, and are evidence for a radiation of basal tetanurans in the middle Jurassic. Although there is support for basal megalosauroid affinities, piatnitzkysaurids also share some traits with allosaurids, such as a 'sigmoidal' humerus.

If piatnitzkysaurids are megalosauroids, they can be distinguished from other megalosauroids due to the following synapomorphies (distinguishing features):

- Nutrient foramina on the surface of the maxilla which are arranged in two parallel rows (also found in Eocarcharia and Shaochilong).
- Vertically striated or ridged paradental plates (also found in Abelisauridae, Megalosaurus and Proceratosaurus).
- Reduced parapophyses on the axis (also found in Coelophysoidea, Eustreptospondylus and Afrovenator).
- Anteriorly inclined posterior dorsal neural spines (in parallel with Allosauroidea).
- A humerus with a canted (bent forward, away from the body) distal condyle (also in Dilophosaurus, Poekilopleuron, Allosauridae and Fukuiraptor). This form has also been described as 'sigmoidal' (S-shaped).

In addition, this family shows several reversals to basal Tetanuran traits. These include:

- A short or absent anterior process of the maxilla (also in Metriacanthosauridae and Carcharodontosauridae).
- Moderately developed (rather than reduced or absent) diapophyses on the axis.
- No pleurocoels on the axis.

== Classification ==
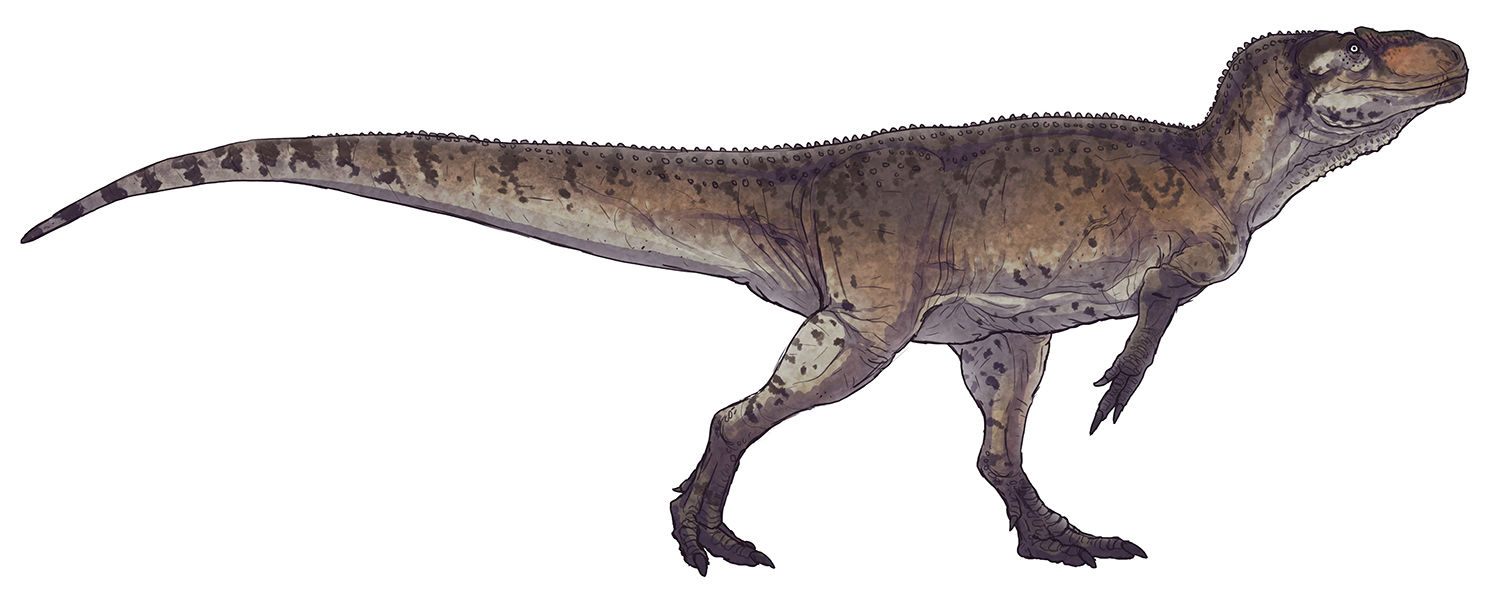
Life restoration of Piatnitzkysaurus

Piatnitzkysauridae is defined as all members of Megalosauroidea more closely related to Piatnitzkysaurus than to either Spinosaurus or Megalosaurus. Condorraptor, Marshosaurus, and Piatnitzkysaurus were all placed in a clade by Benson in 2010 during a redescription of Megalosaurus. This clade was defined as a family by Carrano et al. in 2012. Piatnitzkysauridae has been recovered as the sister taxa to Megalosauria, a clade containing the megalosaurids (such as Megalosaurus and Torvosaurus) and the spinosaurids (such as Spinosaurus and Baryonyx).

Condorraptor and Piatnitzkysaurus are generally grouped together within this family in a clade excluding Marshosaurus. This is not only due to Condorraptor and Piatnitzkysaurus being from the same locality and time period, but also due to them having flat anterior faces of presacral vertebrae as well as a pronounced ventral keel on the anterior dorsal vertebrae. Due to the strong resemblance to Piatnitzkysaurus, it has been suggested that Condorraptor could be better interpreted as the result of individual variation within the species and not a separate taxon. The main noted differences between the two species include both a less well developed enemial crest and a first sacral vertebra with a shallower fossa in Condorraptor.

Xuanhanosaurus, a problematic tetanuran with uncertain affinities, was placed as the sister taxon of these three genera when their relation was first observed in 2010. However, due to the incompleteness of its remains, this placement is considered uncertain. Other studies have considered Xuanhanosaurus a basal tetanuran. This taxon is still sometimes found as a piatnitzkysaurid.

In 2019, Rauhut and Pol described Asfaltovenator vialidadi, a basal allosauroid displaying a mosaic of primitive and derived features seen within Tetanurae. Their phylogenetic analysis found traditional Megalosauroidea to represent a basal grade of carnosaurs, paraphyletic with respect to Allosauroidea. Because the authors amended the definition of Allosauroidea to include all theropods that are closer to Allosaurus fragilis than to either Megalosaurus bucklandii or Neornithes, the Piatnitzkysauridae was found to fall within Allosauroidea. A cladogram displaying the relationships they recovered is shown below:

- Carnosauria
  - Monolophosaurus
  - - Spinosauridae
    - - Megalosauridae
      - Allosauroidea
        - Xuanhanosaurus
        - - Piatnitzkysauridae
            - Marshosaurus
            - - Condorraptor
              - Piatnitzkysaurus
          - - Asfaltovenator
            - - Metriacanthosauridae
              - - Allosaurus
                - Carcharodontosauria

In their 2025 description of the metriacanthosaurid Yuanmouraptor, Zou et al. recovered Piatnitzkysauridae as the sister taxon to Avetheropoda. These results are displayed in the cladogram below.

- Tetanurae
  - Monolophosaurus
  - Chuandongocoelurus
  - - Megalosauroidea
      - Spinosauridae
      - Megalosauridae
    - - Piatnitzkysauridae
        - Marshosaurus
        - - Condorraptor
          - Piatnitzkysaurus
      - Avetheropoda
        - Coelurosauria
        - - Asfaltovenator
          - Allosauroidea
            - Metriacanthosauridae
            - Allosauria
              - - Allosaurus
                - Saurophaganax
              - - Carcharodontosauria
