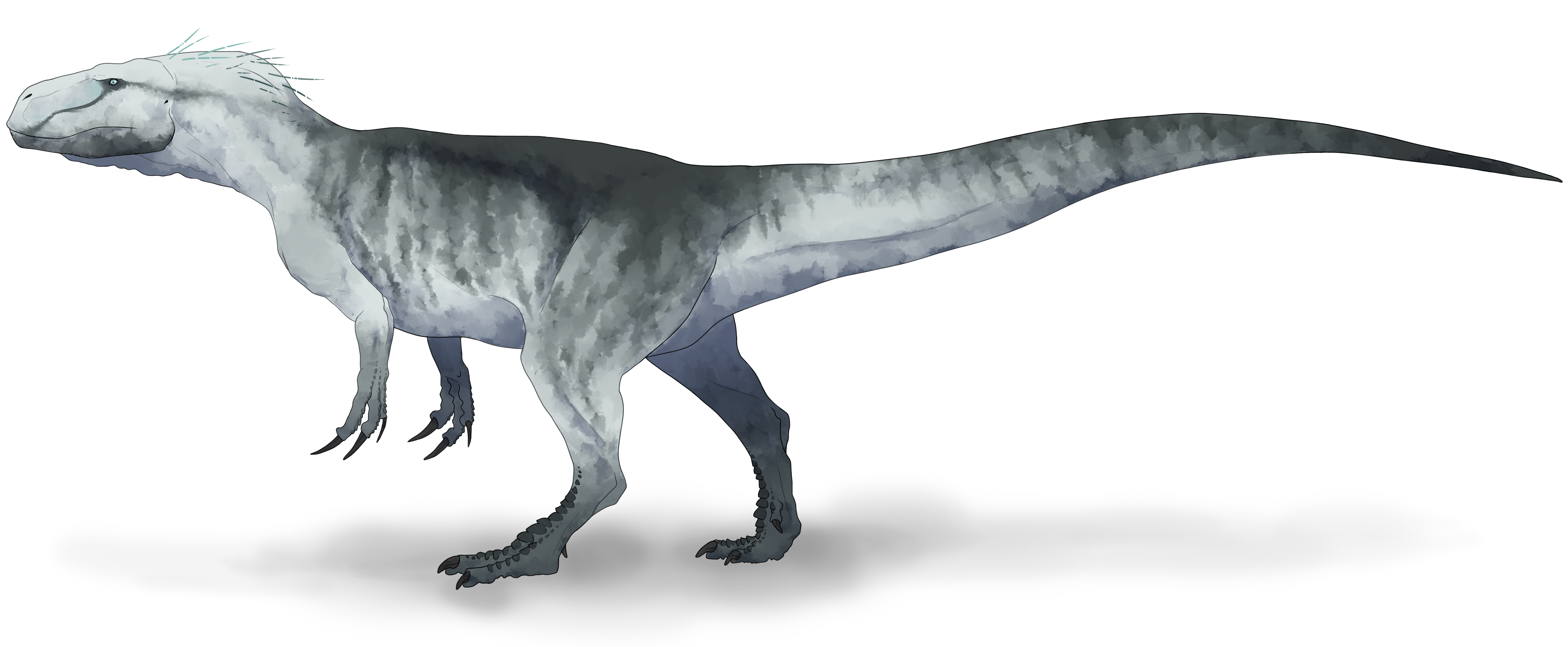
- An artist's restoration of Xuanhanosaurus qilixiaensis

Scientific classification
- Kingdom: Animalia
- Phylum: Chordata
- Clade: Dinosauria
- Clade: Saurischia
- Clade: Theropoda
- Genus: †Xuanhanosaurus; Dong, 1984
- Species: †X. qilixiaensis

Binomial name
- †Xuanhanosaurus qilixiaensis Dong, 1984

= Xuanhanosaurus =

Xuanhanosaurus Temporal range: Bathonian, 166.0 Ma

Extinct genus of dinosaurs

Xuanhanosaurus (meaning "Xuanhan lizard") is a genus of theropod dinosaur that lived during the Middle Jurassic (Bathonian) of the Sichuan Basin, China, around 166 million years ago. This taxon represents one of the various non-coelurosaurian tetanuran taxa found on the Middle Jurassic of the region, uncovered in the Lower Shaximiao Formation. Although it has been known for more than 40 years, this taxon has been the subject of very few studies, although most seem to agree that it is a tetanuran, possibly a basal allosauroid, highlighting the fact that it has a vestigial fourth metacarpal.

== Discovery ==
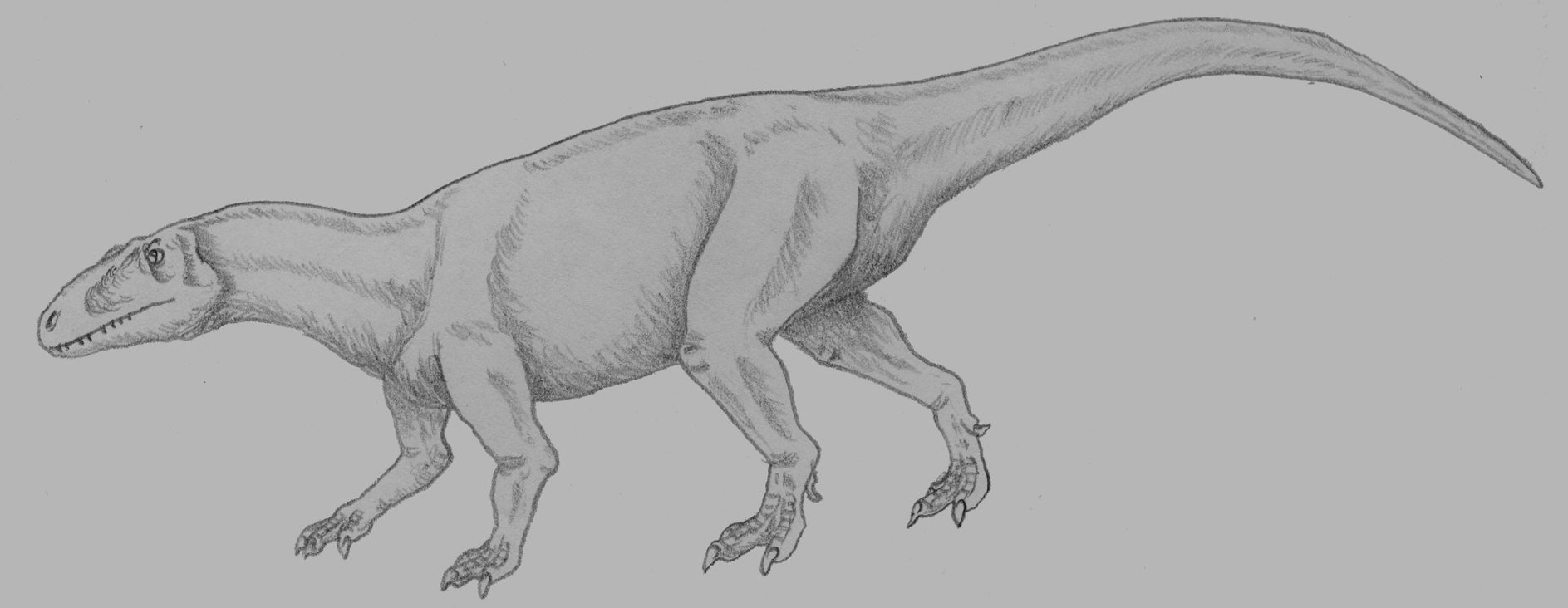
Xuanhanosaurus reconstructed in a quadrupedal position which is now considered outdated.

The type species Xuanhanosaurus qilixiaensis was named by Dong Zhiming in 1984. The generic name refers to Xuanhan County in Sichuan, while the specific name is derived from the town of Qilixia. The specimen was recovered in 1979, when the author was conducting a Dinosaurian Fossil survey in Sichuan Province, when was guided by Liu Yawen and the 137th team to examine the Qilixia section, where they recovered the holotype of this new taxon at the southern flank of the Qili Dorsal Slope. The holotype specimen, IVPP V.6729, was found in China's Lower Shaximiao Formation. It consists of a partial skeleton without a skull, namely a scapula missing the posterior end, coracoid, a possible sternum, humerus, radius, ulna, manus, as well a few fragmentary dorsal vertebrae.

== Description ==
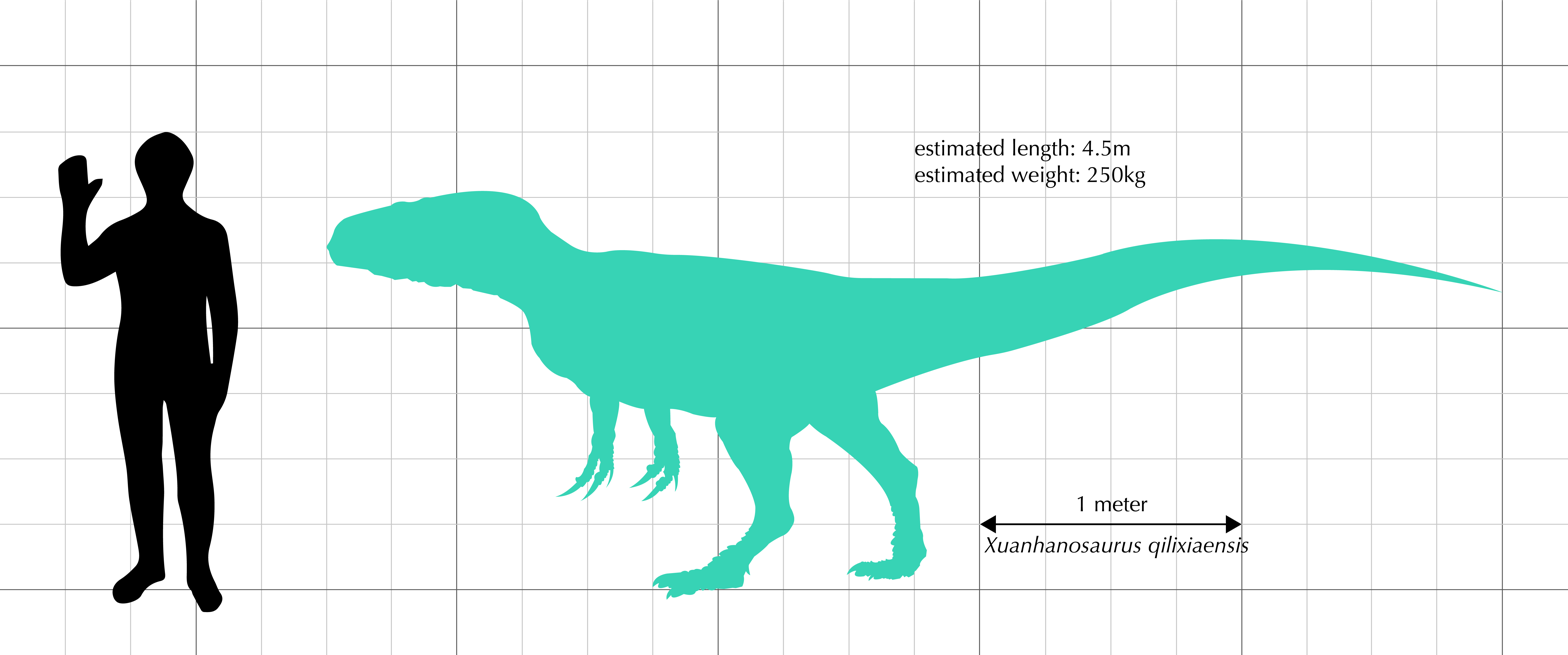
An X. qilixiaensis specimen compared to an average human male

Xuanhanosaurus, originally thought to be around 6 m long, was approximately 4.8 meters (16 ft) in length, with a weight of 265 kilograms (585 lb). Xuanhanosaurus had powerful forelimbs, over 65 cm long; this, along with the retention of the fourth metacarpal in the hand, led Dong to suggest that Xuanhanosaurus might have walked on all four legs. If so, it would be the only known four-legged meat-eater among dinosaurs. Later paleontologists have not agreed with Dong's original assessment. They think this dinosaur walked on its hind legs as other theropods did, pronation of the lower arm being impossible. The strong arms could instead have been useful in catching prey. The retention of the 4th metarcarpal is the most notorious feature of this taxon, yet the presence of a convex proximal surface on the distal carpal 2 has been used to argue it represents a second stage in the evolution of the "semilunate" carpal. Some recent work have notified that beyond the 4th metarcarpal, Xuanhanosaurus also retains ceratosaurian-like short phalanges II-1, similar in length to the ones recovered on Saltriovenator. The scapula was found to be bulkier than in Allosaurus. The distal humerus is enlarged laterally, forming a one-inch step. The vertebrae are posteriorly concave and anteriorly protruding, with cervical centra having flat anterior articular surfaces, also seen in Condorraptor, Piatnitzkysaurus and "Szechuanosaurus" zigongensis, yet lacking posterior pneumatic foramen or fossa, which is seen on the first 2 genera.

== Phylogeny ==
Originally, Xuanhanosaurus was assigned by Dong to the Megalosauridae, when this group was meant to include a larger amount of taxa, and was argued to be in the middle stage of the evolution of the Tetanurae due to its vestigial fourth metacarpals. Latter it was found by Roger Benson in 2009 to belong to a primitive lineage of the Megalosauroidea. A more recent study by Benson and colleagues in 2010 found that it was more likely to be the most primitive known member of the Metriacanthosauridae family. In 2018, based on several conditions such as the length and retention of the vestigial 4th metacarpal, it was argued that this taxon and "Szechuanosaurus" zigongensis belong to early-diverging branches of the ceratosaurian-tetanuran node. In 2019, Rauhut and Pol recovered Xuanhanosaurus outside of Metriacanthosauridae, as the basalmost member of Allosauroidea.

- Carnosauria
  - Monolophosaurus
  - - Spinosauridae
    - - Megalosauridae
      - Allosauroidea
        - Xuanhanosaurus
        - - Piatnitzkysauridae
          - - Asfaltovenator
            - - Metriacanthosauridae
              - - Allosaurus
                - Carcharodontosauria
