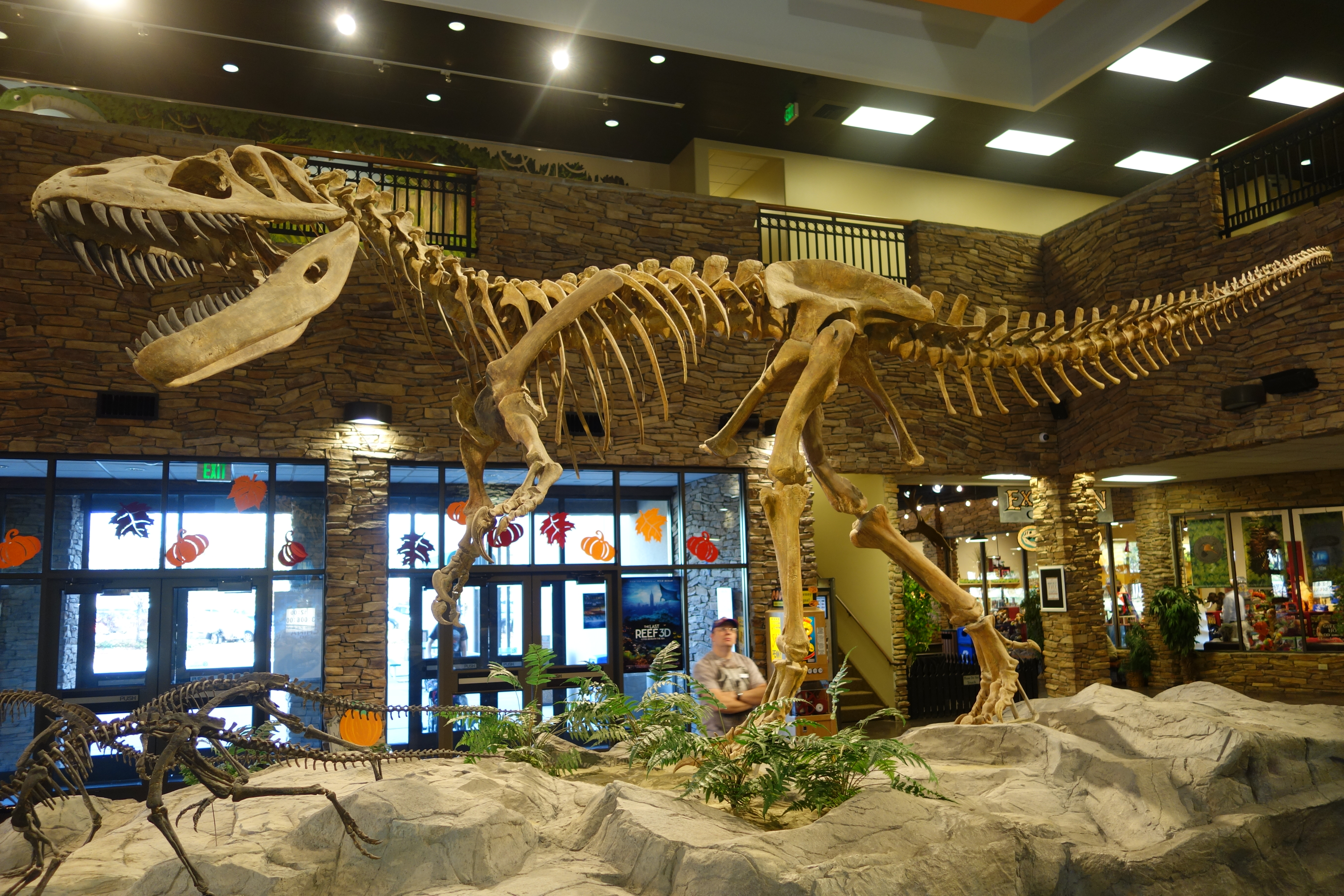
- Torvosaurus skeletal mount, Museum of Ancient Life
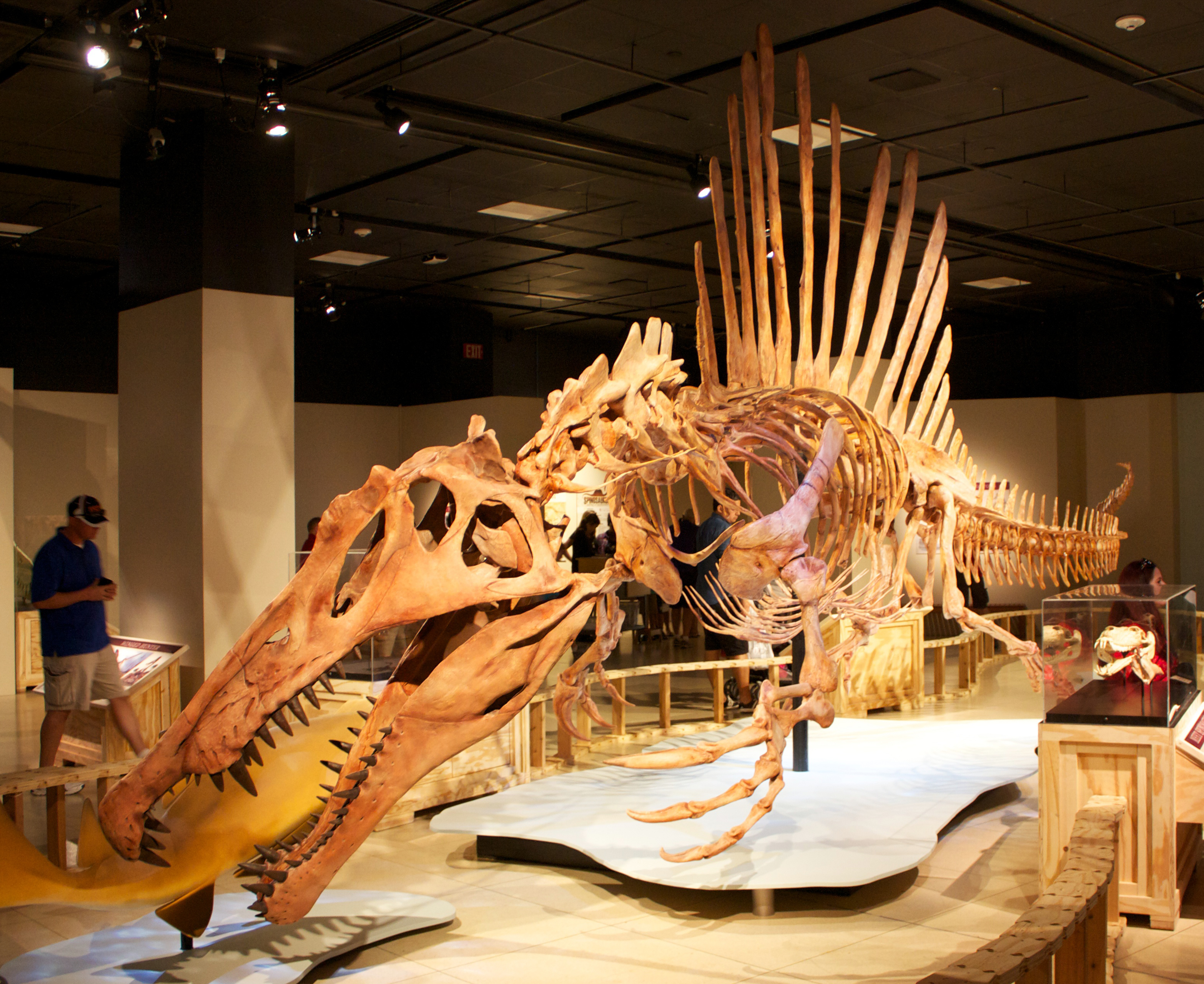
- Spinosaurus skeletal mount, National Geographic Museum

Scientific classification
- Kingdom: Animalia
- Phylum: Chordata
- Class: Reptilia
- Clade: Dinosauria
- Clade: Saurischia
- Clade: Theropoda
- Clade: †Carnosauria (?)
- Superfamily: †Megalosauroidea; Huxley, 1889

Type species
- †Megalosaurus bucklandii Mantell, 1827

Subgroups
- †Asfaltovenator?; †Chuandongocoelurus?; †Cruxicheiros?; †Dandakosaurus?; †Gasosaurus?; †Juravenator?; †Kaijiangosaurus?; †Lourinhanosaurus?; †Monolophosaurus?; †Nedcolbertia?; †Sciurumimus?; †Yunyangosaurus; †Piatnitzkysauridae?; †Megalosauria; †Streptospondylus; †Megalosauridae; †Spinosauridae

Synonyms
- Spinosauroidea Stromer, 1915; Torvosauroidea Nopcsa, 1915; Spinosauria Olshevsky, 1991

= Megalosauroidea =

Megalosauroids Temporal range: Middle Jurassic - Late Cretaceous, 170–94 Ma Probably originated since Toarcian and Possible Campanian-Maastrichtian records

Extinct superfamily of Dinosaurs

Megalosauroidea (meaning 'great/big lizard forms') is a superfamily (or clade) of tetanuran theropod dinosaurs that lived from the Middle Jurassic to the Late Cretaceous period. The group is defined as Megalosaurus bucklandii and all taxa sharing a more recent common ancestor with it than with Allosaurus fragilis or Passer domesticus. Members of the group include Spinosaurus, Megalosaurus, and Torvosaurus. They are possibly paraphyletic in nature with respect to Allosauroidea, which is to say some members of this superfamily might be closer to Allosauroids than to each other, which is undesirable in cladistics.

== Classification ==
The name Spinosauroidea is sometimes used in place of Megalosauroidea. The superfamily Spinosauroidea was named in 1915 by Ernst Stromer. It is a synonym of Megalosauroidea in almost all modern phylogenetic analyses, and it is therefore redundant. Spinosauroidea was defined as a clade in 1998 by Paul Sereno as the node clade containing the common ancestor of Spinosaurus and Torvosaurus and all its descendants. Thomas Holtz in 2004 defined a branch clade with the same name containing all species closer to Spinosaurus than to Passer domesticus. The ICZN holds that even clade names (which do not yet have any governing body) should be replaced if having a traditional taxon suffix and being synonyms of ranked taxa at or below the superfamily level. The seniority of Megalosauroidea was not followed in most paleontological literature during the 1990s and early 2000s. A series of papers supporting the validity of Megalosaurus as a genus, the relationships of megalosauroids, and the placement of "spinosauroids" among them, published between 2008 and 2010 argued that Megalosauroidea was in fact the valid name for the group.

The classification of megalosauroids follows a study by Benson in 2010. Note that several "wildcard" taxa that are probably megalosauroids were excluded from the final tree, including Magnosaurus, Piveteausaurus and Streptospondylus. Later, Magnosaurus and Streptospondylus were added in the final tree. These are known from remains too fragmentary to be reliably classified. Some of these 'wildcard' taxa, such as Poekilopleuron and Megaraptor, have been considered possible megalosauroids in the past, but the analysis found that they are more likely allosauroids.

- Megalosauroidea
  - - Xuanhanosaurus
    - - Marshosaurus
      - - Condorraptor
        - Piatnitzkysaurus
  - - - Chuandongocoelurus
      - Monolophosaurus
    - - Spinosauridae
        - - Baryonyx
          - Suchomimus
        - - Irritator
          - Spinosaurus
      - Megalosauridae
        - Eustreptospondylinae
          - Eustreptospondylus
          - - Magnosaurus
            - Streptospondylus
        - Megalosaurinae
          - Duriavenator
          - - Afrovenator
            - Dubreuillosaurus
          - - Megalosaurus
            - Torvosaurus

Carrano, Benson & Sampson (2012) performed much larger phylogenetic analysis of the Tetanurae that includes more taxa. They used the clade name Megalosauria (Bonaparte, 1850) in their analysis and defined it as the node comprising Megalosaurus, Spinosaurus, their most recent common ancestor, and all its descendants. Furthermore, a new megalosauroid family Piatnitzkysauridae was named to include all megalosauroids more closely related to Piatnitzkysaurus than to either Spinosaurus or Megalosaurus. Within Megalosauridae a new subfamily was named, Afrovenatorinae, to include all megalosaurids more closely related to Afrovenator than to Megalosaurus. Unlike Benson et al., 2010, they recovered Poekilopleuron as an afrovenatorine, while Xuanhanosaurus was recovered as the basalmost metriacanthosaurid. However, the position of these taxa is very unstable, and their exclusion from the analysis gave more resolved and stable cladogram. Streptospondylus was also excluded to get more resolved Megalosauridae and Afrovenatorinae. The Chinese tetanuran Leshansaurus was included for the first time in a phylogenetic analysis, and was recovered as an afrovenatorine. Both Chuandongocoelurus and Monolophosaurus were found to be just outside Orionides. The cladogram presented here follows that study.

- Tetanurae
  - Cryolophosaurus
  - "Dilophosaurus" sinensis
  - - Chuandongocoelurus
    - Monolophosaurus
    - Orionides
      - Avetheropoda
        - Allosauroidea
        - Coelurosauria
          - Lourinhanosaurus
          - Other coelurosaurians
      - Megalosauroidea
        - Piatnitzkysauridae
          - Marshosaurus
          - - Condorraptor
            - Piatnitzkysaurus
        - Megalosauria
          - Streptospondylus
          - Spinosauridae
            - - Baryonyx
              - Suchomimus
            - - Angaturama
              - Irritator
              - Spinosaurus
          - Megalosauridae
            - Eustreptospondylinae
              - Eustreptospondylus
            - - Megalosaurinae
                - Duriavenator
                - - Megalosaurus
                  - Torvosaurus
              - Afrovenatorinae
                - Afrovenator
                - - Dubreuillosaurus
                  - Magnosaurus
                - - Leshansaurus
                  - Piveteausaurus

In 2019, Rauhut and Pol described Asfaltovenator vialidadi, a basal allosauroid displaying a mosaic of primitive and derived features seen within Tetanurae. Their phylogenetic analysis found traditional Megalosauroidea to represent a basal grade of carnosaurs, paraphyletic with respect to Allosauroidea.

- Carnosauria
  - Monolophosaurus
  - - Spinosauridae
    - - Megalosauridae
      - Allosauroidea
        - Xuanhanosaurus
        - - Piatnitzkysauridae
          - - Asfaltovenator
            - - Metriacanthosauridae
              - - Allosaurus
                - Carcharodontosauria

== See also ==
- Carnosauria
- Orionides
