= Qilixia =

- Township
- Location in China
- Coordinates: 33°19′N 109°30′E
- Country: China
- Province: Shaanxi
- Prefecture: Shangluo Prefecture
- County: Zhen'an County

Qilixia is a town in Shaanxi, China. It lies on the West Qinling gold belt.
