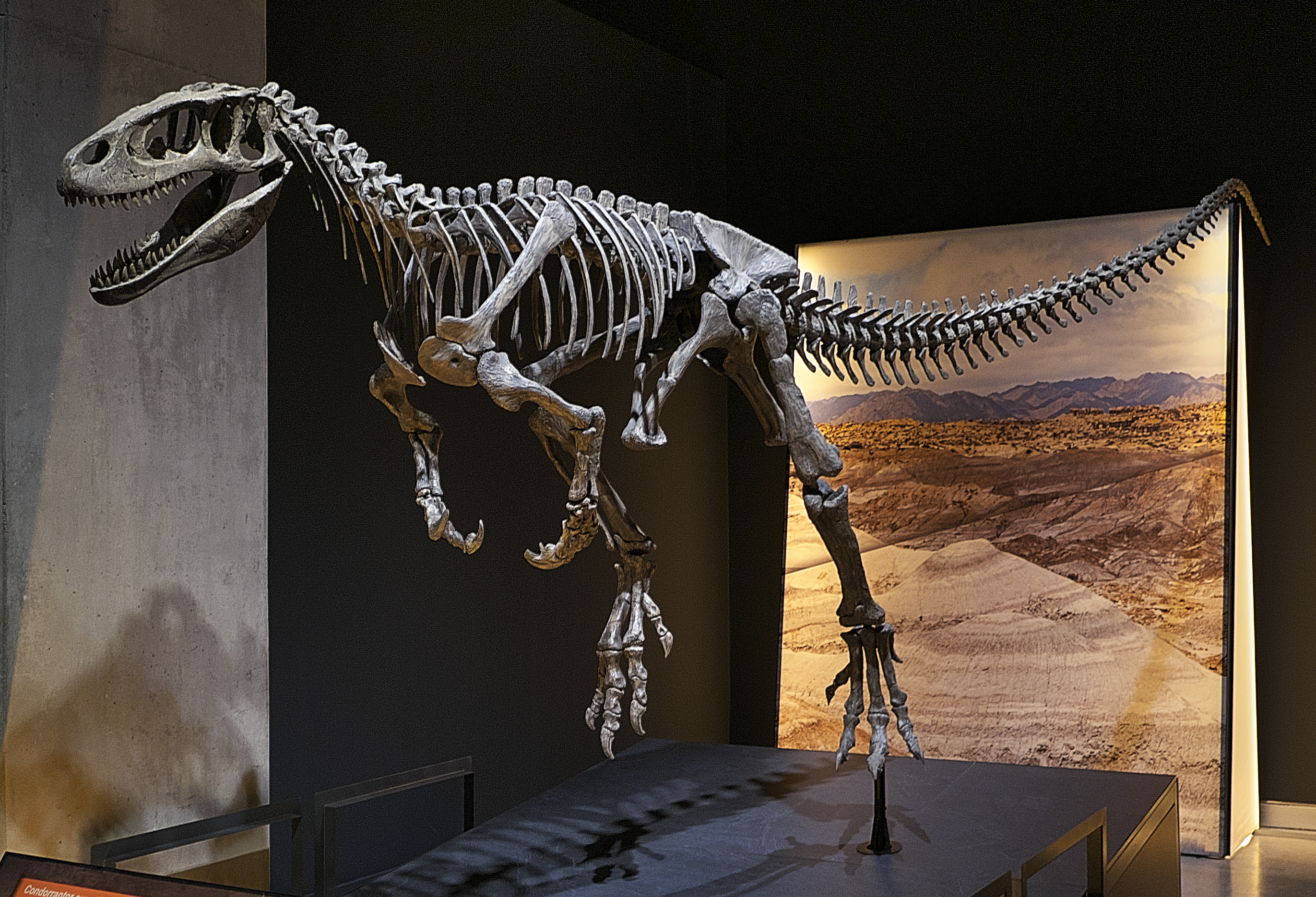
- Mounted skeleton in Museo Paleontológico Egidio Feruglio

Scientific classification
- Kingdom: Animalia
- Phylum: Chordata
- Clade: Dinosauria
- Clade: Saurischia
- Clade: Theropoda
- Family: †Piatnitzkysauridae
- Genus: †Condorraptor; Rauhut 2005
- Species: †C. currumili

Binomial name
- †Condorraptor currumili Rauhut, 2005

= Condorraptor =

Condorraptor Temporal range: Middle Toarcian ~179.17–178.07 Ma

Extinct genus of dinosaurs

Condorraptor is an extinct genus of megalosauroid theropod dinosaur. Its genus name means 'robber from Cerro Condor', referencing a nearby village, while its species name, currumili, is named after Hipolito Currumil, the landowner and discoverer of the locality. It was among the earliest large South American theropods, having been found in Lower Jurassic strata of the Cañadón Asfalto Formation in the Cañadón Asfalto Basin of Argentina. The type species, described in 2005, is Condorraptor currumili. It is based on a tibia, with an associated partial skeleton that may belong to the same individual. Initially described as a basal tetanuran, Benson (2010) found it to be a piatnitzkysaurid megalosauroid and the sister taxon of Piatnitzkysaurus, a finding supported by later studies.

== Description ==
Size comparison

The holotype of Condorraptor is MPEF-PV 1672, a left tibia. Additional remains (MPEF-PV 1673 through 1697 and MPEF-PV 1700 through 1705) have also been referred to the species, including vertebrae, teeth, rib and chevron fragments, partial hip bones, femurs, a metatarsal IV, and a pedal phalanx. All of these remains were from the same locality of the holotype and likely represent the same individual. In 2007, various media outlets reported that an articulated skeleton of this species was discovered by a team led by Oliver Rauhut, but this find has not been described or referenced in literature. Also in 2007, Rauhut described a fragmentary partial skull, MPEF 1717, from the Canadon Asfalto Formation. Due to the skull's size, locality, tetanuran characteristics, and differences from the cranial material of Piatnitzkysaurus, it is possible that it belongs to Condorraptor. The type specimen was a juvenile that was about 4.5 metres long and it weighed about 200 kg.

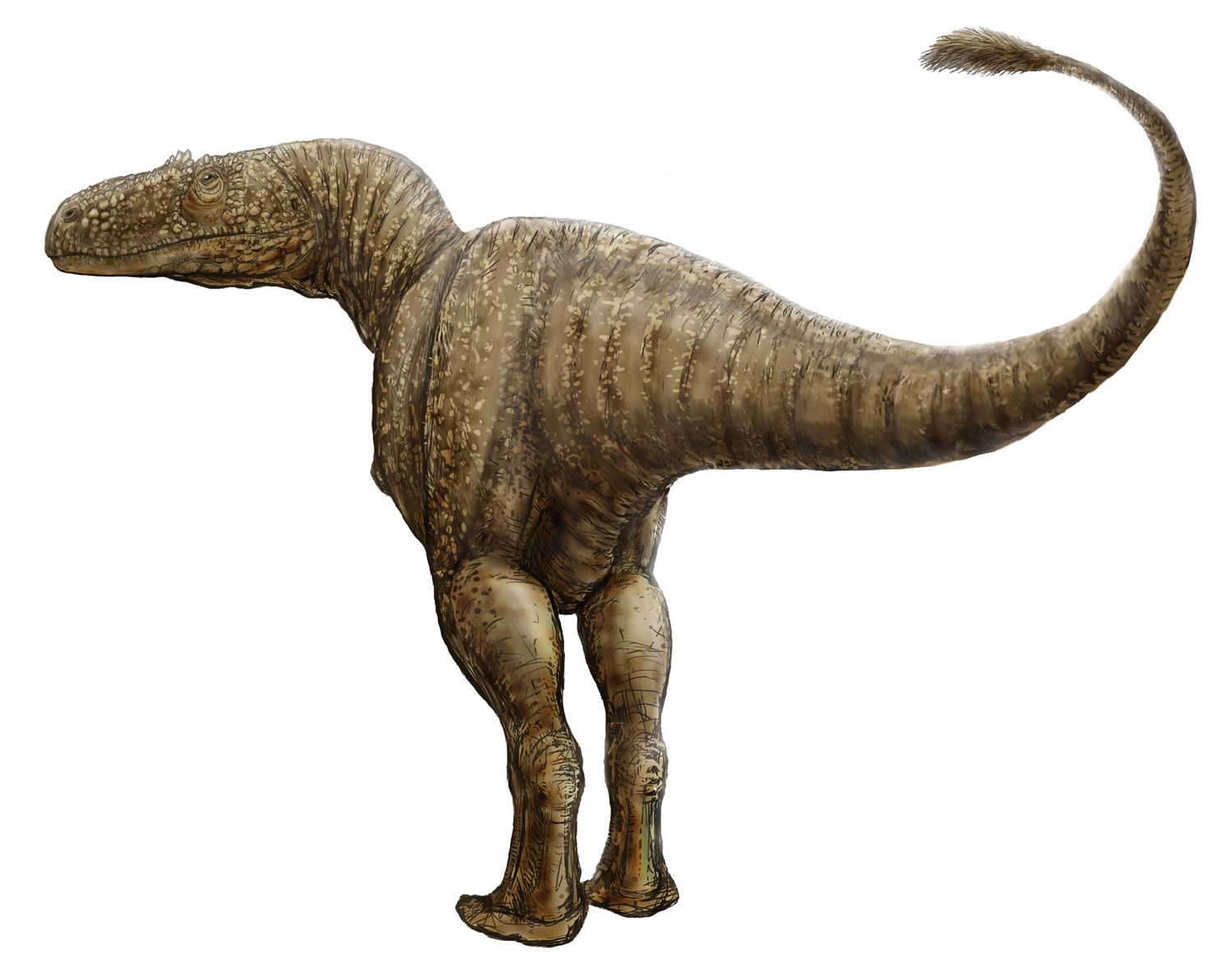
Life restoration

Condorraptor is notably similar to another theropod from the same formation, Piatnitzkysaurus. Unique among tetanurans, these two share a flat anterior surface of the anterior presacral centra. However, it can be distinguished from Piatnitzkysaurus and other megalosauroids by several diagnostic features. Although some features considered diagnostic by the original description were later shown to be present in other megalosauroids, several features are still only known in Condorraptor. These include:

- A pleurocoel in the anterior cervical vertebrae located immediately posterodorsal to the parapophysis.
- A shallow depression on the lateral surface of the tibia at the base of the cnemial crest.
- A metatarsal IV with a distinct dorsal step between the shaft and the distal articular facet.

In addition, Condorraptor differs from Piatnitzkysaurus by the shape of the underside of its sacral centra. In Condorraptor, the second centra has a broad and flat base while the third is gently concave. In Piatnitzkysaurus, the second centra's base is smoothly rounded while the third's is flat along its midline.

== Classification ==
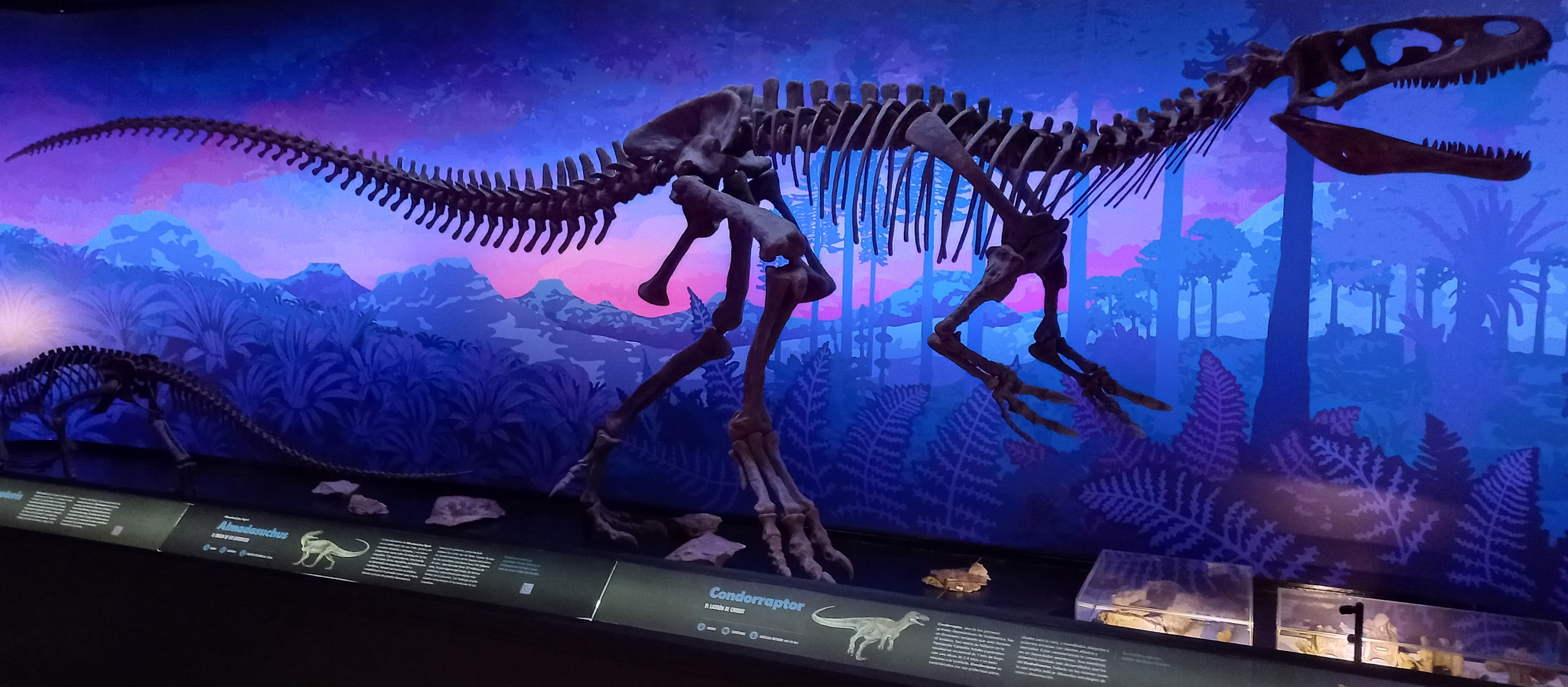
Reconstructed skeleton in Argentina

The most basal clade within Megalosauroidea contains Condorraptor, Marshosaurus, Piatnitzkysaurus and Xuanhanosaurus. The next most basal clade comprises Chuandongocoelurus and Monolophosaurus. However, the affiliation of these clades with Megalosauroidea is poorly supported by tree support metrics, and it is possible that they will be classified outside of Megalosauroidea by future analyses.

- Megalosauroidea
  - - Xuanhanosaurus
    - - Marshosaurus
      - - Condorraptor
        - Piatnitzkysaurus
  - - - Chuandongocoelurus
      - Monolophosaurus
    - Megalosauria
      - Spinosauridae
      - Megalosauridae
