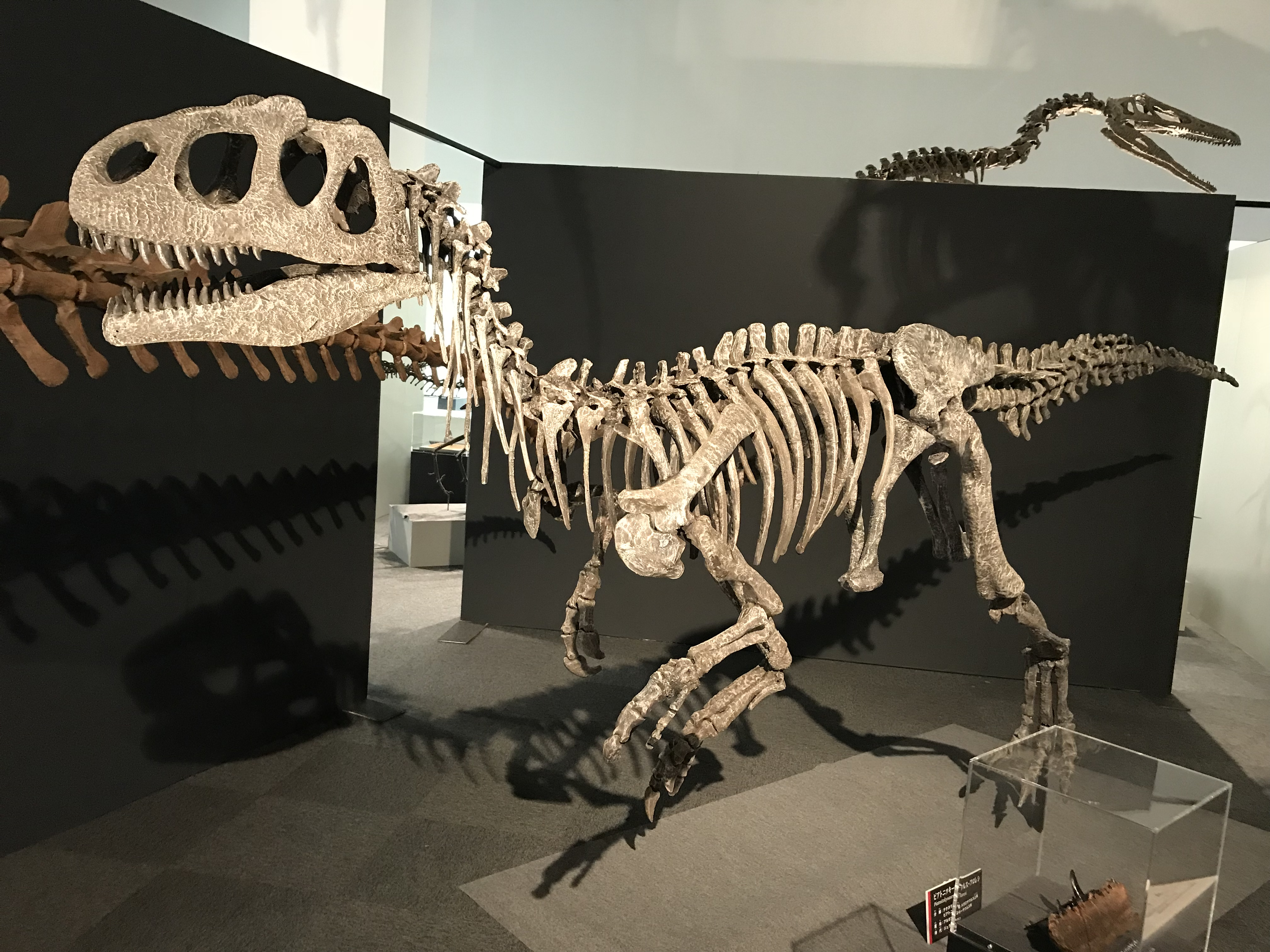
- Skeleton cast

Scientific classification
- Kingdom: Animalia
- Phylum: Chordata
- Class: Reptilia
- Clade: Dinosauria
- Clade: Saurischia
- Clade: Theropoda
- Family: †Piatnitzkysauridae
- Genus: †Piatnitzkysaurus; Bonaparte, 1979
- Species: †P. floresi

Binomial name
- †Piatnitzkysaurus floresi Bonaparte, 1979

Synonyms
- Condorraptor currumili? Rauhut, 2005

= Piatnitzkysaurus =

Piatnitzkysaurus Temporal range: Middle Toarcian ~179.17–178.07 Ma

Extinct genus of dinosaurs

Piatnitzkysaurus (/ˌpiːətnɪtskiːˈsɔːrəs/ pee-ət-NITS-kee-SOR-əs; meaning "Piatnitzky's lizard") is a genus of tetanuran theropod dinosaur that lived approximately 179 to 177 million years ago during the lower part of the Jurassic Period in what is now Argentina. Piatnitzkysaurus was a moderately large, lightly built, bipedal, ground-dwelling carnivore that could grow over 4 m (13.1 ft) long.

== Discovery and naming ==
The holotype specimen of Piatnitzkysaurus, PVL 4073, was collected during expeditions in 1977, 1982, and 1983 at the Cañadón Asfalto Formation in sediments that were deposited during the Middle-Late Toarcian stage of the Jurassic period, approximately 179 to 177 million years ago. The specimen was very complete and is one of the best known from a megalosaur, including a partial skull and partial anterior postcranial skeleton of a subadult individual preserved in semi-articulation. Later in 1986, several bones of an adult individual were referred to the taxon and are the only described material besides the type.

The type species, Piatnitzkysaurus floresi, was described by Jose Bonaparte in 1979. It was named to honor Alejandro Matveievich Piatnitzky (1879–1959), a Russian-born Argentine geologist. In Bonaparte’s 1979 paper on the taxon, he briefly described it along with the sauropods Patagosaurus fariasi (a cetiosaurid)and Volkheimeria chubutensis (an early eusauropod) from the same deposits. It wasn’t until 1986 that Bonaparte fully described the theropod, classifying it in Allosauridae along with Allosaurus, Acrocanthosaurus, Eustreptospondylus, and Dilophosaurus. Piatnitzkysaurus was later reclassified as an abelisaurid, basal carnosaur, basal tetanuran, and non-megalosaurid megalosauroid in phylogenetic analyses, but was classified in its own family in 2012, the Piatnitzkysauridae.

== Description ==
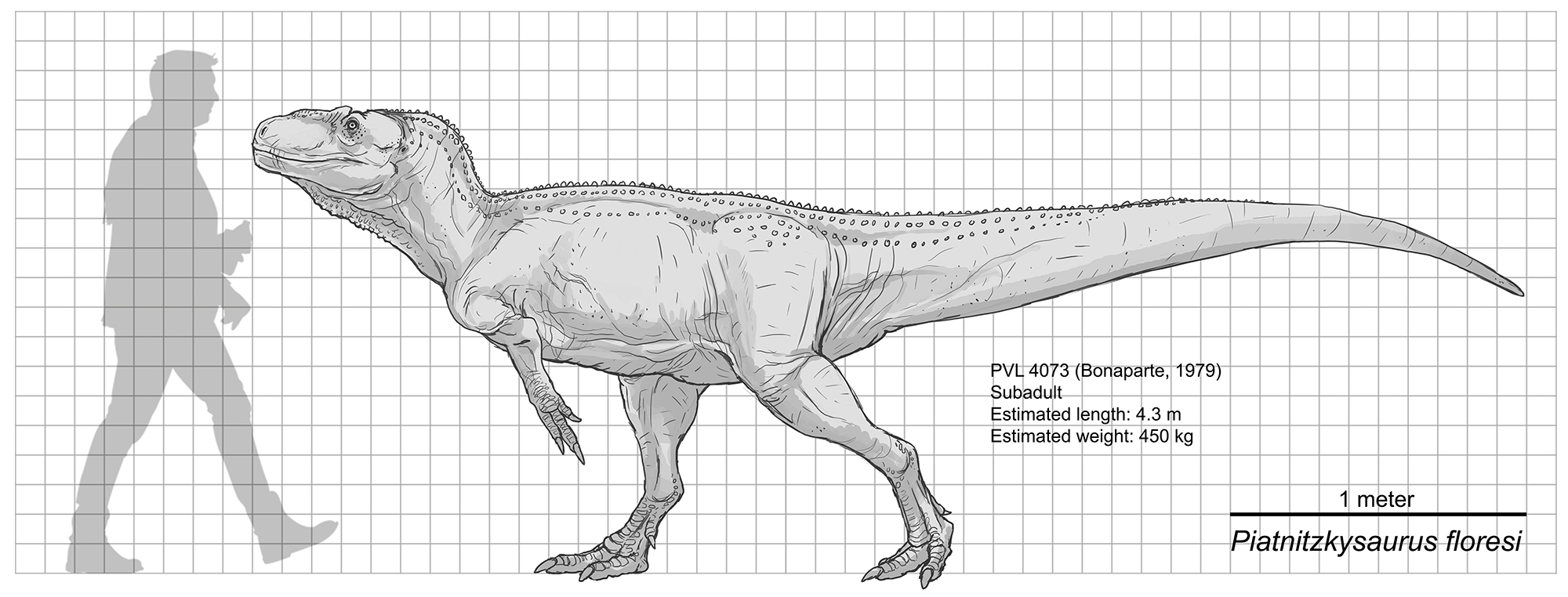
Life restoration and size comparison

In total, two partial skeletons are known (a fractured skull and parts of two postcranial skeletons, among which paratype MACN CH 895) and is the most completely known theropod from the Middle-Late Jurassic Period of the Southern Hemisphere. Piatnitzkysaurus was a relatively lightly built medium-sized bipedal carnivore that was around 4.3 metres (14 ft) long and around 450 kilograms (990 lb) in mass, though such estimates apply to the holotype, which is a subadult. It had robust arms and powerful hind legs with four toes on each foot. Its ischium is 423 millimetres (16.7 in) long. Its braincase resembles that of another megalosauroid, the megalosaurid Piveteausaurus from France.

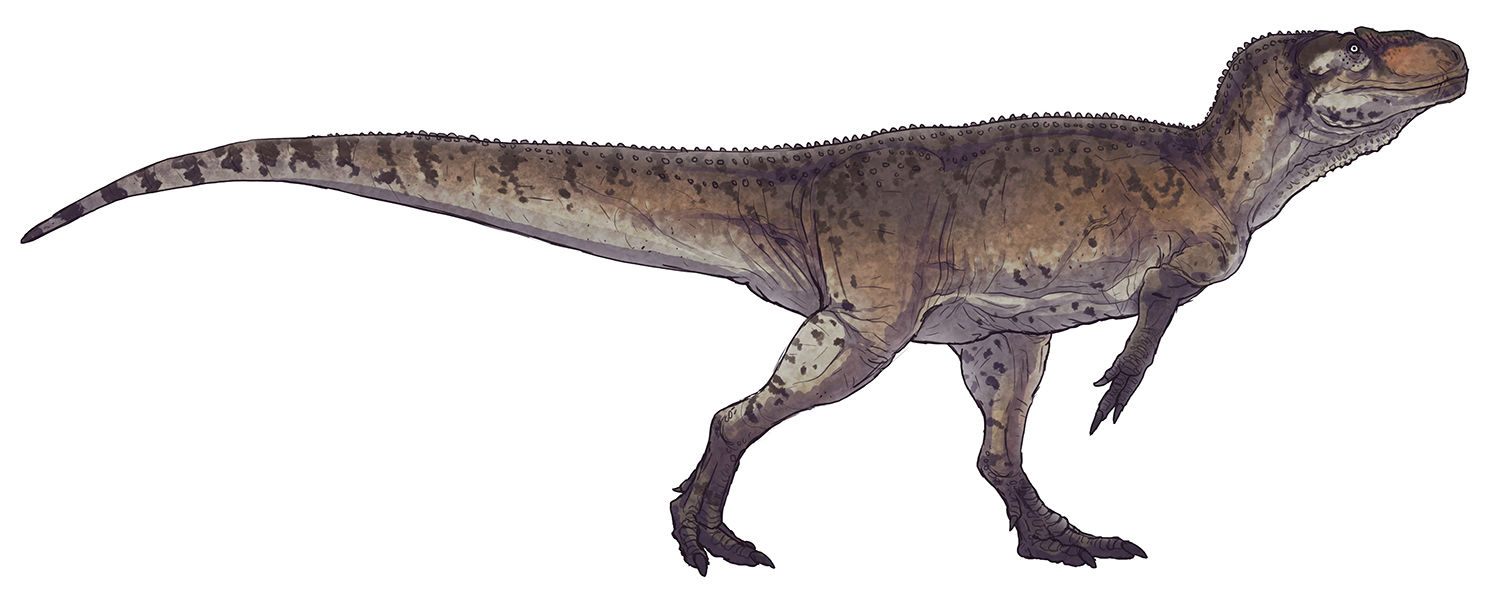
Restoration

A general resemblance to the theropod Allosaurus was noted by Benton (1992); however there are key differences between the two. The scapular blade of Piatnitzkysaurus is shorter and wider than more derived tetanurans. The humerus represents 50 percent of the length of the femur, which is also a primitive condition present among basal theropods. The relative lengths of the ulna in respect to the humerus and femur are also similar to those of basal theropods, which means the forelimbs of Piatnitzkysaurus are proportionally longer than in Allosaurus. Also primitive is the wide contact between the pubis and ischium, a condition that is much different than that of Allosaurus and more derived tetanurans, in which contact is reduced. The pubis of Piatnitzkysaurus also has a distal foot that is more modestly developed than in Allosaurus.

Due to the strong resemblance to Piatnitzkysaurus, it has been suggested that the sister taxa Condorraptor could be better interpreted as the result of individual variation within the species, and not as separate taxa. The main noted differences between the two dinosaurs include both a less well-developed cnemial crest and a first sacral vertebra with a shallower fossa in Condorraptor. However, detailed redescription of the appendicular anatomy of Piatnitzkysaurus revealed many differences between the two taxa.

=== Braincase ===
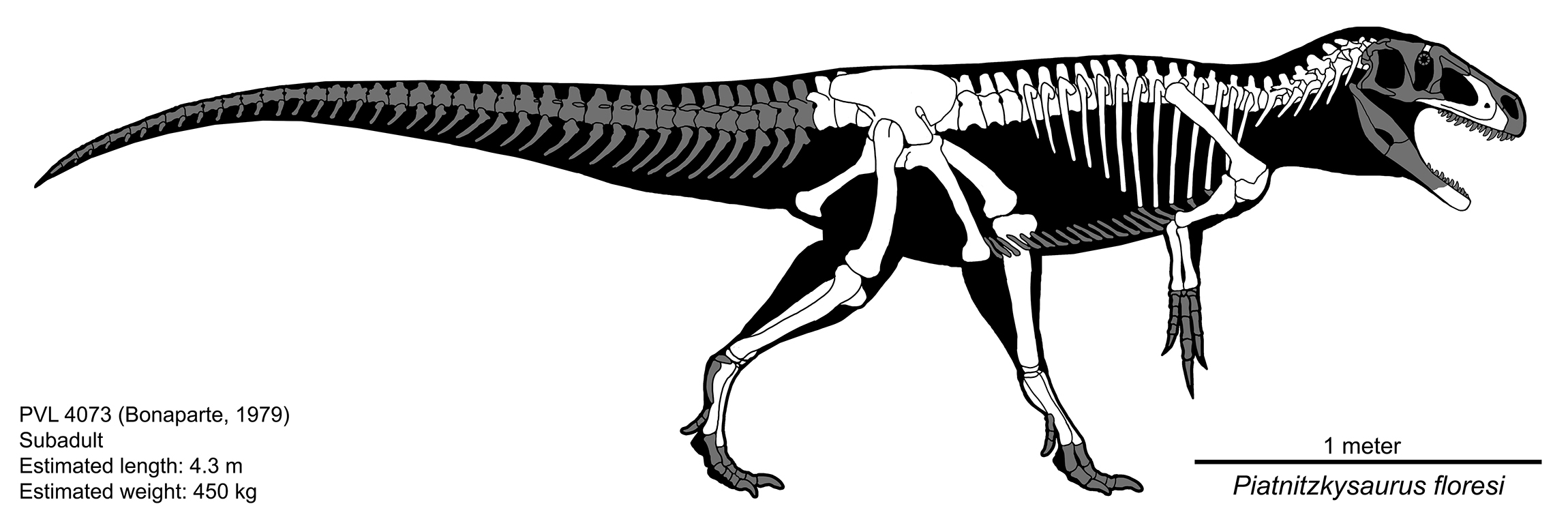
Skeletal diagram

The braincase of Piatnitzkysaurus has been reviewed in detail by Oliver Rauhut; the review constitutes one of the few detailed accounts of braincase morphology in basal theropods. Piatnitzkysaurus is the only member of Piatnitzkysauridae with cranial material preserved, for which two maxillae, a frontal, a braincase, and a partial dentary are known. Piatnitzkysaurus is among the most basal members of the tetanurans and is important for understanding not only Middle Jurassic theropod evolution in the Southern Hemisphere, but also for knowledge of character evolution at the base of tetanurae.

The braincase of the holotype of Piatnitzkysaurus floresi (PVL 4073) is rather well preserved and shows no signs of deformation. The sutures between the individual bones of the skull are only partially visible, which indicates that the holotype represents a subadult individual. This is also consistent with the state of ossification in the post-cranial skeleton. An unusual feature of the braincase is the parasphenoid recess, which has only been described in two other non-avian theropods, Sinovenator and Sinornithosaurus. Given the distant phylogenetic position of the basal tetanuran Piatnitzkysaurus and the advanced maniraptoran and deinonychosaurian taxa Sinovenator and Sinornithosaurus, the presence of this recess represents a convergence and can be considered an autapomorphy of the former genus. Another noteworthy aspect of the braincase is the prominent hook-like basisphenoidal wing, a feature that is also found in other theropods such as Ceratosaurus, Allosaurus, and Tyrannosaurus.

== Classification ==
The most basal clade within Megalosauroidea contains Condorraptor, Marshosaurus, Piatnitzkysaurus and Xuanhanosaurus. The next most basal clade comprises Chuandongocoelurus and Monolophosaurus. However, the affiliation of these clades with Megalosauroidea is poorly supported by tree support metrics, and it is possible that they will be classified outside of Megalosauroidea by future analyses.

- Megalosauroidea
  - - Xuanhanosaurus
    - - Marshosaurus
      - - Condorraptor
        - Piatnitzkysaurus
  - - - Chuandongocoelurus
      - Monolophosaurus
    - Megalosauria
      - Spinosauridae
      - Megalosauridae
