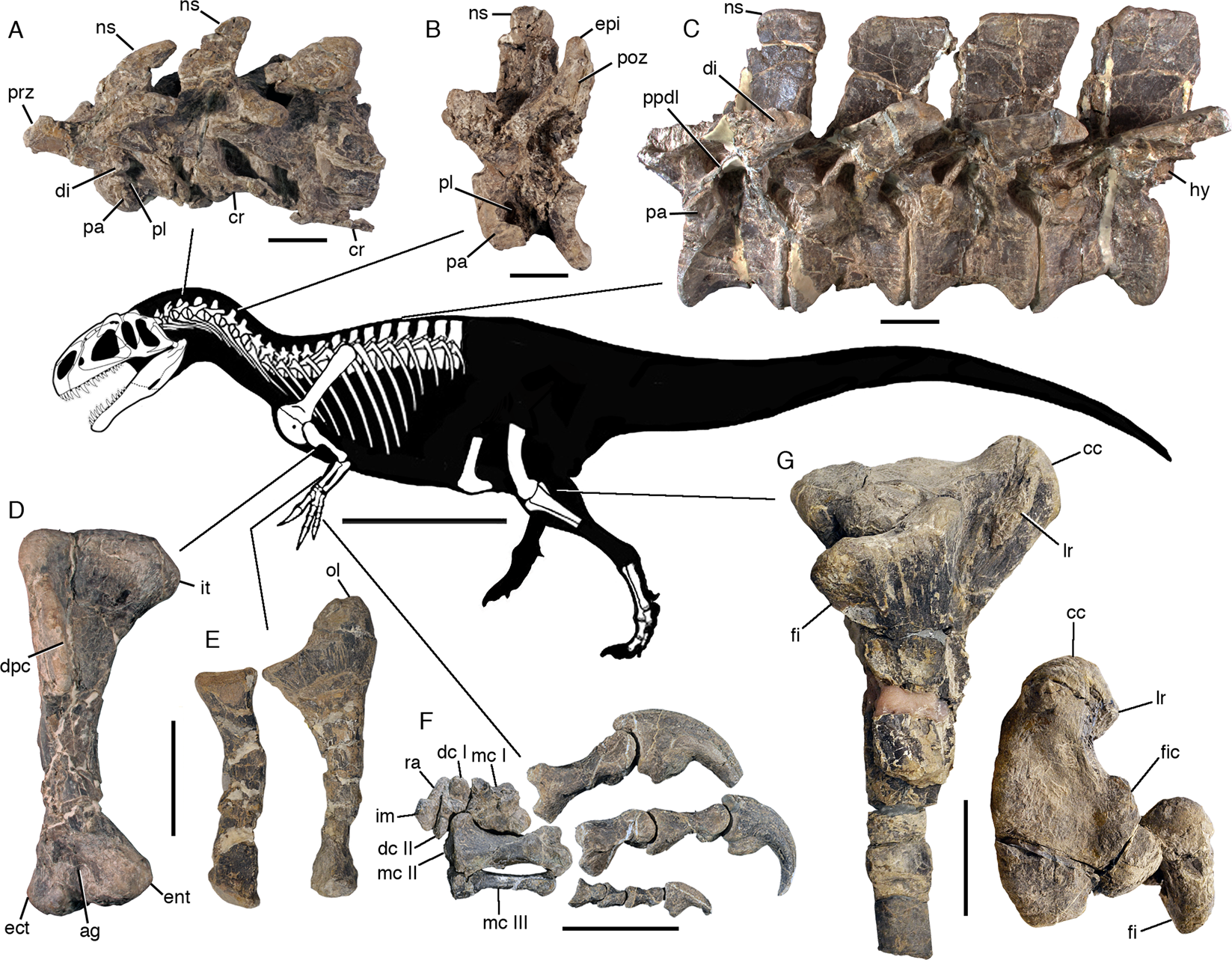

Scientific classification
- Kingdom: Animalia
- Phylum: Chordata
- Class: Reptilia
- Clade: Dinosauria
- Clade: Saurischia
- Clade: Theropoda
- Superfamily: †Allosauroidea
- Genus: †Asfaltovenator; Rauhut & Pol, 2019

Type species
- †Asfaltovenator vialidadi Rauhut & Pol, 2019

= Asfaltovenator =

Asfaltovenator Temporal range: Middle Toarcian~179.17–178.07 Ma

Extinct genus of theropod dinosaur

Asfaltovenator (meaning "Cañadón Asfalto Formation hunter" after the fossil formation in which its fossils were found) is a genus of possibly allosauroid dinosaur from the Lower Jurassic (Middle Toarcian) Cañadón Asfalto Formation of Chubut Province, Argentina. The type and only species is Asfaltovenator vialidadi.

== Discovery ==
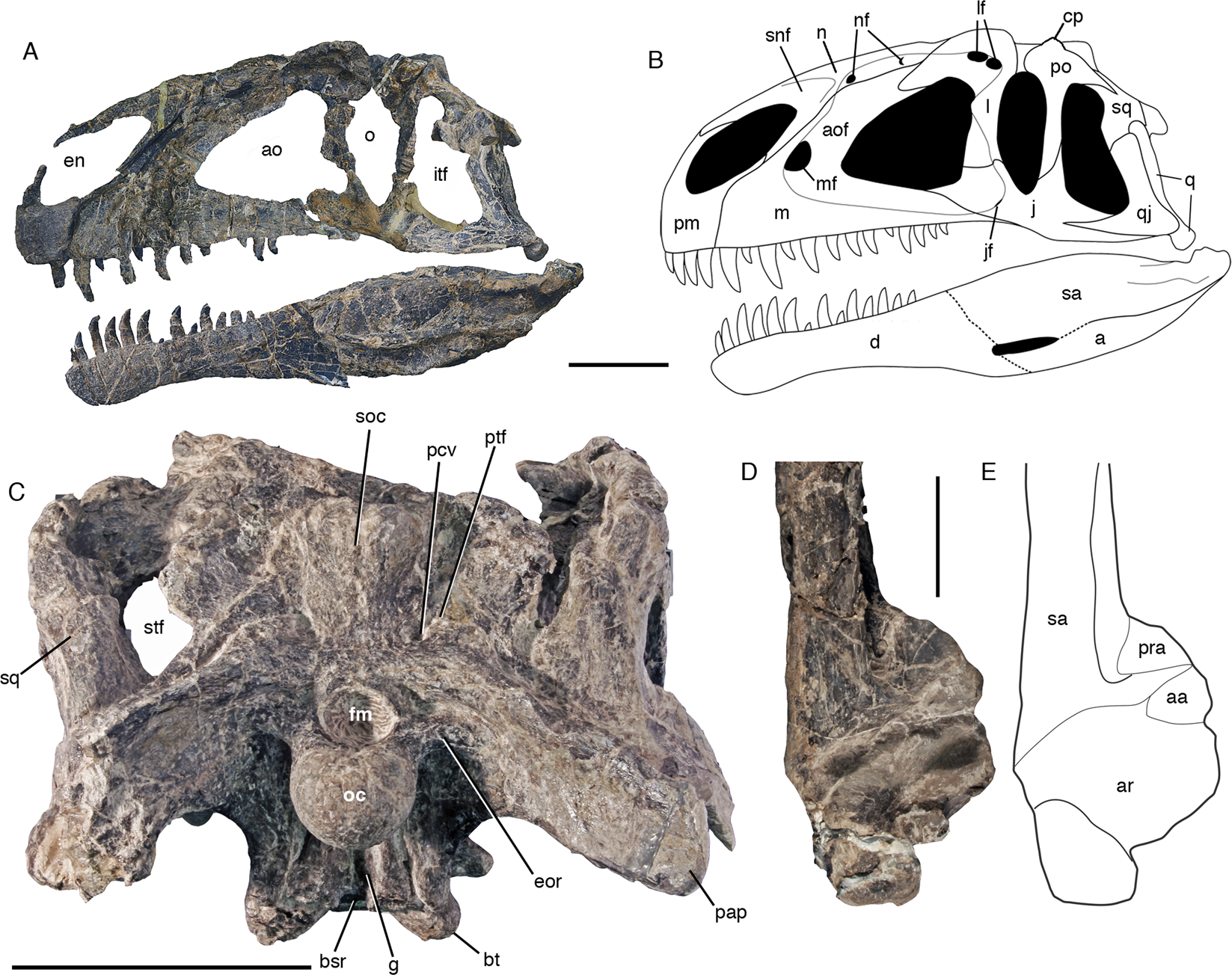
Skull of Asfaltovenator

In 2002, technician Leandro Canesa discovered a theropod skeleton roughly a mile north of Cerro Condor. Excavations started in 2005, and the fossil was removed in its entirety in 2007. It was then prepared by Mariano Caffa, a process that took five years due to the extreme hardness of the stone matrix. Between 2013 and 2015, it was compared with the specimens of related theropods.

In 2019, the type species Asfaltovenator vialidadi was named and described by Oliver Walter Mischa Rauhut and Diego Pol. The generic name combines a reference to the Cañadón Asfalto Formation with the Latin word venator, meaning "hunter". The specific name honours the Dirección Nacional de Vialidad for assisting the Museo Paleontológico "Egidio Feruglio" in recovering the fossil.

Asfaltovenator is only known from the holotype specimen MPEF PV 3440, which was found in a layer of the Cañadón Asfalto Formation which dates to the Middle Toarcian (179-178 million years old). The age was established by using zircon datation, with the location of the specimen being closer to the younger date. The holotype consists of a partial skeleton with a skull, and includes the mostly complete skull and lower jaws and most of the postcranial skeleton in front of the hips, including ten cervical (neck) vertebrae, thirteen dorsal (back) vertebrae and the first sacral vertebra, the complete shoulder girdle minus the furcula, and both forelimbs. The holotype also includes the distal portion of the pubic bones as well as a partial right hindlimb consisting of the distal portion of the femur and proximal portions of the tibia and fibula, and a partial foot.

== Description ==
Size comparison

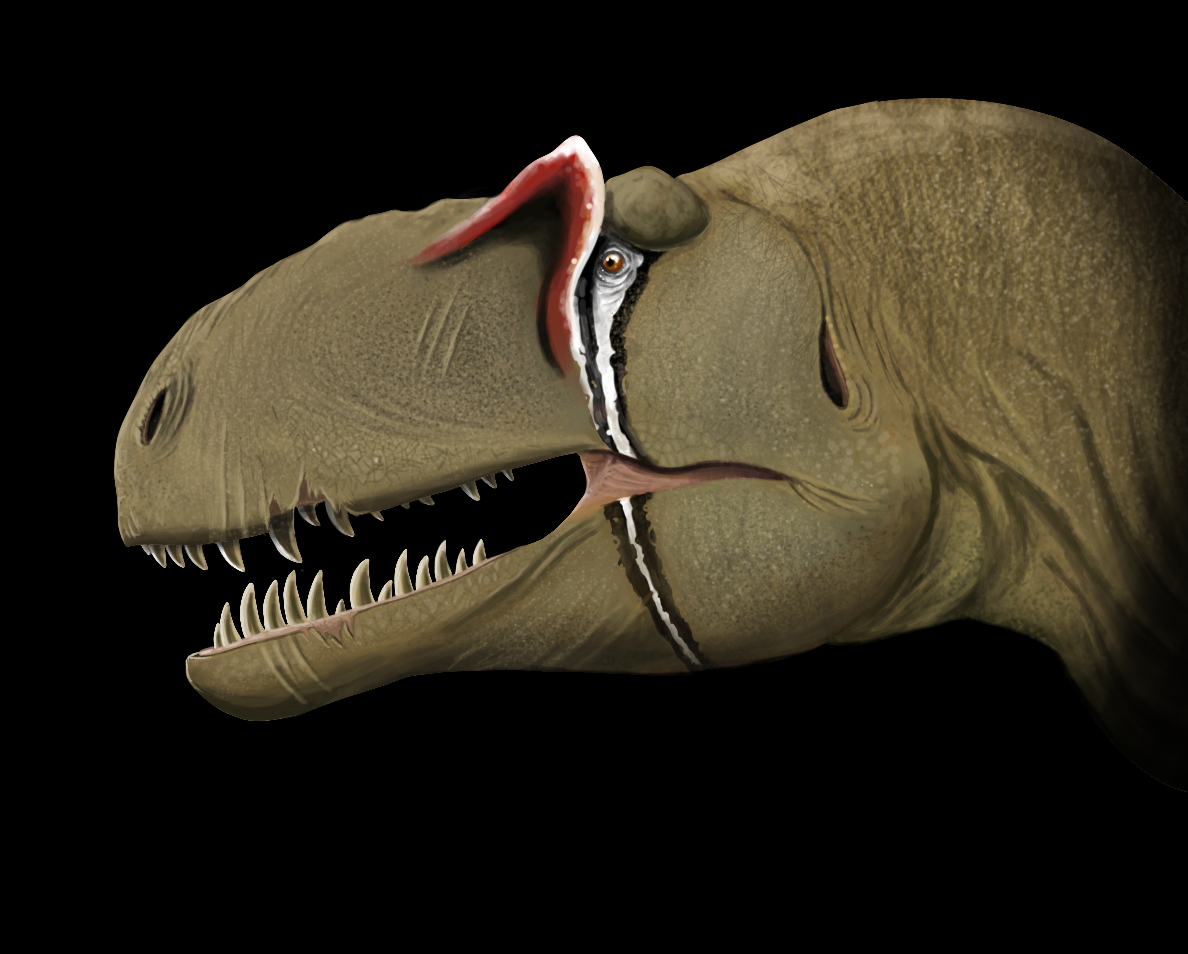
Restoration of the head

Asfaltovenator was a fairly large animal similar in size to Allosaurus, with the holotype skull being 75–80 cm (2.46–2.62 ft) in length and the total body length being estimated at 7–8 m (23–26 ft).

The describers identified several distinctive features, some of which are autapomorphies, seen on the premaxillary teeth serrations and foramen (albeit shared with more basal neotheropods like Dilophosaurus, Dracovenator, and the coelurosaur Proceratosaurus), and on the paradental plates and palatal shelf (also shared with ceratosaurians & others). In the other side it has clear allosauroid features, including on the premaxilla (also recorded in some megalosauroids), the maxilla, or the lacrimal with a supraantorbital crest. The exoccipital bone of the rear skull shows distinctive horizontal ridges between the paraoccipital process and the foramen magnum. On the third and fourth neck vertebrae, the neural spines are triangular and swept backwards. The eleventh and twelfth back vertebrae possess an additional forward ridge on the underside of the diapophysis, the process for the articulation facet of the top rib head.

== Classification ==
Due to Asfaltovenator possessing both primitive and derived characters within Tetanurae, its inclusion in the phylogenetic analysis disrupted current views of tetanuran phylogeny, with the analysis recovering Asfaltovenator as a basal allosauroid between piatnitzkysaurids and metriacanthosaurids, and traditional Megalosauroidea as a paraphyletic grade leading to Allosauroidea. The unique combination of characteristics seen in Asfaltovenator may also indicate that megalosauroids and allosauroids shared a common ancestor not shared with coelurosaurs, another tetanuran group.

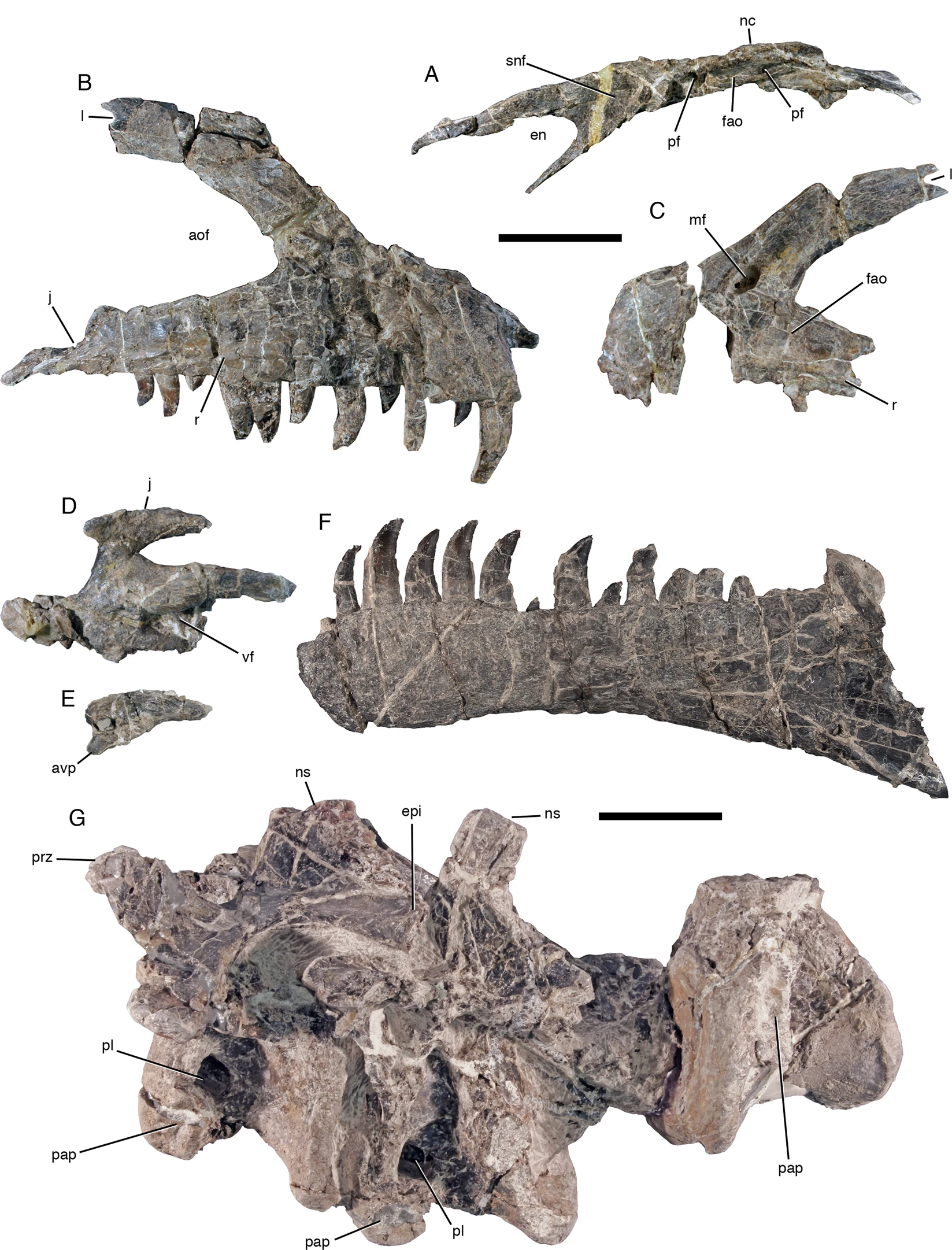
Skull bones and vertebrae

- Carnosauria
  - Spinosauridae
  - - Megalosauridae
    - Allosauroidea
      - Piatnitzkysauridae
      - - - Asfaltovenator
          - - Metriacanthosauridae
            - Allosauria
              - Allosauridae
              - Carcharodontosauria
                - Neovenatoridae
                - Carcharodontosauridae

In 2024, Andrea Cau suggested a different position within Megalosauroidea, as a sister taxon of Sciurumimus and/or within a larger stem group. In the same year, a study by Oliver Rauhut and colleagues included Asfaltovenator within Allosauridae based on their phylogenetic analysis. The ongoing osteology notified also this position, also recovering it in a clade with Allosaurus in some trees or as an early branching allosauroid of some kind. A monophyletic Carnosauria is not recovered, and the other Cañadón Asfalto tetanurans are not closely related to Asfaltovenator. In 2025, the description of Tameryraptor also found Asfaltovenator in Allosauridae in some of their phylogenetic analyses, but this depended on the phylogenetic protocol used.

== Paleoecology ==
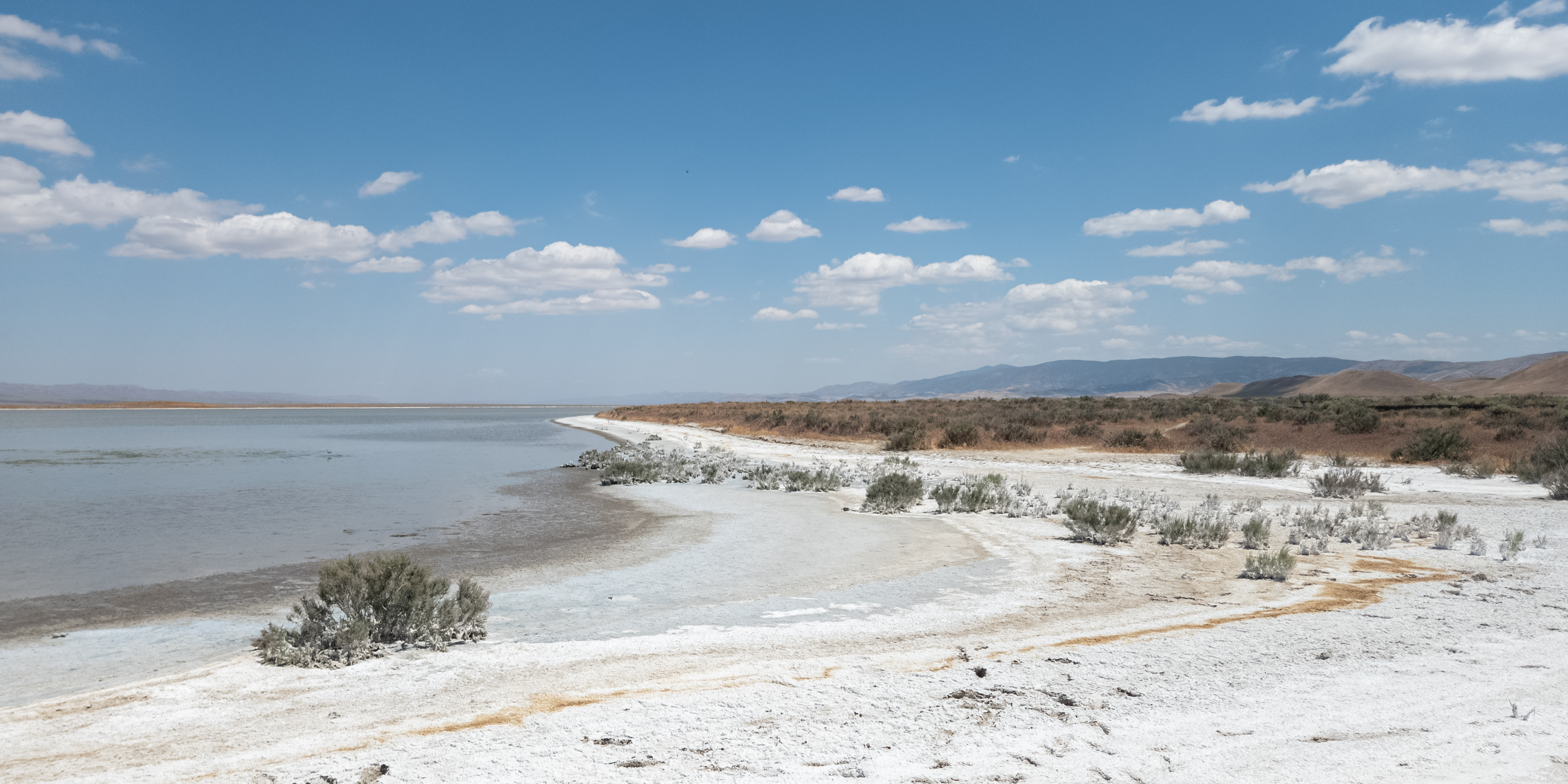
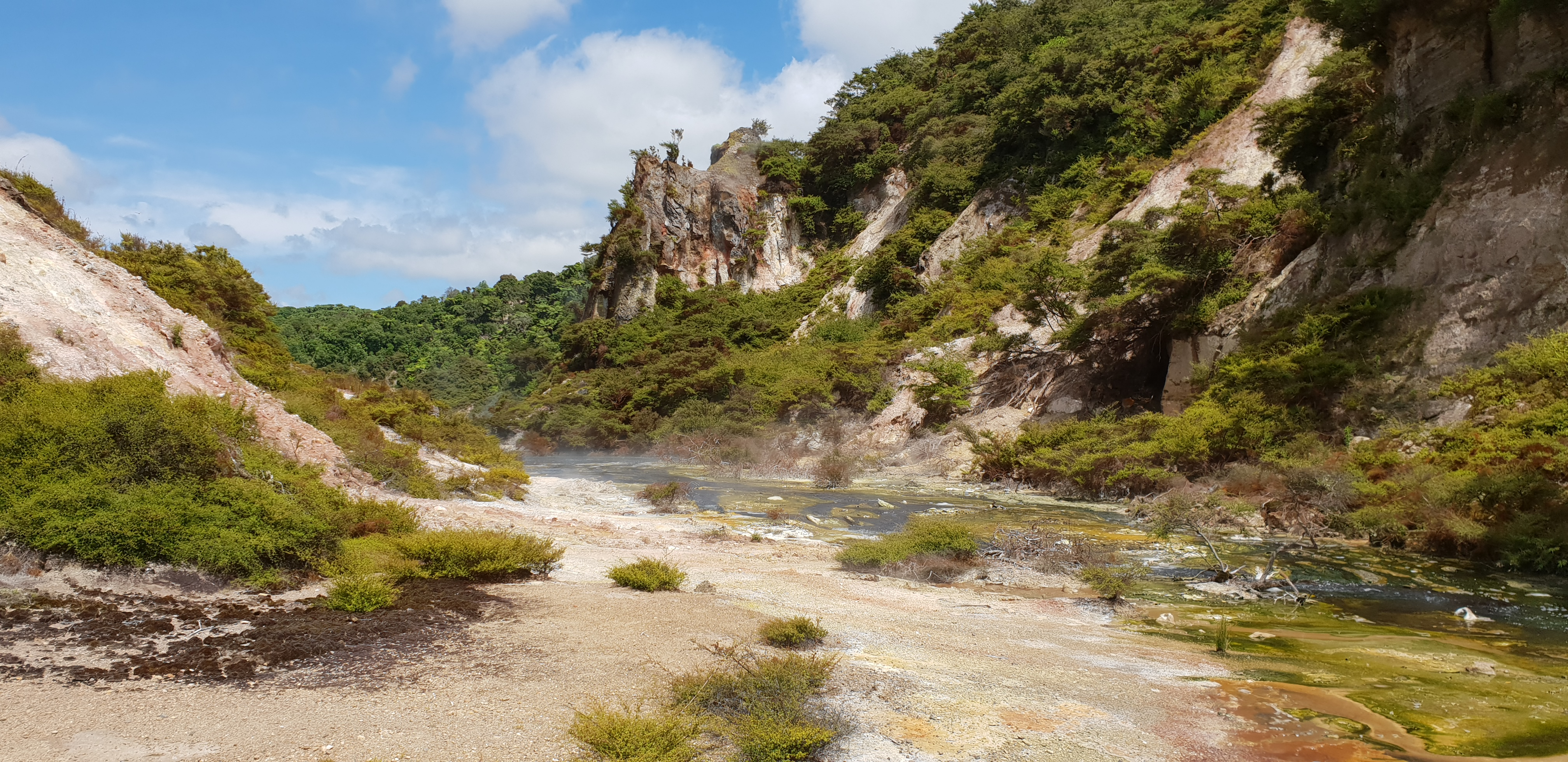
The Chacritas Member hosted volcanic-influenced soda lake (Example from modern California), while nearby environments hosted varied floral belts from coastal Cheirolepidaceous forests to highland Podocarps (Modern Equivalent from New Zealand), a rift area with nearby volcanic influence of the Chon Aike Province

The holotype of Asfaltovenator comes from the Chacritas Member of the Cañadón Asfalto Formation. This member is mostly made up of two major depositional settings: lacustrine and fluvial deposits. Both of these have intervals of tuffaceous materials, suggesting the presence of volcanic activity. Palustrine littoral environment levels are seen at Cerro Cóndor and Estancia Fossati, characterized by the presence of lacustrine limestones interbedded with shales, tuffs and sandstones. The lacustrine section has been called the "Chacritas Paleolake", and seems to have been a rather saline or even hypersaline hydrologically closed pan lake, shallow in depth, with marginal zones and palustrine subenvironments made of low-energy ramp-like margins.

The Toarcian Oceanic Anoxic Event (TOAE), recently been recognized as a key driver of Jurassic dinosaur evolution, linked to volcanic eruptions in the Karoo-Ferrar region that caused multiple extinction pulses. While well-studied in marine invertebrates, the event's impact on terrestrial vertebrates, particularly tetanuran theropods, is less understood. However, evidence suggests the TOAE triggered rapid diversification in these groups as seen with the presence of Asfaltovenator and other Averostrans in Middle Toarcian strata. This surge in morphological evolution, followed by a decline in the Middle Jurassic, aligns with patterns seen after other extinction events. Ecological release after the TOAE likely facilitated this rapid evolution, though reconstructing lineage relationships is challenging due to high homoplasy and incomplete fossil records.
