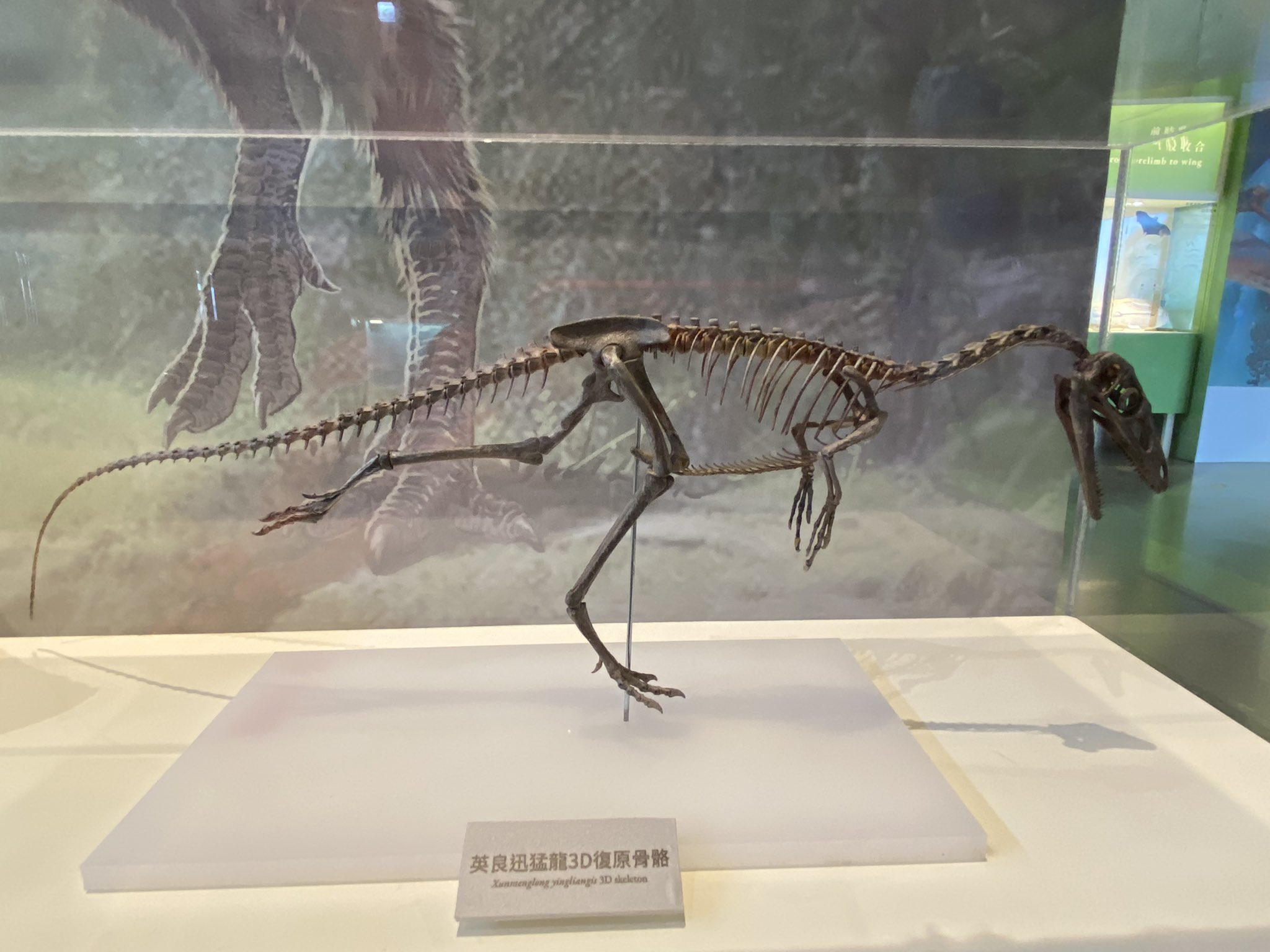
- Reconstructed skeleton

Scientific classification
- Kingdom: Animalia
- Phylum: Chordata
- Class: Reptilia
- Clade: Dinosauria
- Clade: Saurischia
- Clade: Theropoda
- Family: †Compsognathidae
- Genus: †Xunmenglong; Xing et al., 2020

Type species
- †Xunmenglong yinliangis Xing et al., 2020

= Xunmenglong =

Xunmenglong Temporal range: Early Cretaceous, Hauterivian 130.7 Ma

Extinct genus of dinosaurs

Xunmenglong (from Chinese: 迅猛龍/迅猛龙; pinyin: Xùnměnglóng; lit. 'swift fierce dragon') is a genus of compsognathid theropod dinosaur from the Huajiying Formation of Hebei Province, China. The type and only species is Xunmenglong yinliangis. The holotype material consists of a pelvis, tail base and hindlimbs that had previously been part of a chimera containing three different animals. The animal is described as being the smallest known member of Compsognathidae, being about the size of the sub-adult Scipionyx holotype specimen, or approximately 50 centimetres (1.6 ft) in length.

== Classification ==
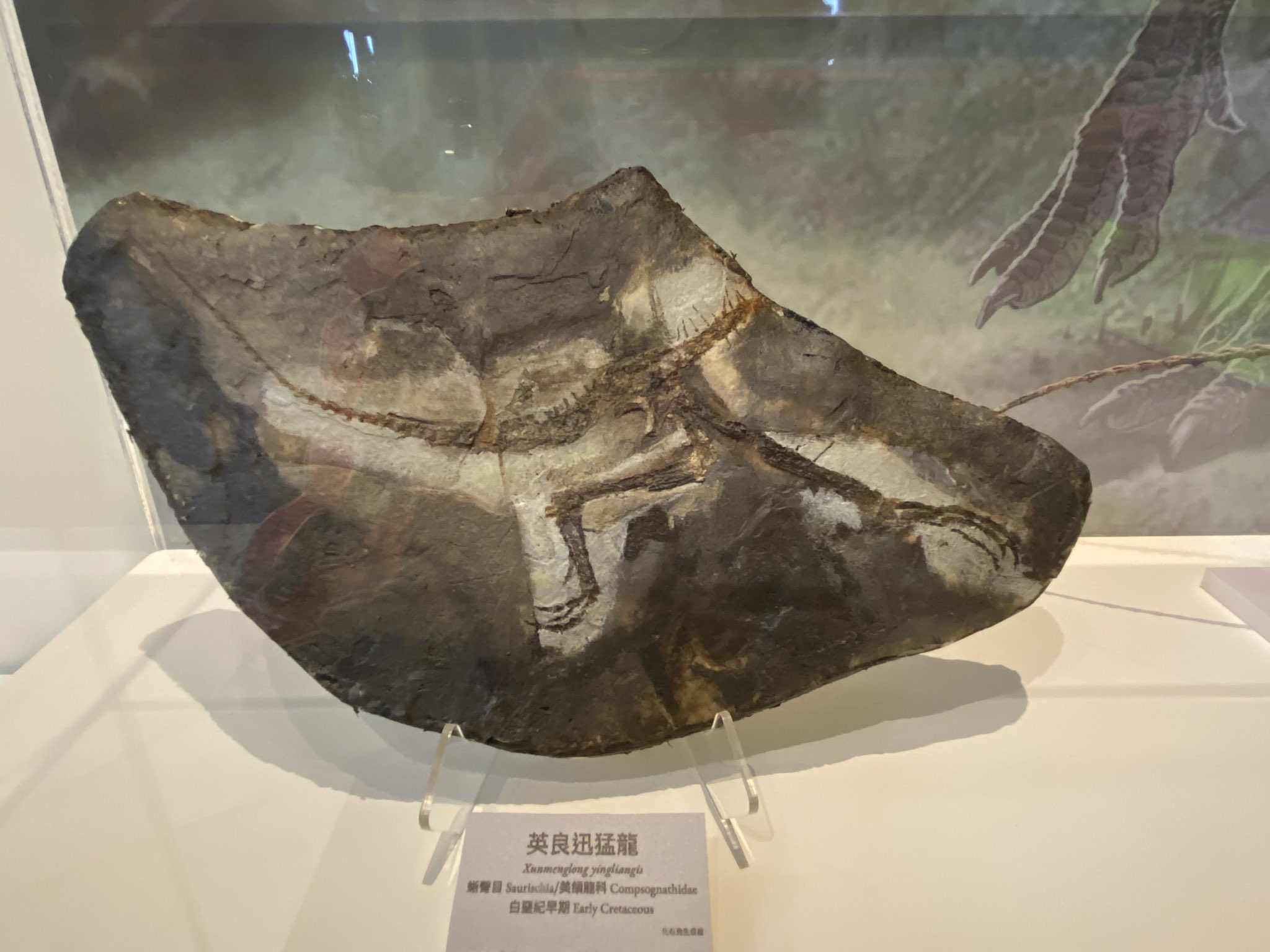
Holotype fossil

In the original description, Xunmenglong is recovered as a compsognathid in a polytomy including Compsognathus, Huaxiagnathus, and Juravenator. However, Andrea Cau (2024) recovered Xunmenglong not as a compsognathid, but instead as a basal member of Tetanurae.
