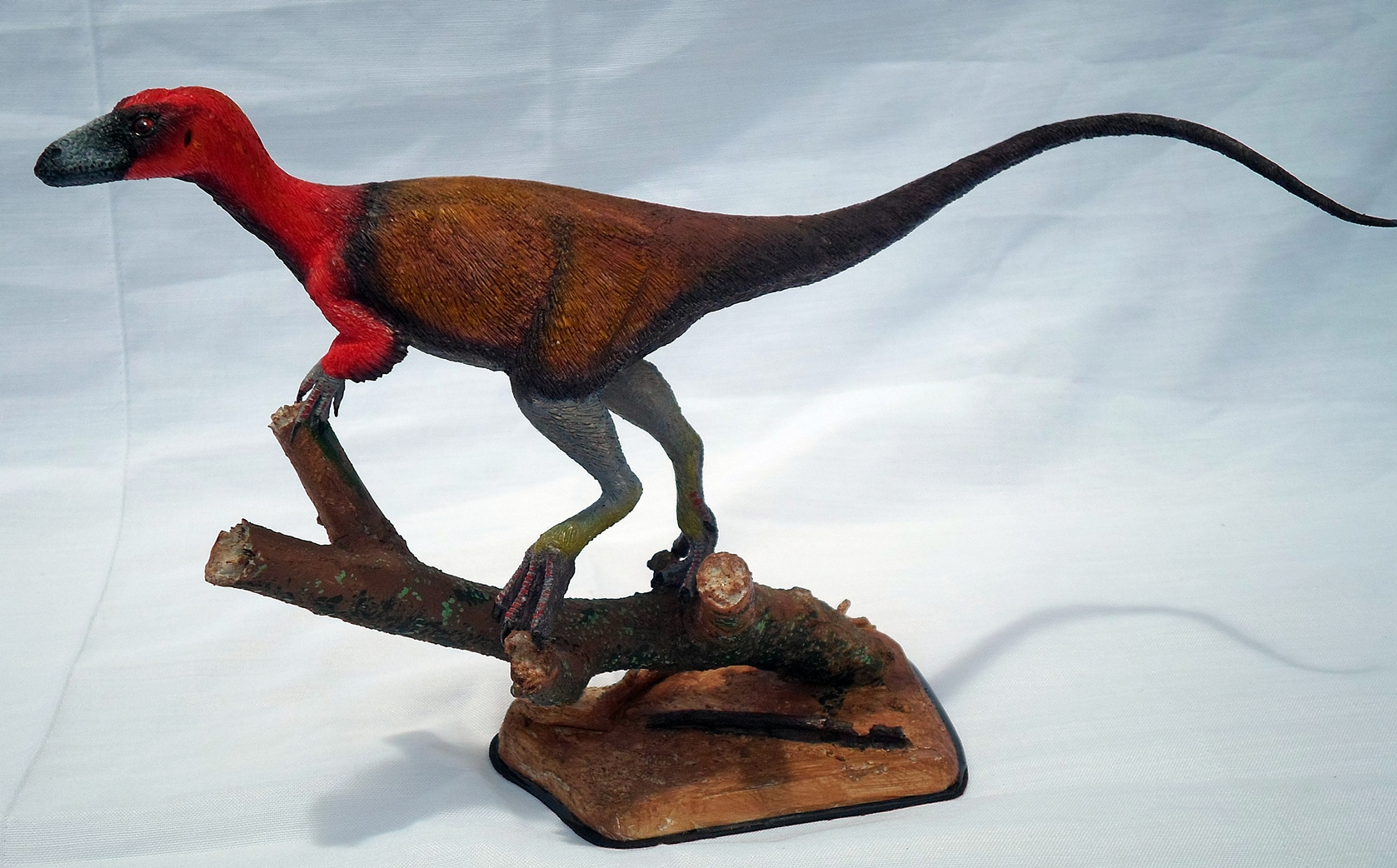
- Hypothetical model

Scientific classification
- Kingdom: Animalia
- Phylum: Chordata
- Class: Reptilia
- Clade: Dinosauria
- Clade: Saurischia
- Clade: Theropoda
- Clade: Maniraptoromorpha
- Genus: †Mirischia; Naish et al., 2004
- Species: †M. asymmetrica

Binomial name
- †Mirischia asymmetrica Naish et al., 2004

= Mirischia =

Mirischia Temporal range: Early Cretaceous, 108 Ma

Genus of theropod dinosaurs

Mirischia is an extinct genus of coelurosaurian theropod dinosaur from the Albian stage (Early Cretaceous Period) of northeastern Brazil.

== Discovery and naming ==
In 2000 David Martill and Eberhard Frey reported the find of a small dinosaur fossil present in a chalk nodule, illegally acquired by the German Staatliches Museum für Naturkunde Karlsruhe from an illegal Brazilian fossil dealer who had indicated the piece had been uncovered in the Chapada do Araripe, specifically at Araripina, Pernambuco. In 2004 the type species Mirischia asymmetrica was named and described by Martill, Frey and Darren Naish. The generic name combines the Latin mirus, 'wonderful', with "ischia", the Latinised plural of Greek ἴσχιον, ischion, 'hip joint'. The specific name asymmetrica refers to the fact that in the specimen the left ischium differs from its right counterpart.

The holotype, SMNK 2349 PAL, has its probable provenance in the Romualdo Formation of the Santana Group, dating from the Albian. It consists of a partial articulated skeleton, largely consisting of the pelvis and incomplete hind limbs, including two posterior dorsal vertebrae, a rib, gastralia, partial ilia, pubes and ischia, partial thigh bones and the upper parts of the right tibia and fibula. In front of the pubes, a piece of a petrified intestine is present. The specimen represents a subadult individual.

== Description ==
Mirischia was a small bipedal predator. Its length was in 2004 estimated at 2.1 metres (6.8 feet). In 2010 Gregory S. Paul estimated the weight at seven kilogrammes (15.4 pounds). The holotype of Mirischia is notable for having asymmetrical ischia. Quoting from Naish et al. (2004): "The ischia of Mirischia are asymmetrical, that on the left being perforated by an oval foramen while that on the right has an open notch in the same position." The specimen is also unusual in that it preserves some soft tissue remains: apart from the intestine, what the describers interpreted to have been an air sac was preserved between its pubic and ischial bones in the form of a vacuity. Previous workers had suggested that non-avian theropods might — like birds — possess post-cranial air sacs, and Mirischia seems to confirm that. Another notable trait is the exceptional thinness of the bone wall of all skeletal elements.

== Phylogeny ==
In 2004 Mirischia was assigned to the Compsognathidae, as closely related to Compsognathus from the Upper Jurassic of Europe and Aristosuchus from the Lower Cretaceous of England. It would then be the only compsognathid known from the Americas. In 2010 Naish suggested it may have instead been a basal member of the Tyrannosauroidea. In 2024, Andrea Cau published a study on the phylogenetics of compsognathids that recovered Mirischia, along with four other proposed compsognathids in a polytomy within basal Coelurosauria. This polytomy notably did not include Compsognathus proper, which would make none of these species compsognathids.

This is a simplified version of the phylogeny by Cau (2024), with Mirischia in bold.

- Tetanurae
  - - Siamraptor
    - Siamotyrannus
  - Orionides
    - - Streptospondylus
      - Xuanhanosaurus
      - Poekilopleuron
      - Piveteausaurus
      - Piatnitzkysaurus
      - Marshosaurus
      - Leshansaurus
      - Eustreptospondylus
      - Condorraptor
      - Asfaltovenator
      - - Sciurumimus
        - Nedcolbertia
        - Magnosaurus
        - Duriavenator
        - Afrovenator
        - - Compsognathus longipes
          - Compsognathus corallestris
          - Torvosaurus tanneri
          - Torvosaurus gurneyi
          - Megalosaurus
          - - Scipionyx
            - Wiehenvenator
            - Iberospinus
            - - Baryonychinae
              - Spinosaurinae
    - Avetheropoda
      - Allosauroidea (Incl. Juravenator at an indeterminate position)
      - Coelurosauria
        - Sinosauropteryx
        - Sinocalliopteryx
        - **Mirischia**
        - Huaxiagnathus
        - Zuolong
        - Tyrannoraptora
          - Maniraptoromorpha
          - - NGMC 2124
            - Tanycolagreus
            - Stokesosaurus
            - Juratyrant
            - Eutyrannosauria

In 2025, Qiu and colleagues argued against the monophyly of Compsognathidae and included Mirischia within Sinosauropterygidae, a family containing all compsognathid-like theropods from the Jehol Biota of China. In their comprehensive revision of Santanaraptor and Mirischia, Delcourt et al. (2025) recovered the latter as a maniraptoromorph in different positions: as an ornithomimosaurian based on equal weight phylogenetic analyses and as an early branching maniraptoromorph based on implied weight phylogenetic analyses, forming a clade with Santanaraptor, Tanycolagreus and Juratyrant. Neither analytical method supports a placement of Mirischia within tyrannosauroids or compsognathids.
