= Beipiaognathus =

Beipiaognathus Temporal range: Early Cretaceous, ~125–121 Ma

Scientific classification
- Kingdom: Animalia
- Phylum: Chordata
- Class: Reptilia
- Clade: Dinosauria
- Clade: Saurischia
- Clade: Theropoda
- Family: †Compsognathidae
- Genus: †Beipiaognathus; Hu et al., 2016
- Species: †B. jii

Binomial name
- †Beipiaognathus jii Hu et al., 2016

Extinct species of reptile

Beipiaognathus (meaning Beipiao jaw) is a dubious genus of coelurosaurian theropod from the Early Cretaceous Yixian Formation of Liaoning, China. The type species is Beipiaognathus jii and it was named and described by Hu et al. in 2016.

The genus was initially assigned to the Compsognathidae by Hu et al. (2016) based on the presence of two traits: fan-shaped dorsal neural spines and a robust I-1 phalanx on the hand. However, it also differs from other compsognathids in several ways: the teeth are unserrated and conical; the ulna is proportionally longer; the II-1 phalanx on the hand is longer and more robust; and the tail is much shorter.

However, Andrea Cau informally noted a number of points in the fossil that are indicative of it having been artificially assembled, thus rendering the specimen a phylogenetically uninformative chimaera. Additionally, he argued that the characters cited are not unique to compsognathids, with fan-shaped neural spines being also seen in ornithomimosaurs and the troodontid Sinovenator, and the robust I-1 phalanx also being seen in alvarezsaurids. He also argued that in one case, there has been reportedly found a coracoid in the tail, but maybe that was the way it died, or it belonged to another dinosaur separate from Beipiaognathus.

The chimeric status of Beipiaognathus was noted in the literature for the first time by Xing et al. in 2020, in their description of Xunmenglong.
