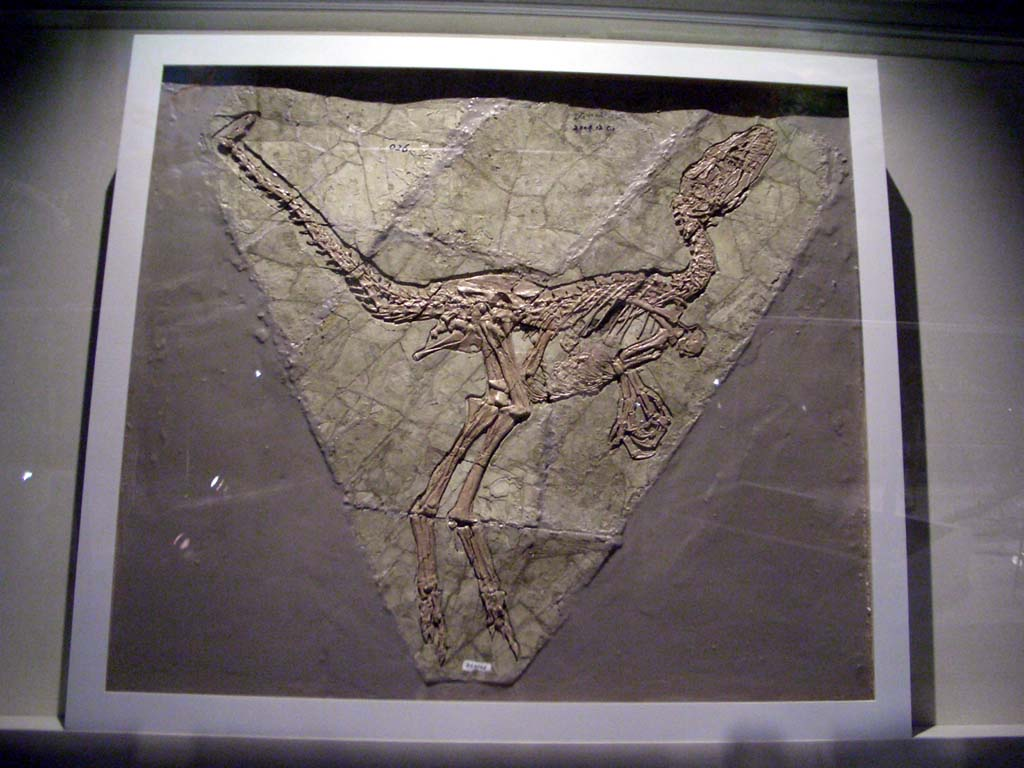
- Huaxiagnathus fossil displayed in Hong Kong Science Museum

Scientific classification
- Kingdom: Animalia
- Phylum: Chordata
- Class: Reptilia
- Clade: Dinosauria
- Clade: Saurischia
- Clade: Theropoda
- Family: †Compsognathidae
- Genus: †Huaxiagnathus; Hwang et al., 2004
- Species: †H. orientalis

Binomial name
- †Huaxiagnathus orientalis Hwang et al., 2004

Synonyms
- Sinotyrannus? Ji et al., 2009

= Huaxiagnathus =

Huaxiagnathus Temporal range: Early Cretaceous (Barremian) 125.46 Ma

Extinct genus of dinosaurs

Huaxiagnathus is an extinct genus of coelurosaurian theropod dinosaur from the Lower Cretaceous of China. The genus contains a single species, Huaxiagnathus orientalis, known from two immature individuals from the Yixian Formation. Huaxiagnathus may represent an earlier ontogenetic stage of the tyrannosauroid Sinotyrannus from the younger Jiufotang Formation.

== Etymology ==
The name Huaxiagnathus is derived from the Chinese Hua Xia, 華夏, a traditional word for "China", and from the Greek gnathos, Latinised into gnathus, meaning "jaw."

== Description ==
Scale diagram of the two known specimens with a human (holotype in green)

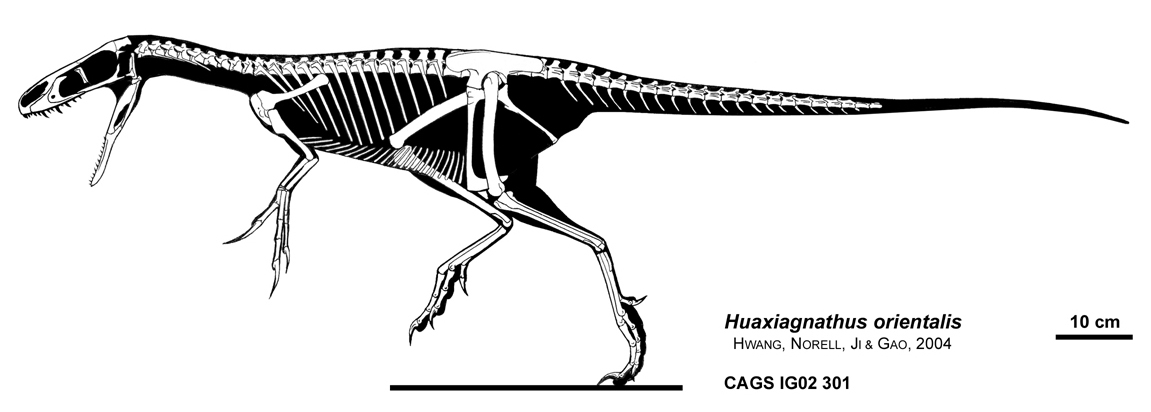
Skeletal diagram

The holotype (CAGS-IG-02-301, Chinese Academy of Geological Sciences, Beijing) specimen was collected from the Yixian Formation (Barremian stage, 125 million years ago) at Dabangou Village, Sihetun area, near Beipiao City, in western Liaoning Province. The holotype is a subadult and consists of an essentially complete skeleton, lacking only the end of the tail, preserved on five large slabs. Partially digested bones of an unidentified vertebrate were found within the holotype specimen. A larger, ontogenetically older specimen of Huaxiagnathus was discovered earlier in the Yixian Formation of the Sihetun area (NGMC 98-5-003, National Geological Museum of China, Beijing), but damage and mistakes made during its preparation rendered it unsuitable as a holotype.

The known Huaxiagnathus specimens are larger than the related Sinosauropteryx, with the largest specimen about 1.8 meters (5.9 feet) in length.

Hwang et al. diagnosed this genus as follows: differing from all other known compsognathids in having a very long posterior process of the premaxilla that overlaps the antorbital fossa, a manus equal to the combined lengths of the humerus and radius, large manual unguals I and II which are subequal in length and 167% the length of manual ungual III, a first metacarpal which has a smaller proximal transverse width than the second metacarpal, and the presence of a reduced olecranon process on the ulna.

== Phylogeny ==
In their 2004 description of Huaxiagnathus, Hwang et al. recovered it as the basalmost known compsognathid, as indicated by its unspecialized forearm.

In 2024, Andrea Cau published a study on the phylogenetics of compsognathids and immature theropods in general that called the assessment of Huaxiagnathus—known only from immature specimens—within Compsognathidae into question. The paper recovered the taxon, along with four other proposed compsognathids in a polytomy within basal Coelurosauria. This polytomy notably did not include Compsognathus proper, which would make none of these species compsognathids.

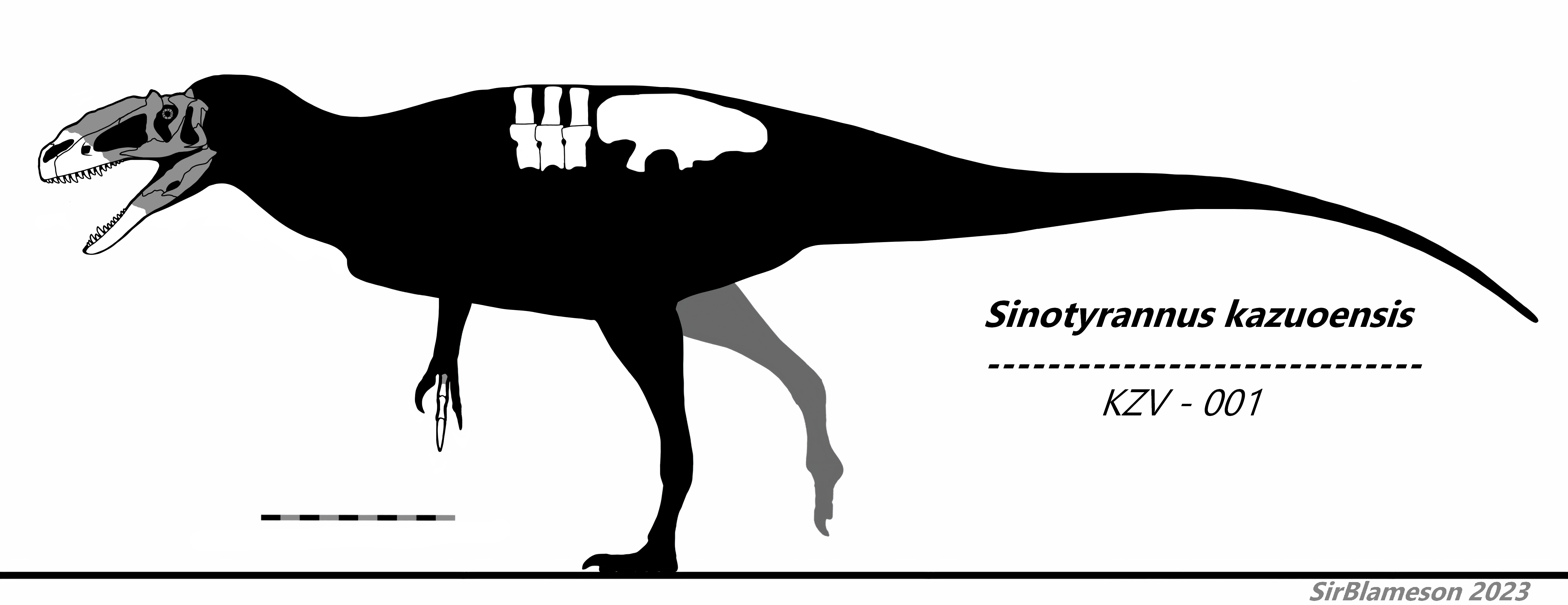
Reconstructed skeleton of Sinotyrannus, a possible mature form and junior synonym of Huaxiagnathus

Using an updated version of this matrix, Cau and Paterna (2025) determined that Sinotyrannus, a large coeval tyrannosauroid known from a specimen of an adult individual, was a mature form of Huaxiagnathus. Both species share a dorsally convex ilium with a short preacetabular process without an anteroventral hook. Other differences observed between the two species are likely the result of differences in body size and ontogenetic stage, consistent with the more established growth series of other tyrannosauroids like Tyrannosaurus. Since Huaxiagnathus was named before Sinotyrannus, this genus name holds priority, making Sinotyrannus a junior synonym of the former.

Qiu et al. (2025) also argued against the monophyly of Compsognathidae using Cau's dataset and revised the definition of the monophyletic Sinosauropterygidae within Coelurosauria as a family containing all compsognathid-like theropods from the Jehol Biota of China: Sinosauropteryx, Huadanosaurus, Huaxiagnathus and Sinocalliopteryx, in addition to the Brazilian Mirischia. Their phylogenetic analyses are reproduced below:

Topology A: OSP dataset

- - Sinosauropterygidae
    - - Sinosauropteryx lingyuanensis
      - Sinosauropteryx prima
    - - Huaxiagnathus orientalis
      - - Huadanosaurus sinensis
        - - Mirischia asymmetrica
          - Sinocalliopteryx gigas
  - - Tyrannosauroidea
    - Other maniraptoriforms

Topology B: TWiG dataset

- - Tyrannosauroidea
  - - Sinosauropterygidae
      - - Mirischia asymmetrica
        - - Huaxiagnathus orientalis
          - Sinocalliopteryx gigas
      - - Juravenator starki
        - - Huadanosaurus sinensis
          - - Compsognathus longipes
            - - Sinosauropteryx lingyuanensis
              - Sinosauropteryx prima
    - - Other maniraptoriforms
