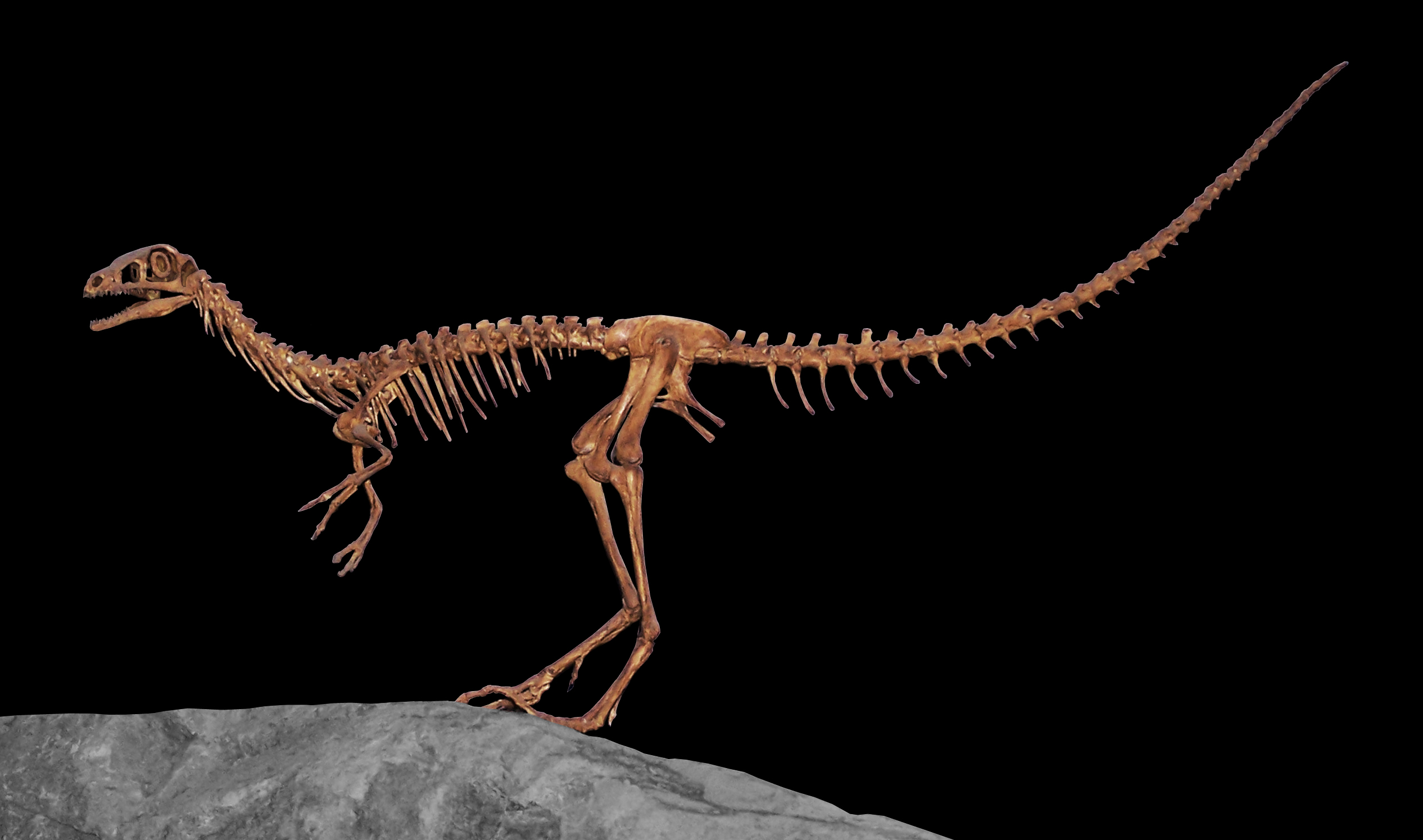
- Reconstructed skeleton at the Museum of Ancient Life

Scientific classification
- Kingdom: Animalia
- Phylum: Chordata
- Class: Reptilia
- Clade: Dinosauria
- Clade: Saurischia
- Clade: Theropoda
- Family: †Compsognathidae
- Subfamily: †Compsognathinae; Cope, 1875
- Genus: †Compsognathus; Wagner, 1859

Type species
- †Compsognathus longipes Wagner, 1859

Synonyms
- Compsognathus corallestris Bidar et al., 1972

= Compsognathus =

Compsognathus Temporal range: Late Jurassic, 150.8–145 Ma

Genus of dinosaurs

Compsognathus (/kɒmpˈsɒɡnəθəs/; Greek kompsos/κομψός; "elegant", "refined" or "dainty", and gnathos/γνάθος; "jaw") is a genus of small, bipedal, carnivorous theropod dinosaur. Members of its single species Compsognathus longipes could grow to around the size of a chicken. They lived about 150 million years ago, during the Tithonian age of the late Jurassic period, in what is now Europe. Paleontologists have found two well-preserved fossils, one in Germany in the 1850s and the second in France more than a century later. Today, C. longipes is the only recognized species, although the French specimen was once thought to belong to a separate species named C. corallestris.

Many presentations still describe Compsognathus as "chicken-sized" dinosaurs because of the size of the German specimen, which is now believed to be a juvenile. Compsognathus longipes is one of the few dinosaur species whose diet is known with certainty: the remains of small, agile lizards are preserved in the bellies of both specimens. Teeth discovered in Portugal may be further fossil remains of the genus.

Although not recognized as such at the time of its discovery, Compsognathus is the first theropod dinosaur known from a reasonably complete fossil skeleton. Until the 1990s, it was the smallest-known non-avialan dinosaur, with the preceding centuries incorrectly labelling it as the closest relative of Archaeopteryx.

== Discovery and species ==
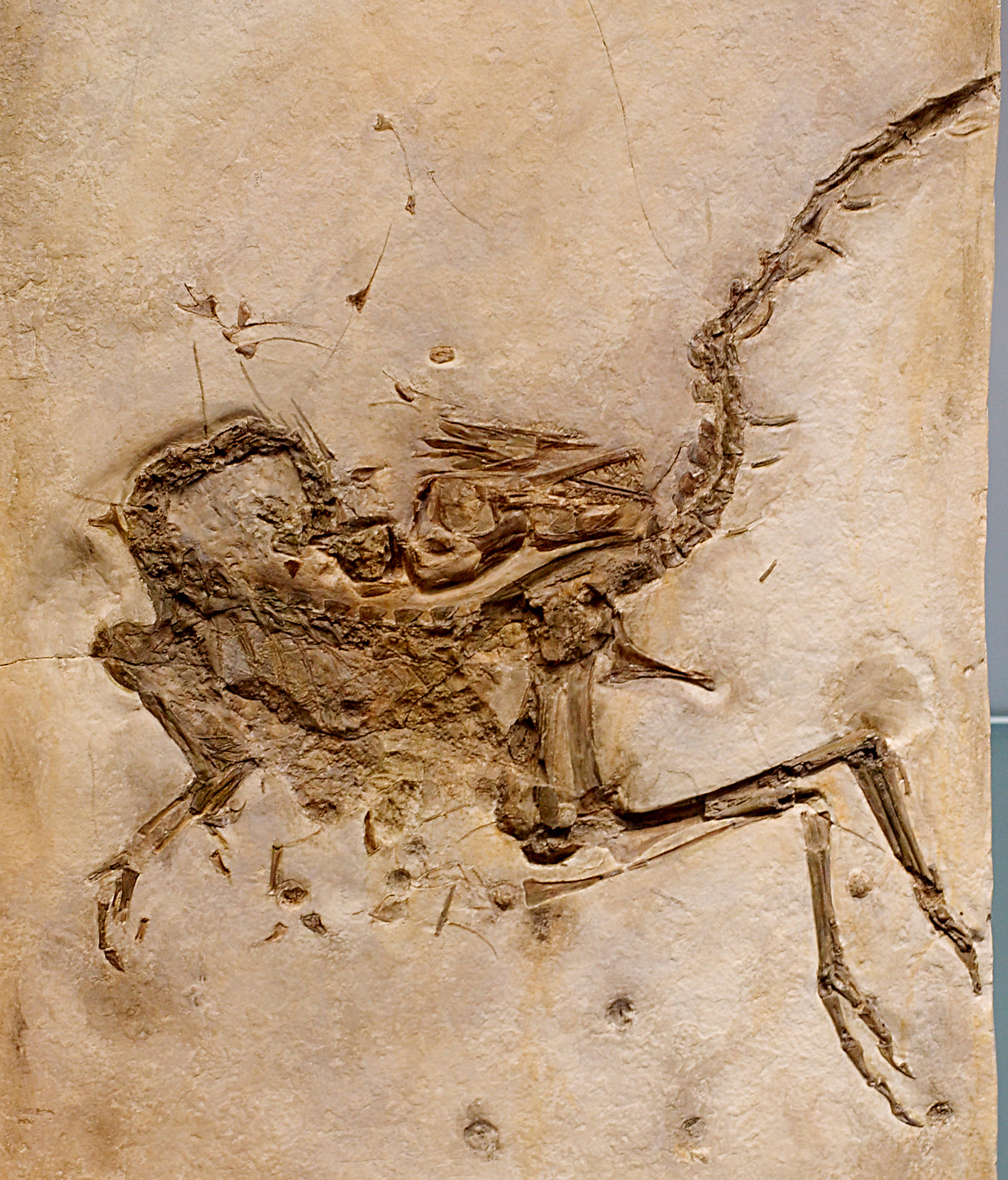
Joseph Oberndorfer acquired this fossil in Bavaria, Germany, in 1859. Shown here is a cast at the Bavarian State Institute for Paleontology and Historical Geology.

Compsognathus is known from two almost complete skeletons. The German specimen (specimen number BSP AS I 563) stems from limestone deposits in Bavaria and was part of the collection of physician and fossil collector Joseph Oberndorfer. Oberndorfer lent the specimen to paleontologist Johann A. Wagner, who published a brief discussion in 1859, where he coined the name Compsognathus longipes. Wagner did not recognise Compsognathus as a dinosaur, but instead described it as one of the "most curious forms among the lizards". He published a more detailed description in 1861. In 1866, Oberndorfer's collection, including the Compsognathus specimen, was acquired by the paleontological state collection in Munich.

The year of discovery and the exact locality of the German specimen are unknown, possibly because Oberndorfer did not reveal details of the discovery to prevent other collectors from exploiting the locality; later authors have suggested that the German specimen was probably discovered during the 1850s. Weathering of the slab on which the fossil is preserved indicates that it was collected from a pile of waste rock left behind by quarrying. The specimen either stems from Jachenhausen or the region Riedenburg–Kehlheim. All possible localities are part of lagoonal deposits of the Painten Formation, and date to the latest part of the late Kimmeridgian or the earlier part of the early Tithonian. In the Jurassic, the region was part of the Solnhofen archipelago. The limestone of the area, the Solnhofen limestone, had been quarried for centuries, and yielded such well-preserved fossils as Archaeopteryx with feather impressions and pterosaurs with imprints of their wing membranes.

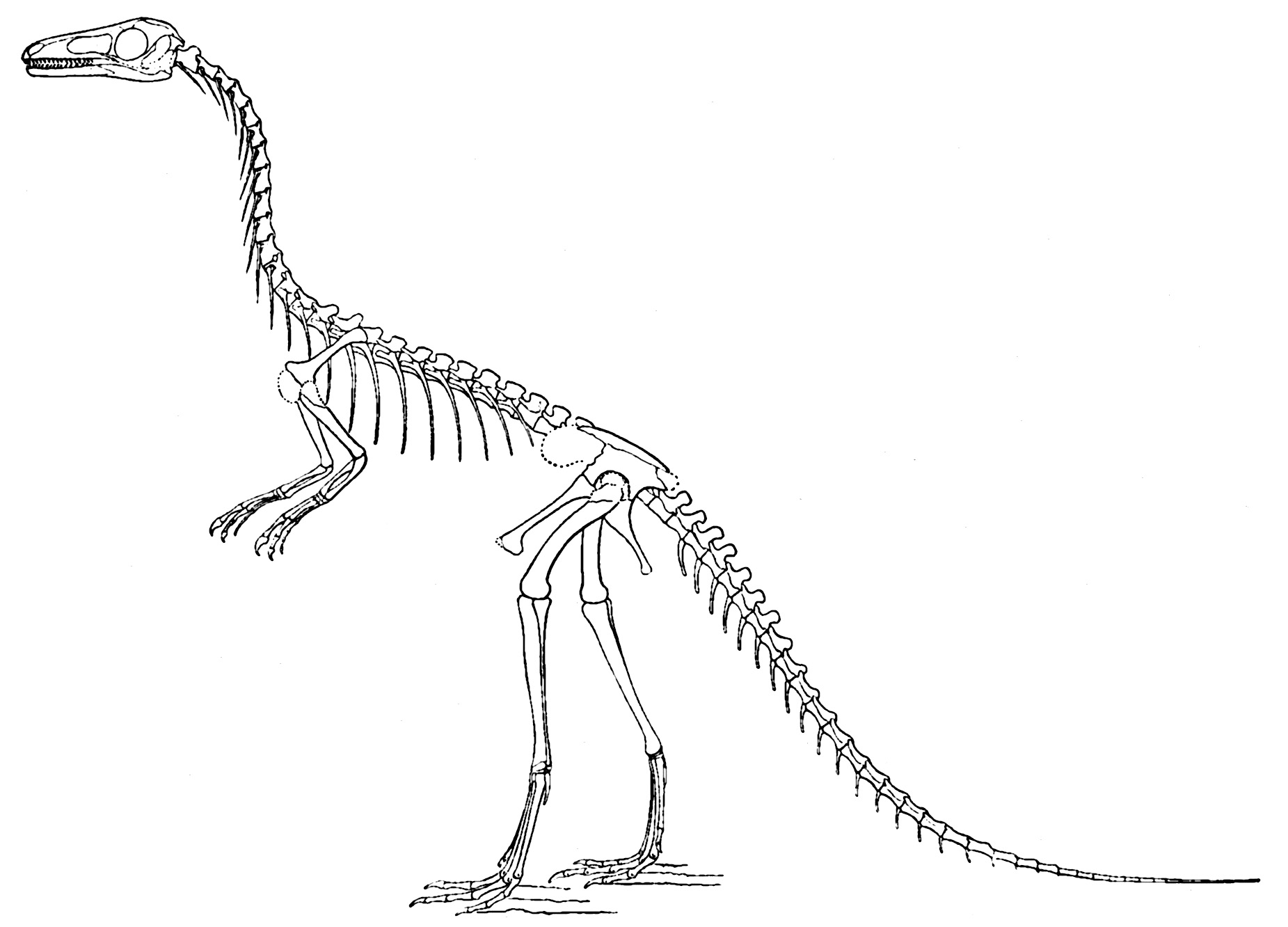
Skeletal reconstruction by Marsh, 1896

In two publications in 1868 and 1870, Thomas Huxley, a major proponent of Charles Darwin's theory of evolution, compared Compsognathus with Archaeopteryx, which was considered the earliest known bird. Following earlier suggestions by Carl Gegenbaur and Edward Drinker Cope, Huxley found that Archaeopteryx was closely similar to Compsognathus, and referred to the latter as a "bird-like reptile". He concluded that birds must have evolved from dinosaurs, an assessment that established Compsognathus as one of the most widely known dinosaurs. The specimen has since been studied by many prominent paleontologists, including Othniel Charles Marsh, who visited Munich in 1881. The German paleontologist J.G. Baur, who worked as an assistant of Marsh, removed the right ankle from the slab for illustration and study; this removed part got lost since. Although Baur published a detailed study of the ankle in 1882, which is now the only available source of information of this part of the skeleton, his reconstruction was later found to be inconsistent with corresponding impressions on the slab. John Ostrom thoroughly described the German specimen as well as the newly discovered French specimen in 1978, making Compsognathus one of the best-known small theropods at that time. He also concluded that the German specimen likely belongs to an immature individual.

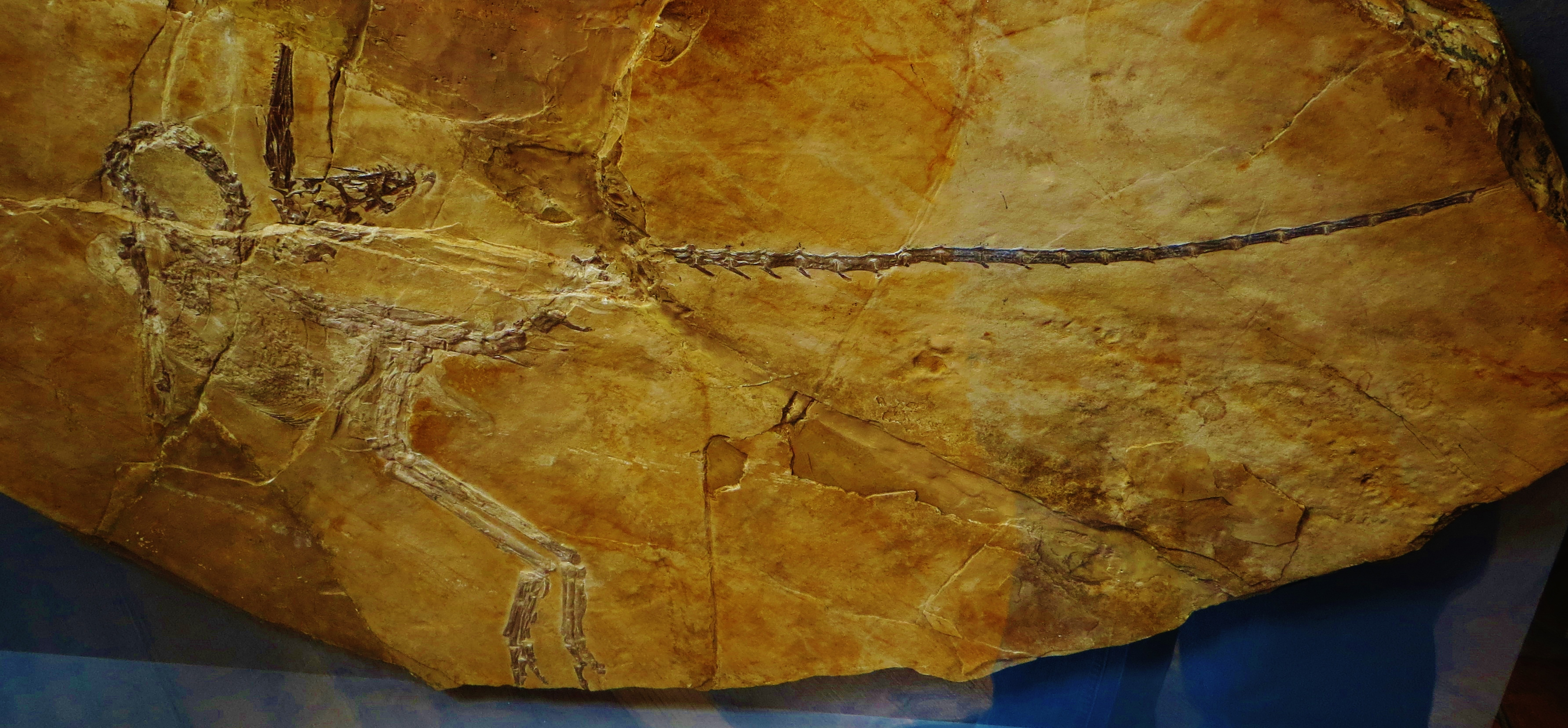
The fossil from Canjuers, France

The larger French specimen (Y85R M4M) was discovered in around 1971 in the Portlandian lithographic limestone of Canjuers near Nice. It dates to the lower Tithonian, as indicated by index fossils of ammonites. As Solnhofen, Canjures was famous for its limestone plates, which were quarried and sold under the name "dalles de Provence". The specimen was originally part of a large private fossil collection of Louis Ghirardi, the owner of the Canjures quarries. The collection, including the Compsognathus specimen, was sold to the National Museum of Natural History in Paris in 1983. Alain Bidar and Gérard Thomel, in a brief 1972 description, announced the new find under a separate species, Compsognathus corallestris. A more comprehensive description followed in the same year. According to these authors, the new species differed from the German species in its larger size and modified, flipper-like hand. Ostrom, Jean-Guy Michard and others have since relabeled it as another example of Compsognathus longipes. In 1984, George Callison and Helen Quimby identified the smaller German specimen as a juvenile of the same species.

Collector Heinrich Fischer had originally labeled a partial foot consisting of three metatarsals and a phalanx, from the Solnhofen area, as belonging to Compsognathus longipes. This identification was rejected by Wilhelm Dames, when he described the specimen for the first time in 1884. Friedrich von Huene, in 1925 and 1932, also found that the foot did probably not belong to Compsognathus itself but to a closely related genus. Ostrom, in his 1978 monography, questioned the attribution of this fossil to Compsognathus once more. Jens Zinke, in 1998, assigned forty-nine isolated teeth from the Guimarota coal mine of Portugal to the genus. Zinke found that these teeth are not identical to those of Compsognathus longipes, having serrations on the front edge, and thus labeled the teeth as Compsognathus sp. (of unknown species).

== Description ==
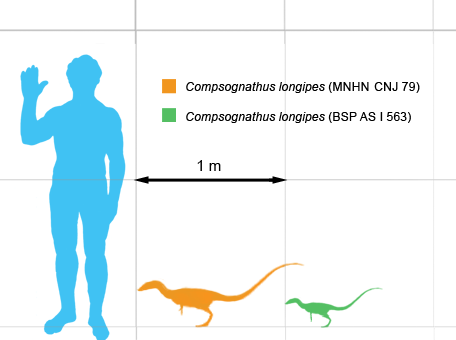
Size comparison of the French (orange) and German (green) specimens, with a human

For decades, Compsognathus was known as the smallest known non-avian dinosaur, although some dinosaurs discovered later, such as Mahakala and Microraptor, were even smaller. The German specimen was estimated to be 70–75 cm (28–30 in) and 89 cm (35 in) in length by separate authors, while the larger French specimen was estimated at 1.25 m (4 ft 1 in) and 1.4 m (4 ft 7 in) in length. The height at the hip has been estimated at 20 cm (7.9 in) for the German specimen and at 29 cm (11 in) for the French specimen. The German specimen was estimated to have weighed 0.32 kg (0.71 lb) and 0.58 kg (1.3 lb), and the French specimen 2.5 kg (5.5 lb) and 3.5 kg (7.7 lb). Compared to other compsognathids, the larger French specimen would have been similar in size to larger Sinosauropteryx specimens, but smaller than Huaxiagnathus and Mirischia.

Compsognathus were small, bipedal animals with long legs and longer tails, which they used for balance during locomotion. The forelimbs were smaller than the hindlimbs. The hand bore two large, clawed digits and a third, smaller digit that may have been non-functional. Their delicate skulls were narrow and long, with tapered snouts. The skull had five pairs of fenestrae (skull openings), the largest of which was for the orbit (eye socket), with the eyes being larger in proportion to the rest of the skull. The lower jaw was slender and had no mandibular fenestra, a hole in the side of the lower jawbone commonly seen in archosaurs.

Reconstructed skeleton, Academy of Natural Sciences of Drexel University

The teeth were small and pointed, suited for its diet of small vertebrates and possibly other small animals, such as insects. The German specimen had three teeth in each premaxilla (front bone of the lower jaw), 15 or 16 teeth in each maxilla, and 18 teeth in the lower jaw. The French specimen had more teeth, including four in each premaxilla, 17 or 18 in the maxilla, and at least 21 teeth in the dentary. Compsognathids were unique among theropods in having tooth crowns that curved backwards at two thirds of their height, while their mid-parts were straight; also, the crowns had expanded bases. In Compsognathus, the frontmost teeth of the upper and lower jaws were unserrated, while those further back had fine serrations on their rear edges. In the German specimen, the crowns were around two times higher than wide in the front of the jaws but diminished in height further back, with the last tooth about as high as wide. The German specimen also shows a diastema (tooth gap) behind the first three teeth of the premaxilla. As such a gap was not present in the French specimen, Peyer suggested that additional teeth were possibly present in this region the German specimen.

The number of digits on the hand of Compsognathus has been a source of debate. For much of its history, Compsognathus was typically depicted with three digits, as is typical for theropods. However, the type specimen only preserved phalanges from the first two digits, leading to the suggestion that Compsognathus had only two functional digits, with the third metacarpal being smaller and thinner. Study of the French specimen indicated that the third digit bore at least one or two small phalanges. However, there remains no evidence for an ungual phalanx on the third digit, so the digit may have been reduced and non-functional.

=== Integument ===
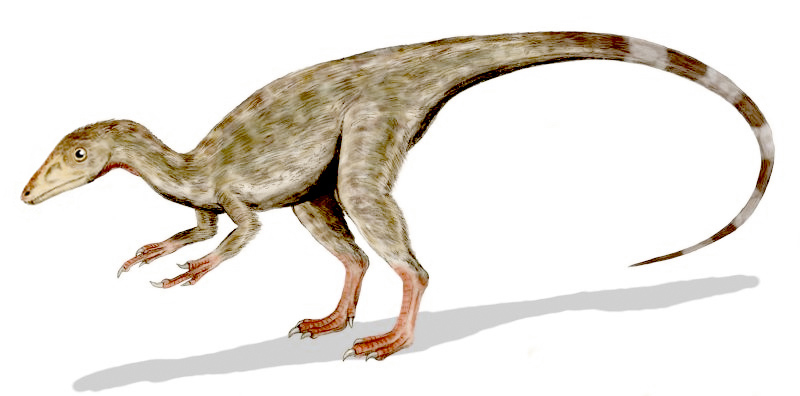
Evidence from related species suggests that the body might have been covered with feather-like structures.

Some relatives of Compsognathus, namely Sinosauropteryx and Sinocalliopteryx, have been preserved with the remains of simple feathers covering the body like fur, prompting some scientists to suggest that Compsognathus might have been feathered in a similar way. Consequently, many depictions of Compsognathus show them with coverings of downy proto-feathers. However, no feathers or feather-like covering have been preserved with Compsognathus fossils, in contrast to Archaeopteryx, which are found in the same sediments. Karin Peyer, in 2006, reported skin impressions preserved on the side of the tail starting at the 13th tail vertebra. The impressions showed small bumpy tubercles, similar to the scales found on the tail and hind legs of Juravenator. A 2022 review of non-feather integument of non-avialan theropods interprets these structures as aberrant bony growths rather than scales, as the structures are "texturally and mineralogically indistinguishable" from the rest of the fossilized vertebrae. Additional scales had in 1901 been reported by Von Huene, in the abdominal region of the German Compsognathus, but Ostrom subsequently disproved this interpretation; in 2012, Achim Reisdorf postulated that they are plaques of adipocere, corpse wax.

A patch of fossilized skin from the tail and hindlimb of the possible relative Juravenator starki shows mainly scales, though there is some indication that simple feathers were also present in the preserved areas. This may mean that a feather covering was not ubiquitous in this group of dinosaurs, or maybe that some species had fewer feathers than others.

== Classification ==
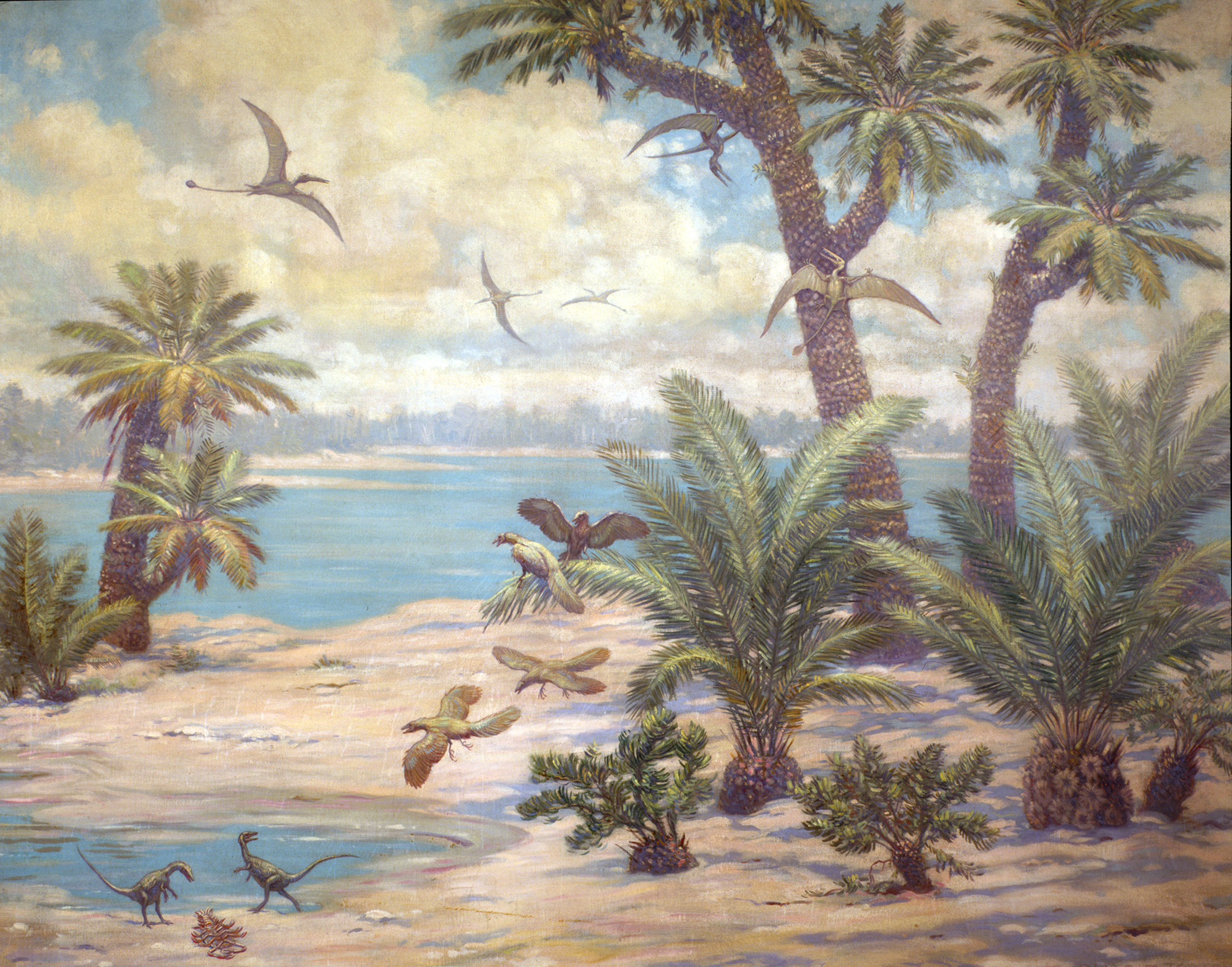
Outdated restoration of Compsognathus and Archaeopteryx by Charles R. Knight

Originally classified as a lizard, the dinosaurian affinities of Compsognathus were first noted by Gegenbaur, Cope, and Huxley between 1863 and 1868. Cope, in 1870, classified Compsognathus within a new clade of dinosaurs, the Symphypoda, which also contained Ornithotarsus (today classified as Hadrosaurus). Later, both genera were found to belong to other groups of Cope's classification of dinosaurs: Compsognathus to the Gonipoda (equivalent to Theropoda, in which it is now classified), and Ornithotarsus to the Orthopoda (equivalent to Ornithischia). Huxley, in 1870, rejected Cope's dinosaur classification scheme, and instead proposed the new clade Ornithoscelida, in which he included the Dinosauria (comprising several forms now considered as ornithischians) and another new clade, the Compsognatha, which contained Compsognathus as the only member. Later, these groups fell into disuse, although a resurrection of the Ornithoscelida was proposed in 2017. The group Compsognatha was used for the last time by Marsh in a 1896 publication, where it was treated as a suborder of Theropoda. In the same publication, Marsh erected the new family Compsognathidae. Friedrich von Huene, in 1914, erected the new infraorder Coelurosauria, which includes the Compsognathidae amongst other families of small theropods; this classification remained in use since.

The Compsognathidae are a group of mostly small dinosaurs from the late Jurassic and early Cretaceous periods of China, Europe and South America. For many years, Compsognathus was the only member known, but in recent decades paleontologists have discovered several related genera. The clade includes Aristosuchus, Huaxiagnathus, Mirischia, Sinosauropteryx, and perhaps Juravenator and Scipionyx. At one time, Mononykus was proposed as a member of the family, but this was rejected by Chen and coauthors in a 1998 paper; they considered the similarities between Mononykus and the compsognathids to be an example of convergent evolution. The position of Compsognathus and its relatives within the coelurosaur group is uncertain. Some, such as theropod expert Thomas Holtz Jr. and co-authors Ralph Molnar and Phil Currie in the landmark 2004 text Dinosauria, hold the family as the most basal of the coelurosaurs, while others as part of the Maniraptora.

For almost a century, Compsognathus longipes was the only well-known small theropod species. This led to comparisons with Archaeopteryx and to suggestions of an especially close relationship with birds. In fact, Compsognathus, rather than Archaeopteryx, piqued Huxley's interest in the origin of birds. The two animals share similarities in shape and proportions, so many in fact that two specimens of Archaeopteryx, the "Eichstätt" and the "Solnhofen", were for a time misidentified as those of Compsognathus. Many other types of theropod dinosaurs, such as maniraptorans, are now known to have been more closely related to birds.

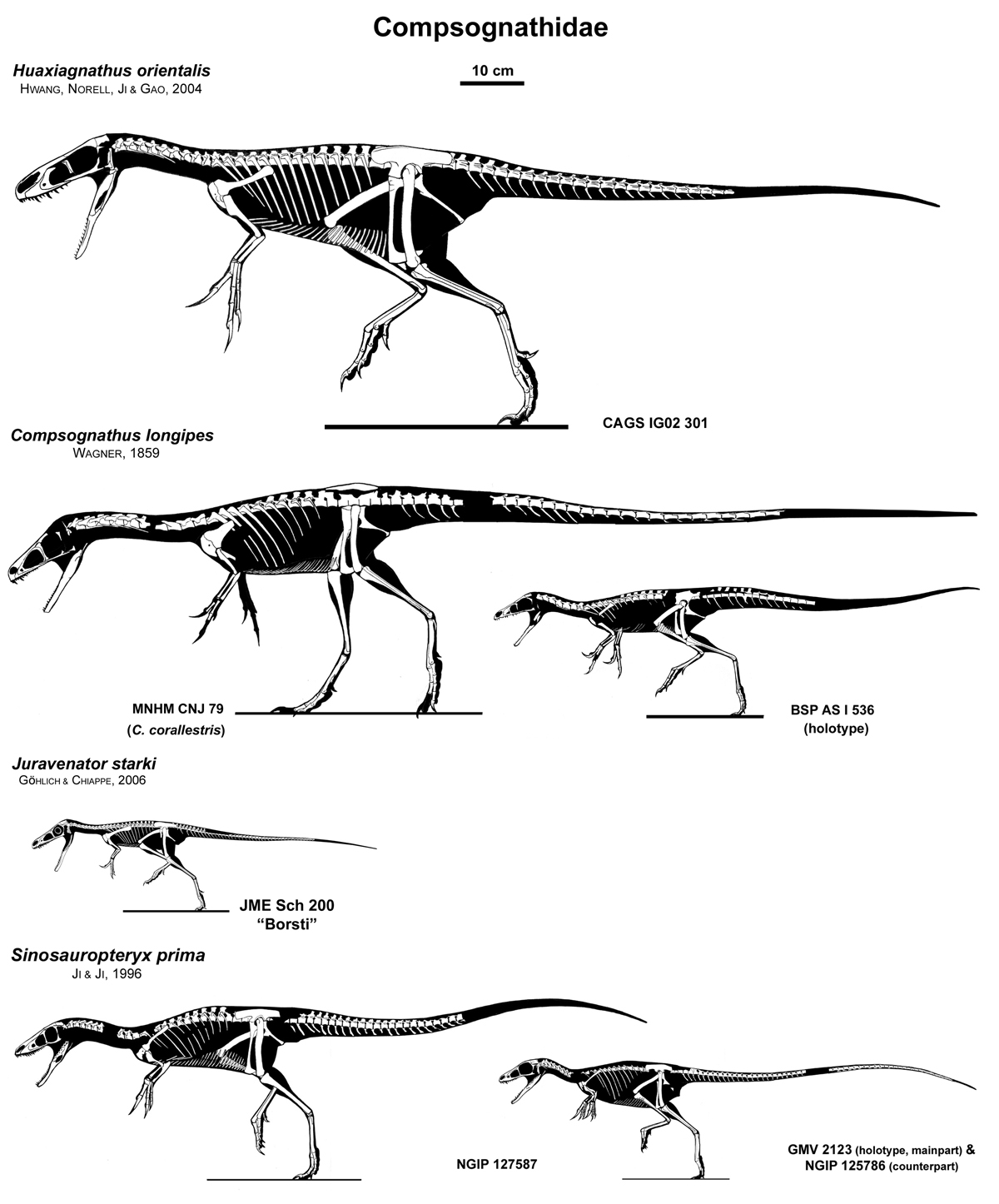
Diagrams showing known elements of the two specimens (middle) and other compsognathids

Below is a simplified cladogram placing Compsognathus in Compsognathidae by Senter et al. in 2012.

- Compsognathidae
  - - Sinocalliopteryx
    - Huaxiagnathus
  - - Sinosauropteryx
    - - **Compsognathus**
      - - Juravenator
        - Scipionyx

Here is an alternative phylogeny, published by Cau in 2024, with both specimens in bold.

- Tetanurae
  - - Siamraptor
    - Siamotyrannus
  - Orionides
    - - Streptospondylus
      - Xuanhanosaurus
      - Poekilopleuron
      - Piveteausaurus
      - Piatnitzkysaurus
      - Marshosaurus
      - Leshansaurus
      - Eustreptospondylus
      - Condorraptor
      - Asfaltovenator
      - - Sciurumimus
        - Nedcolbertia
        - Magnosaurus
        - Duriavenator
        - Afrovenator
        - - **Compsognathus longipes**
          - **Compsognathus corallestris**
          - Torvosaurus tanneri
          - Torvosaurus gurneyi
          - Megalosaurus
          - - Scipionyx
            - Wiehenvenator
            - Iberospinus
            - - Baryonychinae
              - Spinosaurinae
    - Avetheropoda
      - Allosauroidea (Incl. Juravenator at an indeterminate position)
      - Coelurosauria
        - Sinosauropteryx
        - Sinocalliopteryx
        - Mirischia
        - Huaxiagnathus
        - Zuolong
        - Tyrannoraptora
          - Maniraptoromorpha
          - - NGMC 2124
            - Tanycolagreus
            - Stokesosaurus
            - Juratyrant
            - Eutyrannosauria

== Paleobiology ==
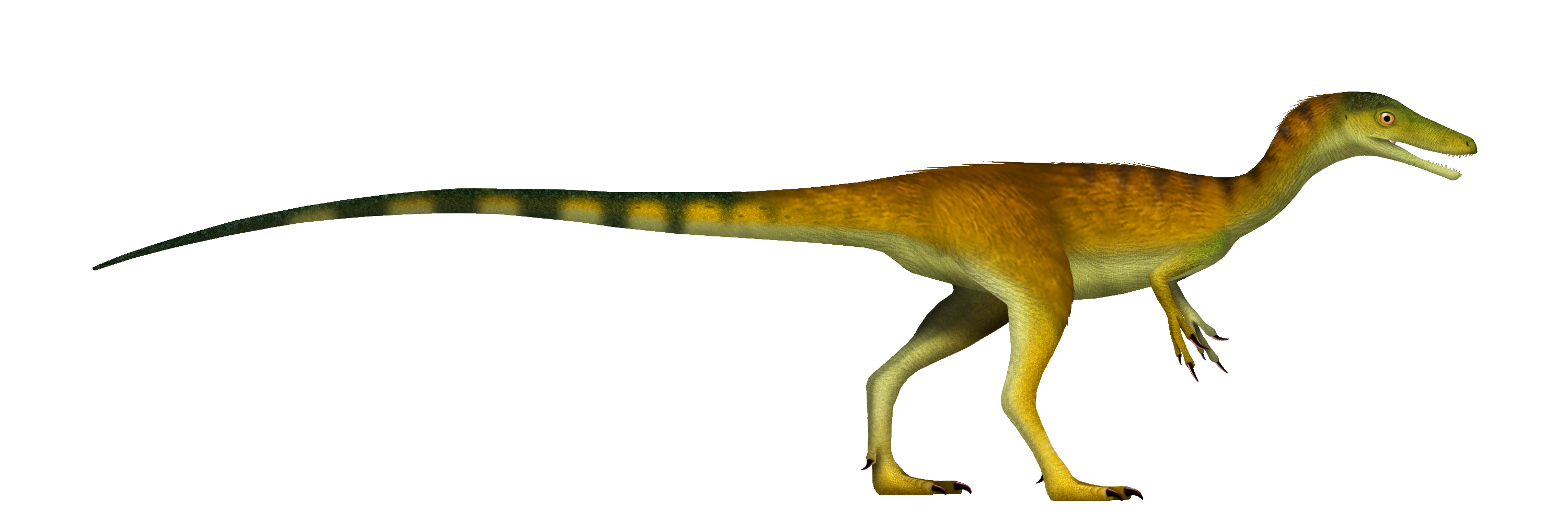
Life restoration

In a 2001 study conducted by Bruce Rothschild and other paleontologists, nine foot bones referred to Compsognathus were examined for signs of stress fracture, but none were found.

=== Habitat ===
Bidar and colleagues, in their 1972 description of the French specimen, argued that this specimen had webbed hands which would look like flippers in life. This interpretation was based on a supposed impression of the flipper that consists of several undulating wrinkles running parallel to the forelimb on the surface of the slab. In a 1975 popular book, L. Beverly Halstead depicts the animal as an amphibious dinosaur capable of feeding on aquatic prey and swimming out of reach of larger predators. Ostrom debunked this hypothesis, noting that the forelimb of the French specimen is poorly preserved, and that the wrinkles extend well beyond the skeleton and thus are likely sedimentary structures unrelated to the fossil.

=== Diet ===
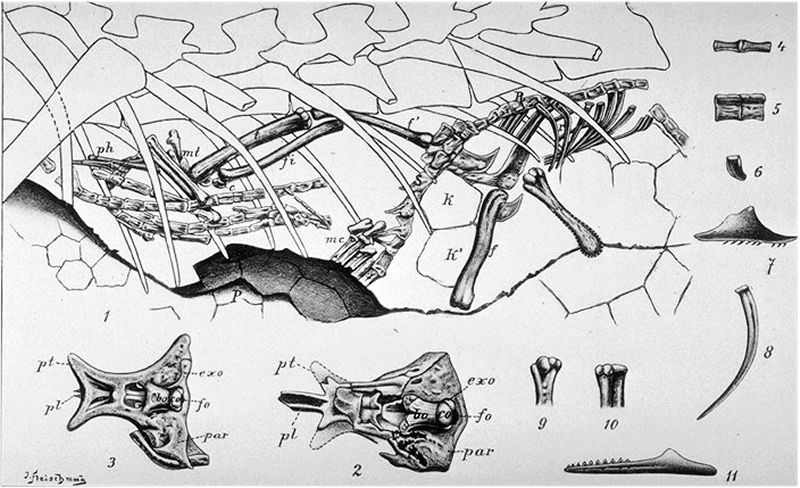
This 1903 illustration by Franz Nopcsa von Felső-Szilvás shows the gastric content of the German specimen

The remains of a lizard in the German specimen's thoracic cavity show that Compsognathus preyed on small vertebrates. Marsh, who examined the specimen in 1881, thought that this small skeleton in the Compsognathus belly was an embryo, but in 1903, Franz Nopcsa concluded that it was a lizard. Ostrom identified the remains as belonging to a lizard of the genus Bavarisaurus, which he concluded was a fast and agile runner owing to its long tail and limb proportions. This in turn led to the conclusion that its predators, Compsognathus, must have had sharp vision and the ability to rapidly accelerate and outrun the lizard. Conrad made the lizard found in the thoracic cavity of the German specimen of Compsognathus the holotype of a new species Schoenesmahl dyspepsia. The lizard is in several pieces, indicating that the Compsognathus must have dismembered it while restraining it with its hands and teeth, and then swallowed the remains whole; a similar strategy is used by modern predatory birds. The French specimen's gastric contents consist of unidentified lizards or sphenodontids.

=== Possible eggs ===
The plate of the German Compsognathus shows several circular irregularities 10 mm (0.39 in) in diameter near the skeletal remains. Peter Griffiths interpreted them as immature eggs in 1993. However, later researchers have doubted their connection to the genus because they were found outside the body cavity of the animal. A well-preserved fossil of a Sinosauropteryx, a genus related to Compsognathus, shows two oviducts bearing two unlaid eggs. These proportionally larger and less numerous eggs of Sinosauropteryx cast further doubt on the original identification of the purported Compsognathus eggs. In 1964 German geologist Karl Werner Barthel had explained the discs as gas bubbles formed in the sediment because of the putrefaction of the carcass.

=== Speed ===
In 2007, William Sellers and Phillip Manning estimated a maximum speed of 17.8 m/s (40 mph) based on a computer model of the skeleton and muscles. This estimate has been criticized by other scholars.

== Paleoenvironment ==
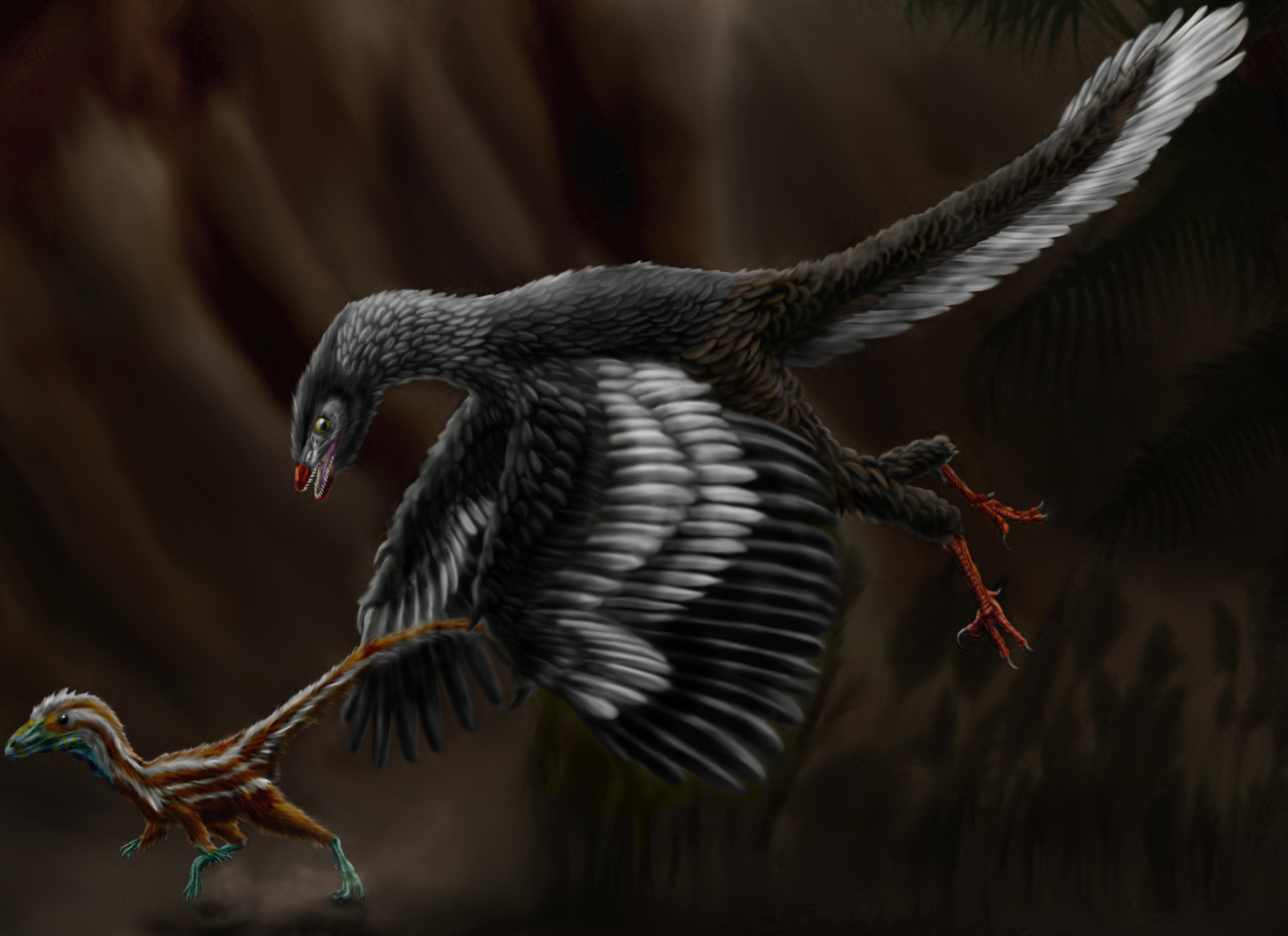
Restoration of an Archaeopteryx chasing a juvenile Compsognathus

During the late Jurassic, Europe was a dry, tropical archipelago at the edge of the Tethys Sea. The fine limestone in which the skeletons of Compsognathus have been found originated in calcite from the shells of marine organisms. Both the German and French areas where Compsognathus specimens have been preserved were lagoons situated between the beaches and coral reefs of the Jurassic European islands in the Tethys Sea. Contemporaries of Compsognathus longipes include the early avialan Archaeopteryx lithographica and the pterosaurs Rhamphorhynchus muensteri and Pterodactylus antiquus. The same sediments in which Compsognathus have been preserved also contain fossils of a number of marine animals such as fish, crustaceans, echinoderms and marine mollusks, confirming the coastal habitat of this theropod. No other dinosaur has been found in association with Compsognathus, indicating that these little dinosaurs might in fact have been the top land predator in these islands.

=== Taphonomy ===
Much discussion revolved around the taphonomy of the German specimen, i.e. how the individual died and became fossilized. Reisdorf and Wuttke, in 2012, speculated about the events that lead to the death and transportation of the specimen to its place of burial. First, the individual must have been brought into the lagoon from its habitat, which probably was on the surrounding islands. It is possible that a flash flood swept the animal into the sea, in which case it likely died by drowning. It is also possible that the animal swam or drifted onto the sea, or that it rafted on plants, and was then transported by surface currents to its place of burial. In any case, the specimen would have arrived on the sea floor within a few hours after its death, as otherwise gases forming in its body cavity would have prevented it from sinking in one piece. Water depth at the burial site would have been large enough to prevent refloating of the carcass after such gases were produced. Rounded structures on the slab might have been formed by the release of these gases.

Taphonomic reconstructions are complicated as the exact locality and the position and orientation of the fossil within the sediments is no longer known. As a compression fossil, the specimen would originally have been preserved on both the upper surface of a layer and the lower surface of the subsequent layer (i.e., on a slab and its counter-slab); the counter-slab is now lost. Reisdorf and Wuttke, in 2012, argued that the front and hind limbs of the left side of the body were better articulated (still connected together) than those of the right side. This suggests that the specimen is located on the bottom side of the upper slab, and was lying on its left side. The German specimen was preserved with a high degree of articulation—only the skull, hands, cervical ribs and gastralia show disarticulation. The braincase was displaced behind the skull, the first tail vertebra was rotated by 90°, and the tail shows a break between the seventh and eighth tail vertebra.

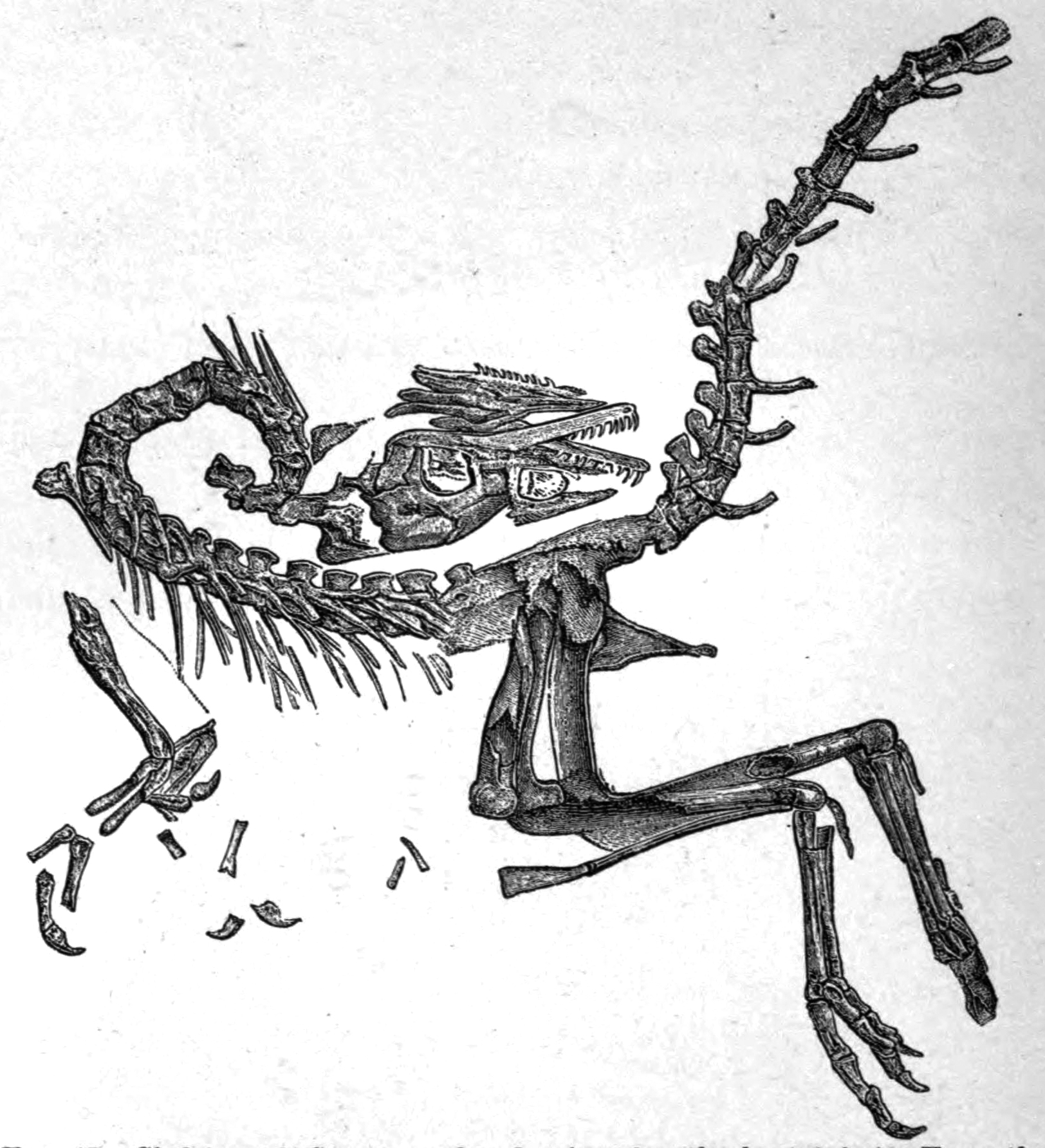
Illustration of the German specimen

In both Compsognathus specimens, the neck is strongly curved, with the head coming to rest above the pelvis; the spine of the tail was likewise curved. This posture, known as the death pose, is found in many vertebrate fossils, and the German Compsognathus specimen was central in several studies that sought to explain this phenomenon. The physician Moodie, in 1918, suggested that the death pose in Compsognathus and similar fossils was the result of an opisthotonus—death throes causing spastic stiffening of the back musculature—while the animal was dying. This hypothesis was soon challenged by paleontologist Friedrich von Huene, who argued that the death pose was the result of desiccation and therefore occurred only after the death. Peter Wellnhofer, in 1991, argued that death poses resulted from the elastic pull of the ligaments, which are released after death. The veterinarian Cynthia Faux and the paleontologist Kevin Padian, in a 2007 study that gained much attention, supported the original opisthotonus hypothesis of Moodie. These authors furthermore argued that upon death, muscles are relaxed and body parts can be easily moved relative to each other. Since opisthotonic postures are already established during death, they may only be preserved if the animal dies in place and becomes buried rapidly. This contradicts previous interpretations on the environment and taphonomy of Compsognathus and other fossils from the Solnhofen limestones, which assumed very slow burial at the bottom of lagoons into which the carcasses were transported from nearby islands. Reisdorf and Wuttke concluded that the death posture indeed resulted from the release of ligaments, more specifically the ligamentum elasticum interlaminare, which spans the spine from the neck to tail in modern birds. The release of this ligament would have occurred gradually while the surrounding muscle tissue decayed, and only after the carcass was transported to its final site of deposition.

The bottom water of the lagoon was likely anaerobic (devoid in oxygen), resulting in a sea floor devoid of life except for microbial mats, and therefore preventing scavenging of the carcass. In the trunk region of the German specimen, the surface of the slab is markedly different in texture to the surrounding areas of the slab, showing irregular, nodular surfaces within depressions. Ostrom, in 1978, interpreted these structures as traces of weathering that took place just before the fossil was collected. Nopcsa, in 1903, instead suggested that these structures resulted from decomposing tissue of the carcass. Reisdorf and Wuttke, in their 2012 study, suggested that the structures are the remains of adipocere (corpse wax formed by bacteria) that formed around the carcass before burial. Such adipocere would have helped in conserving the state of articulation of the fossil for years when burial was very slow. The presence of adipocere would possibly rule out hypersalinity (very high salt contents) of the bottom water, because such conditions appear to be unfavorable for the adipocere producing bacteria.

== In popular culture ==
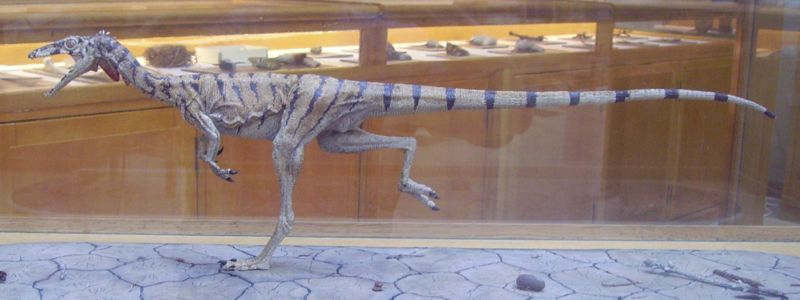
Compsognathus was previously depicted without feathers, as here in Oxford University Museum of Natural History

Compsognathus is one of the more popular dinosaurs. For a long time, it was considered unique in its small size, which is commonly compared to that of a chicken. The animals have appeared in the Jurassic Park franchise: in the films The Lost World: Jurassic Park, Jurassic Park III, Jurassic World: Fallen Kingdom, Jurassic World Dominion and Jurassic World Rebirth, and the television series Camp Cretaceous and Chaos Theory. In The Lost World: Jurassic Park, the species is incorrectly identified as Compsognathus triassicus, combining the genus name of Compsognathus longipes with the specific name of Procompsognathus triassicus, a distantly related small carnivore that also appears in the Jurassic Park series.
