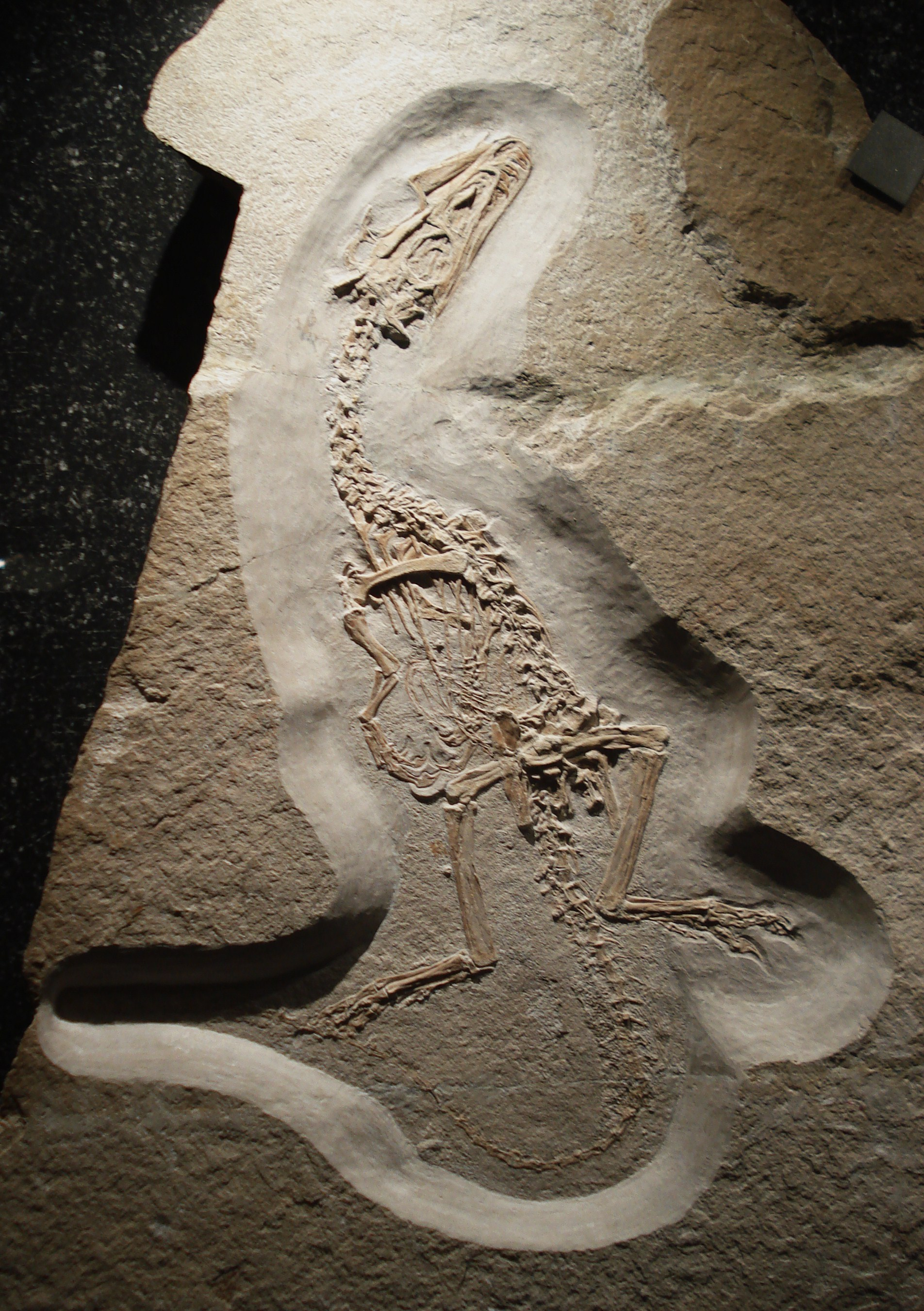
- Holotype specimen

Scientific classification
- Kingdom: Animalia
- Phylum: Chordata
- Class: Reptilia
- Clade: Dinosauria
- Clade: Saurischia
- Clade: Theropoda
- Clade: Orionides
- Genus: †Juravenator; Göhlich & Chiappe, 2006

Type species
- †Juravenator starki Göhlich & Chiappe, 2006

= Juravenator =

Juravenator Temporal range: Late Jurassic, 151.5 Ma

Extinct genus of dinosaurs

Juravenator is a genus of tetanuran theropod dinosaur which lived about 152 or 151 million years ago in modern day Franconian Jura of Germany (Torleite Formation) during the Late Jurassic. It is known from a single, juvenile specimen measuring about 75 cm (2.46 ft) in length.

== Description ==
Size of the juvenile type specimen, with a human for scale

Juravenator was a small bipedal predator. The holotype of Juravenator represents a juvenile individual, about seventy-five centimetres in length. In 2006 and 2010 Göhlich established some diagnostic traits. The four teeth of the premaxilla in the front of the snout had serrations on the upper third of the back edge of the tooth crown. Between the tooth row of the premaxilla and that of the maxilla there was no hiatus. The maxillary teeth were few in number, eight with the holotype. The depression or fossa for the large skull opening, the fenestra antorbitalis, was long and extended far to the front. The humerus was relatively short. The claws of the hand were high at their bases and suddenly narrowed transversely in the middle. The zygapophyses in the middle of the tail were bow-shaped.

=== Feathers and scales ===
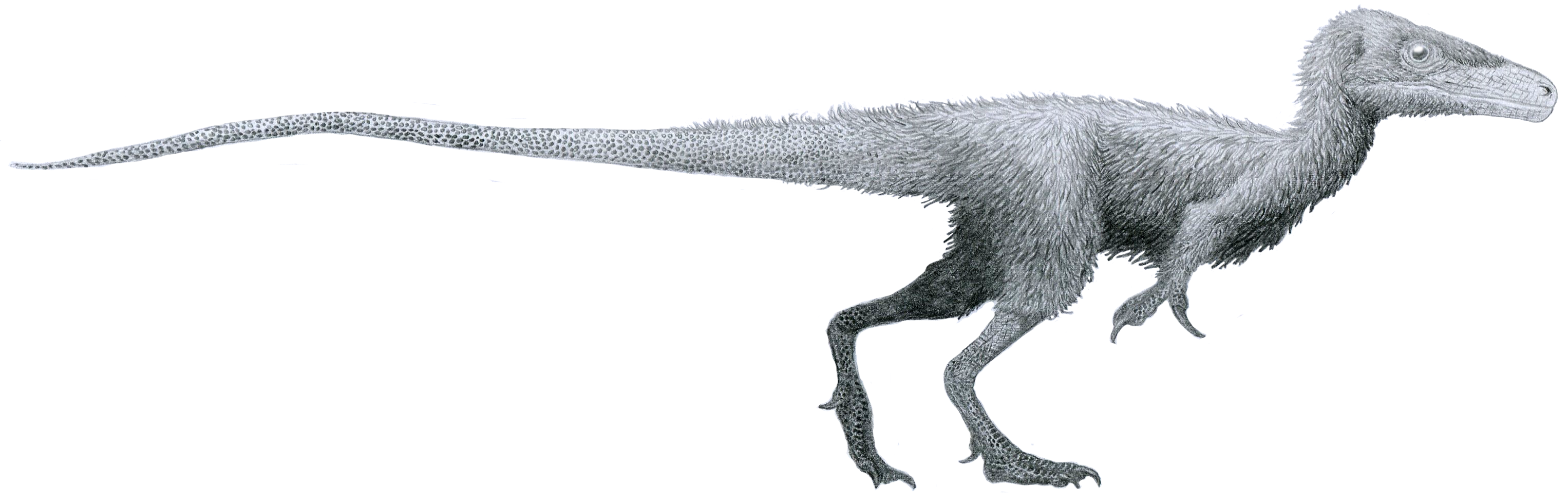
Life reconstruction based on the juvenile holotype, showing both feathers and scales.

Juravenator was originally classified as a member of the Compsognathidae, making it a close relative of Compsognathus, which preserved evidence of scales on the tail of one specimen, but also of Sinosauropteryx and Sinocalliopteryx, for which there is fossil evidence of a downy, feather-like covering. However, a patch of fossilized Juravenator skin (from the tail, between the eighth and twenty-second vertebra, and lower hind leg) shows primarily normal dinosaur scales, as well as traces of what may be simple feathers. Paleontologist Xu Xing, in his comments on the find in the journal Nature, initially suggested that the presence of scales on the tail of Juravenator could mean that the feather coat of early feathered dinosaurs was more variable than seen in modern birds. Xu also questioned the interpretation of Juravenator as a compsognathid, suggesting the extensive scaly hide could be a primitive trait. Xu considered it most likely that Juravenator and other primitive feathered dinosaurs simply possessed more extensive scales on their bodies than modern birds, which retain scales only on the feet and lower legs.

Xu's interpretation was supported by further study of the Juravenator fossil. The first follow-up study to the initial description reported that faint impressions of filamentous structures, possibly primitive feathers, were present along the top of the tail and hips. A more in-depth study, published in 2010, included an examination of the specimen under ultra-violet light by Helmut Tischlinger. The examination under UV revealed a more extensive covering of filament-like structures, similar in anatomy to the primitive feathers of other compsognathids, including Sinosauropteryx. The investigation also discovered additional patches of soft tissue, on the snout and the lower leg, and vertical collagen fibres between the chevrons of the tail vertebrae.

Foth et al. (2020) reinterpreted purported scales preserved with the holotype specimen of J. starki as remains of adipocere, possibly indicating the presence of a fat body. Christophe Hendrickx and Phil R. Bell reexamined the specimen of Juravenator and found that the scaly integument on the tail show the presence of integumentary sense organs.

== Discovery and naming ==
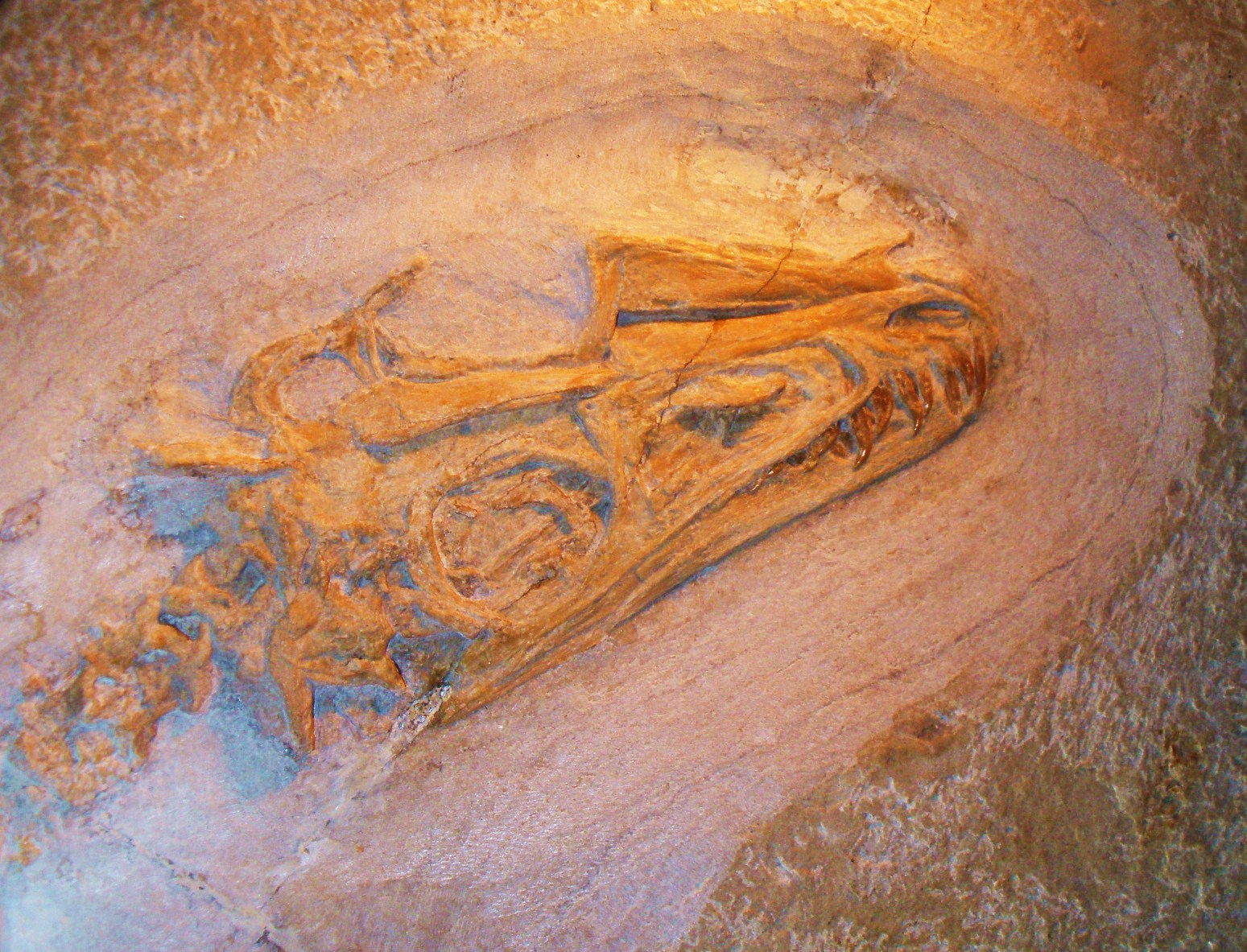
Close-up of the skull

In the summer of 1998, the Jura-Museum Eichstätt at Eichstätt organised a paleontological expedition to the nearby chalk quarry of Schamhaupten. Near the end of the planned excavations, two volunteers, Klaus-Dieter Weiß and his brother Hans-Joachim Weiß, found a chalk plate in which clear vertebrate remains were visible. A first preparation uncovered the head of a small theropod. However, due to the vulnerability of the bones, removing the hard calcium silicate matrix was slow and expensive. To see whether it was worthwhile to proceed, a CT-scan of the fossil was made. This seemed to show that only the neck and a small part of the rump were still present and accordingly the preparation was discontinued. In 1999 the find was reported in the scientific literature by Günther Viohl. By 2001 the fossil had generated some publicity and was nicknamed Borsti in the German press, a name commonly given to bristle-haired dogs, on the assumption the creature was endowed with bristly protofeathers. In 2003, the new director of the museum, Martina Kölbl-Ebert, decided to finish the preparation. Preparator Pino Völkl then discovered, during seven hundred hours uncovering the remaining bones, that almost the entire skeleton was present.

In 2006 the type species Juravenator starki was named and described by Ursula Göhlich and Luis Chiappe. The generic name is derived from the name of the Jura Mountains and the Latin venator, "hunter". The specific name honours the Stark family, owners of the quarry.

The holotype, JME Sch 200, was found in the Malm Epsilon 2, a marl layer of the Torleite Formation dating to the late Kimmeridgian, about 151 to 152 million years old. As the bones were accessed from below — the specimen having landed on its back on the seafloor — and the plate was not split further, a counterslab is lacking. The fossil consists of an almost complete articulated skeleton with skull of a juvenile individual. Only the tail end is missing. In small areas impressions or remains of the soft parts are present. The fossil was considered the most complete specimen of a non-avian theropod ever found in Europe.

== Classification ==
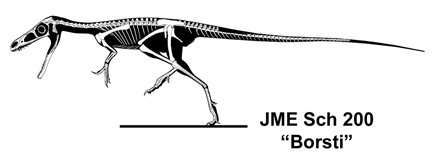
Skeletal reconstruction

While first classified as a member of the Compsognathidae, subsequent studies have found problems with the initial study that produced those findings. Rather than grouping it with Sinosauropteryx and other compsognathids, Butler et al. found that it was not a compsognathid, but rather a basal member of the group Maniraptora. Studies conflict on whether or not compsognathids belong to this later group or are more primitive. Additional work published by Luis Chiappe and Ursula Göhlich in 2010 found that Juravenator was most similar in anatomy to Compsognathus, and that it probably did belong to the Compsognathidae if that is actually a natural group. They also suggested that "compsognathids", including Juravenator, may form a grade of primitive coelurosaurs rather than a monophyletic clade. In 2011 Cristiano dal Sasso and Simone Maganuco published an analysis which recovered the Compsognathidae as a natural group and Juravenator belonging to it as a sister species of Sinosauropteryx. However, a large analysis of coelurosaurs published in 2013 again found Juravenator to be a coelurosaur closely related to, but not a member of, the Compsognathidae. Instead, it was recovered as a close relative of Ornitholestes outside the clade Maniraptoriformes. Foth et al. (2020) considered it plausible that Juravenator may have been a non-coelurosaurian tetanuran, potentially part of the megalosauroid group along with the similar Sciurumimus.

== Paleobiology ==
Comparisons between the scleral rings of Juravenator and modern birds and reptiles indicate that it may have been nocturnal. However, this may be due to the only known specimen being a juvenile.

A 2020 study by Bell & Hendrickx noted small, round structures preserved on the sides of the tail. They interpreted these as "integumentary sense organs" like those on the scales of crocodiles. If this identification is correct, these would be the first sensory organs found in the skin of any dinosaur. Juravenator may have used these to detect the movement of aquatic prey, such as fish, as it waded in the water.

== Taphonomy ==
Reisdorf and Wuttke, in 2012, provided an extensive discussion on the taphonomy of the Juravenator specimen, i.e. the events that lead to its death, transportation, and fossilization. The specimen was deposited within a lagoon, to where it must been transported, possibly from the nearby islands. It is possible that a flash flood swept the animal into the sea, in which case it likely died by drowning. It is also possible that the animal swam or drifted onto the sea, or that it rafted on plants, and was then transported by surface currents to its place of burial. The rafting hypothesis is supported by tree trunks found at the Schamhaupten locality. The specimen would have arrived on the sea floor within a few hours after its death, as otherwise gases forming in its body cavity would have prevented it from sinking in one piece. Water depth at the burial site would have been large enough to prevent refloating of the carcass after such gases were produced.

The specimen was found in almost in full articulation (bones still connected together), only the skull, pelvic girdle, and front section of the tail were disarticulated to some degree. The skeleton is nearly complete, and missing parts in the tail were likely lost during excavation. Some discussion have revolved around the original orientation of the fossil within the rock, that is if the slab was prepared from its top or bottom site, or whether the individual lay on its back or its belly. Chiappe and Göhlich, in their 2010 description, assumed that it lay on its belly, an interpretation that is further supported by an aptychus (body part of an ammonite) found within the slab; aptychi are almost always embedded with their concave sides pointing upwards. However, the original excavator later confirmed that the specimen is on the bottom site of the slab, and that it therefore lay on its back.

Reisdorf and Wuttke, in 2012, discovered small, rounded stones within the belly area that they interpreted as ooids. These ooids formed in shallow water and were likely transported with the individual to the place of burial. The authors speculate that Juravenator might have lived on the shores, where the ooids might have been swallowed. It is also possible that the individual drowned in shallow water, inhaling ooids suspended in the water. Chiappe and Göhlich identified fossils of isopods found with the specimen, and concluded that these animals likely have scavenged the carcass while it was still floating. Reisdorf and Wuttke, in 2012, stated that the isopods could alternatively have parasitising the living animal.

When the cadaver arrived at the seafloor, its head came to rest on its right side and the tail bent to the left. The seafloor was devoid of life except for a covering of microbial mats, preventing disruption by scavengers. In contrast to many other specimens from the Solnhofen archipelago, including Compsognathus, the Juravenator specimen was not found in a typical death pose with the neck and tail curved over the torso. Reisdorf and Wuttke concluded that death poses resulted from the release of elastic ligaments during decay that spanned the vertebral column. The Juravenator specimen does not show such a pose because it was lying on its back, preventing the spine from bending.
